= Brendan Kelly (bishop) =

Irish Roman Catholic prelate (born 1946)

The Most Reverend Brendan Kelly HDip
- Bishop Emeritus of Galway and Kilmacduagh; Apostolic Administrator Emeritus of Kilfenora
- Church: Roman Catholic
- Diocese: Galway, Kilmacduagh and Kilfenora
- Appointed: 11 December 2017
- Installed: 11 February 2018
- Term ended: 11 February 2022
- Predecessor: Martin Drennan
- Successor: Michael Duignan
- Previous posts: Bishop of Achonry; Vicar general of the Diocese of Galway, Kilmacduagh and Kilfenora; Vicar forane for the Kilfenora deanery Parish priest of Spiddal and Lisdoonvarna/Kilshanny; Chaplain to the L'Arche community Teacher at Our Lady's College, Gort and Coláiste Éinde

Orders
- Ordination: 20 June 1971 by Michael Browne
- Consecration: 27 January 2008 by Seán Brady

Personal details
- Born: 20 May 1946 (age 80) Derrybrien, County Galway, Ireland
- Parents: Seán and Annie Kelly
- Education: University College Galway; St Patrick's College, Maynooth
- Motto: De réir d’fhocail (According to your word)
- Coat of arms

Styles of Brendan Kelly
- Reference style: The Most Reverend
- Spoken style: Your Grace
- Religious style: Bishop

Brendan Kelly (born 20 May 1946) is an Irish former Roman Catholic prelate who served as Bishop of Galway and Kilmacduagh and Apostolic Administrator of Kilfenora between 2018 and 2022.

== Early life and education ==
Kelly was born in Derrybrien, County Galway on 20 May 1946, the second of nine children to Seán Kelly, a primary school teacher, and his wife Annie. He attended primary school at Craughwell National School and secondary school at St. Mary's College, before studying for the priesthood at St Patrick's College, Maynooth, completing a Bachelor of Arts in philosophy in 1967 and a Bachelor of Divinity in 1970.

Kelly was an ordained a priest for the Diocese of Galway and Kilmacduagh on 20 June 1971.

== Presbyteral ministry ==
Following ordination, Kelly's first pastoral appointment was as curate in Kinvara, before being appointed as teacher at Coláiste Éinde, Salthill in 1972. It was during this appointment that he completed a higher diploma in education from University College Galway in 1973. Kelly was subsequently appointed as teacher at Our Lady's College, Gort in 1980, and later the president of the college in 1986 until its amalgamation into Gort Community School in 1995.

He undertook a sabbatical year to serve as chaplain to the L'Arche community in Cuise-la-Motte, France, before returning to Ireland in 1996, when he was appointed as the parish priest in Lisdoonvarna/Kilshanny.

Kelly was named a canon of the cathedral chapter and vicar forane of the Kilfenora deanery on 19 June 2002. The following year, he was appointed as the parish priest in Spiddal. Kelly was appointed as the vicar general of the diocese by Martin Drennan in 2005, and a Chaplain of His Holiness by Pope Benedict XVI on 6 March 2006.

== Episcopal ministry ==
=== Bishop of Achonry ===
Kelly was appointed as Bishop-elect of Achonry by Pope Benedict XVI on 20 November 2007. He admitted his surprise and pleasure at his appointment, and promised to concentrate his initial efforts on becoming acquainted with the clergy and laity of the diocese, while the Archbishop of Armagh and Primate of All Ireland, Seán Brady, described him as "a man of prayer, filled with love for the Word of God and the pastoral care of people".

Kelly was consecrated by Cardinal Brady on 27 January 2008 in the Cathedral of the Annunciation of the Blessed Virgin Mary and St Nathy, Ballaghaderreen.

=== Bishop of Galway and Kilmacduagh ===
Kelly was subsequently appointed Bishop-elect of Galway and Kilmacduagh and Apostolic Administrator-elect of Kilfenora by Pope Francis on 11 December 2017. He was installed on 11 February 2018 in the Cathedral of Our Lady Assumed into Heaven and St Nicholas, Galway.

In accordance with canon law, Kelly submitted his episcopal resignation to the Dicastery for Bishops on his 75th birthday on 20 May 2021. Following the announcement by Pope Francis on 16 November 2021 that the Dioceses of Clonfert and Galway, Kilmacduagh and Kilfenora would be united in persona episcopi, the first-ever union of its kind in Ireland, (Note: Irish dioceses have been merged in the past–for example, Galway and Kilmacduagh in the 19th century–by leaving positions vacant and naming apostolic administrators rather than uniting two dioceses under a single ordinary.) he remained until the appointment of his successor, Michael Duignan, on 11 February 2022.

== Notes and references ==
=== References ===
Catholic Church titles
Preceded by Thomas Flynn	Bishop of Achonry; 2008–2018	Succeeded by Paul Dempsey
Preceded by Martin Drennan	Bishop of Galway and Kilmacduagh; 2018–2022	Succeeded by Michael Duignan
