= Sexual abuse scandal in the Roman Catholic Diocese of Galway, Kilmacduagh and Kilfenora =

Clergy in the Roman Catholic Diocese of Galway, Kilmacduagh and Kilfenora have been implicated in various sexual abuse scandals. The investigations into two bishops concerned allegations not connected with their service in the diocese. In both cases they were cleared with no case to answer. A report published in 2007 made adverse findings against a number of members of a religious order based in the diocese.

== Allegations against Bishop Casey ==
Eamon Casey was investigated in connection with 13 allegations of sexual abuse reported in November 2005 by a woman, a native of Limerick but living in the UK, concerning incidents that allegedly took place more than 30 years earlier. A Garda Síochána inquiry ensued. On 5 February 2006, Bishop Casey returned to Ireland and resided in Shanaglish, a village near Gort County Galway. In August 2006, the Director of Public Prosecutions decided that Casey had no case to answer.

== Allegations against Bishop Drennan ==
Bishop Martin Drennan was cited in the Murphy Report. The investigation found that he had handled sexual abuse allegations correctly while serving as an auxiliary bishop in the archdiocese of Dublin.

== McCoy Report ==
The McCoy Report into the Galway diocese began in 1999. The results were published in December 2007. It found that eleven brothers and seven other non clerical staff members were alleged to have abused 21 intellectually disabled children in residential care during the period 1965–1998. By 2007, two members of staff were convicted of abuse, eight had died and the rest had retired. It emerged that the Brothers of charity service Galway had attempted to transfer at least one accused brother to another place.
