= Michael Duignan (bishop) =

Irish Roman Catholic clergyman

The Most Reverend Michael Duignan
- Bishop of Clonfert and Galway and Kilmacduagh; Apostolic Administrator of Kilfenora
- Church: Roman Catholic
- Diocese: Clonfert and Galway, Kilmacduagh and Kilfenora
- Appointed: 16 July 2019 (Clonfert); 11 February 2022 (Galway, Kilmacduagh and Kilfenora)
- Installed: 13 October 2019 (Clonfert); 1 May 2022 (Galway, Kilmacduagh and Kilfenora)
- Predecessor: John Kirby (Clonfert); Brendan Kelly (Galway, Kilmacduagh and Kilfenora)
- Previous posts: Chancellor, Secretary, Episcopal Vicar for Education and Formation, and Financial Administrator of the Diocese of Elphin; National Director of and National Co-ordinator of Formation for the Permanent Diaconate for the Irish Catholic Bishops' Conference; Director of Religious Education, Theology and Chaplaincy at St Angela's College

Orders
- Ordination: 17 July 1994 by Dominic Conway
- Consecration: 13 October 2019 by John Kirby

Personal details
- Born: 15 July 1970 (age 56) Athlone, County Roscommon, Ireland
- Education: St. Patrick’s Society for the Foreign Missions; Pontifical Gregorian University
- Motto: Respicite ad eum, et illuminamini (Come ye to him and be enlightened)
- Coat of arms

Styles of Michael Duignan
- Reference style: The Most Reverend
- Spoken style: Your Grace
- Religious style: Bishop

Michael Gerard Duignan (born 15 July 1970) is an Irish Roman Catholic prelate who has served as Bishop of Clonfert since 2019 and additionally as Bishop of Galway and Kilmacduagh since 2022.

== Early life ==
Duignan was born in Athlone, County Roscommon, on 15 July 1970, the eldest of six children. He attended Cloonakilla National School in Bealnamulla and St. Aloysius College in Athlone, before studying for the priesthood at St. Patrick's Society for the Foreign Missions in Kiltegan, County Wicklow, and the Pontifical Gregorian University in Rome.

Duignan was ordained as a priest for the Diocese of Elphin on 17 July 1994.

== Presbyteral ministry ==
After completing a licentiate in dogmatic theology in 1995, Duignan's first pastoral assignments were as a curate in the cathedral parish in Sligo and chaplain to the local Institute of Technology, before returning to Rome to complete doctoral studies in contemporary trinitarian theology at the Pontifical Gregorian University.

Duignan returned to Ireland in 2001, serving as a curate in the parish of Cliffoney and teaching theology, philosophy and religious education at St Angela's College, before being appointed full-time lecturer in religious education and chaplain at St Angela's College in 2005, and subsequently its director of religious education, theology and chaplaincy programmes. In the same year, he was also appointed assistant diocesan secretary for the Diocese of Elphin.

Duignan was appointed diocesan director of the permanent diaconate in 2008, and subsequently national director in 2014. In the same year, he was also appointed chancellor, diocesan secretary and episcopal vicar for education and formation for the Diocese of Elphin, and subsequently as financial administrator in 2018.

== Episcopal ministry ==
=== Bishop of Clonfert ===
Duignan was appointed Bishop-elect of Clonfert by Pope Francis on 16 July 2019. He received episcopal ordination from his predecessor, John Kirby, on 13 October in St Brendan's Cathedral, Loughrea.

=== Bishop of Clonfert and Galway and Kilmacduagh ===
Following the announcement by Pope Francis on 16 November 2021 that the Dioceses of Clonfert and Galway, Kilmacduagh and Kilfenora would be united in persona episcopi, the first-ever union of its kind in Ireland, (Note: Irish dioceses have been merged in the past–for example, Galway and Kilmacduagh in the 19th century–by leaving positions vacant and naming apostolic administrators rather than uniting two dioceses under a single ordinary.) Duignan was appointed Bishop of Galway and Kilmacduagh and Apostolic Administrator of Kilfenora in addition to his appointment as Bishop of Clonfert on 11 February 2022.

He was installed on 1 May in the Cathedral of Our Lady Assumed into Heaven and St Nicholas, Galway.
