= Lisdoonvarna/Kilshanny =

- Roman Catholic parish
- Location in Ireland
- Coordinates: 53°01′49″N 9°17′22″W
- Country: Ireland
- Province: Munster
- County: County Clare

Government
  - Dáil Éireann: Clare
- Time zone: UTC+0 (WET)
  - Summer (DST): UTC-1 (IST (WEST))

Lisdoonvarna/Kilshanny parish is a parish in County Clare, Ireland, and part of the Kilfenora Deanery of the Roman Catholic Diocese of Galway, Kilmacduagh and Kilfenora. The parishes Lisdoonvarna and Kilshanny amalgamated in the 1980s.

Current (2021) parish priest is Robert McNamara.

The parish is an amalgamation of the mediaeval parishes of Kilmoon, Killeany, Killilagh and Owghtory.

The main church of the parish is the Church of Corpus Christi in Lisdoonvarna, built in 1868. The second church of the parish is the Church of St. Augustine in Kilshanny. This church was blessed in 1894 by bishop Francis McCormack. This is a descendant of the earlier abbey by the Canons Regular of St. Augustine founded in 1189. Third church is the Church of our Lady of Lourdes in Toovaghera. This church is built in 1878. The coastal village Doolin has a church built in 1821 named the Church of the Holy Rosary.

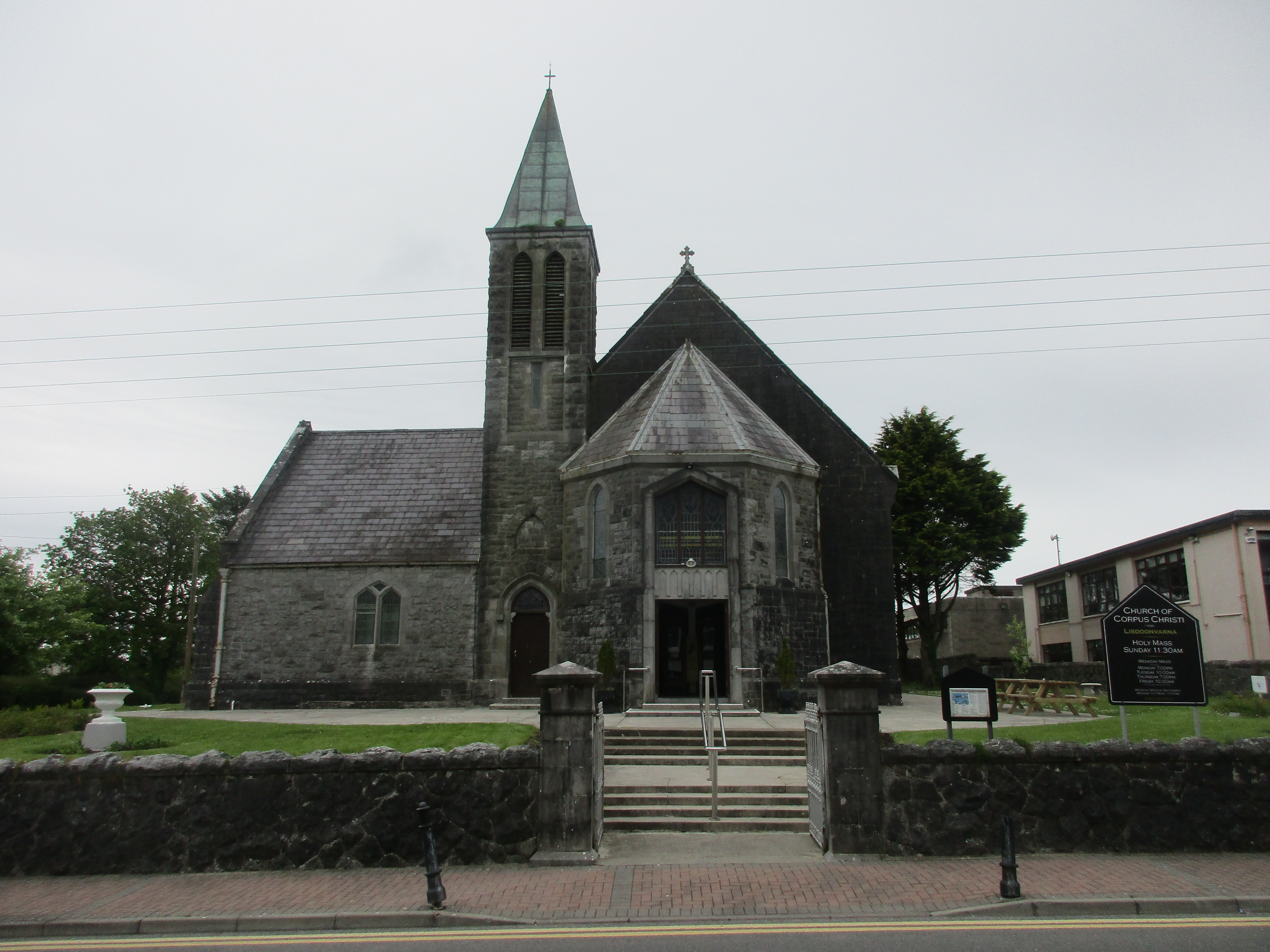
Corpus Christi Church, Lisdoonvarna

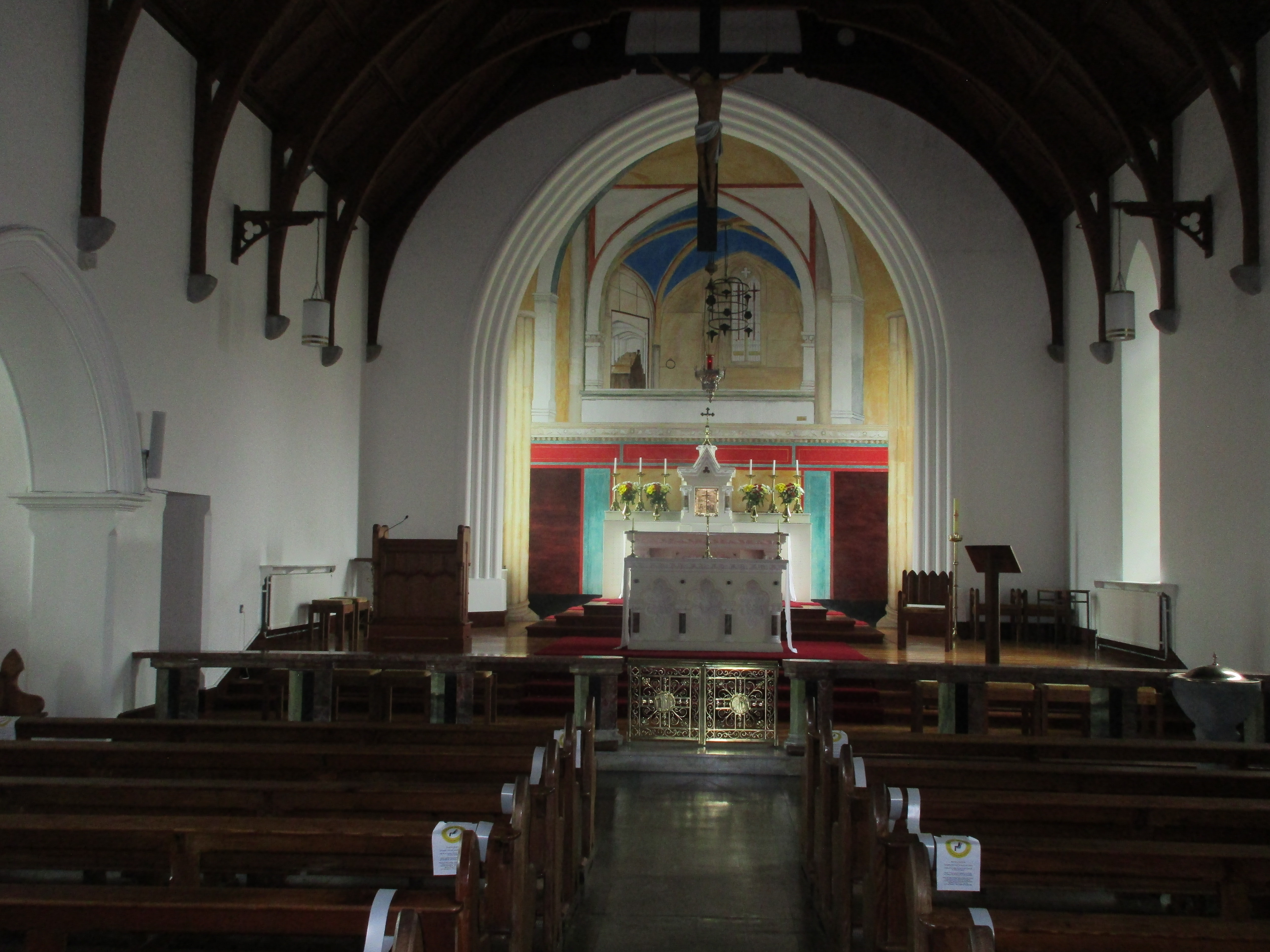
Altar Corpus Christi Church, Lisdoonvarna. Note the railing, removed in most churches.

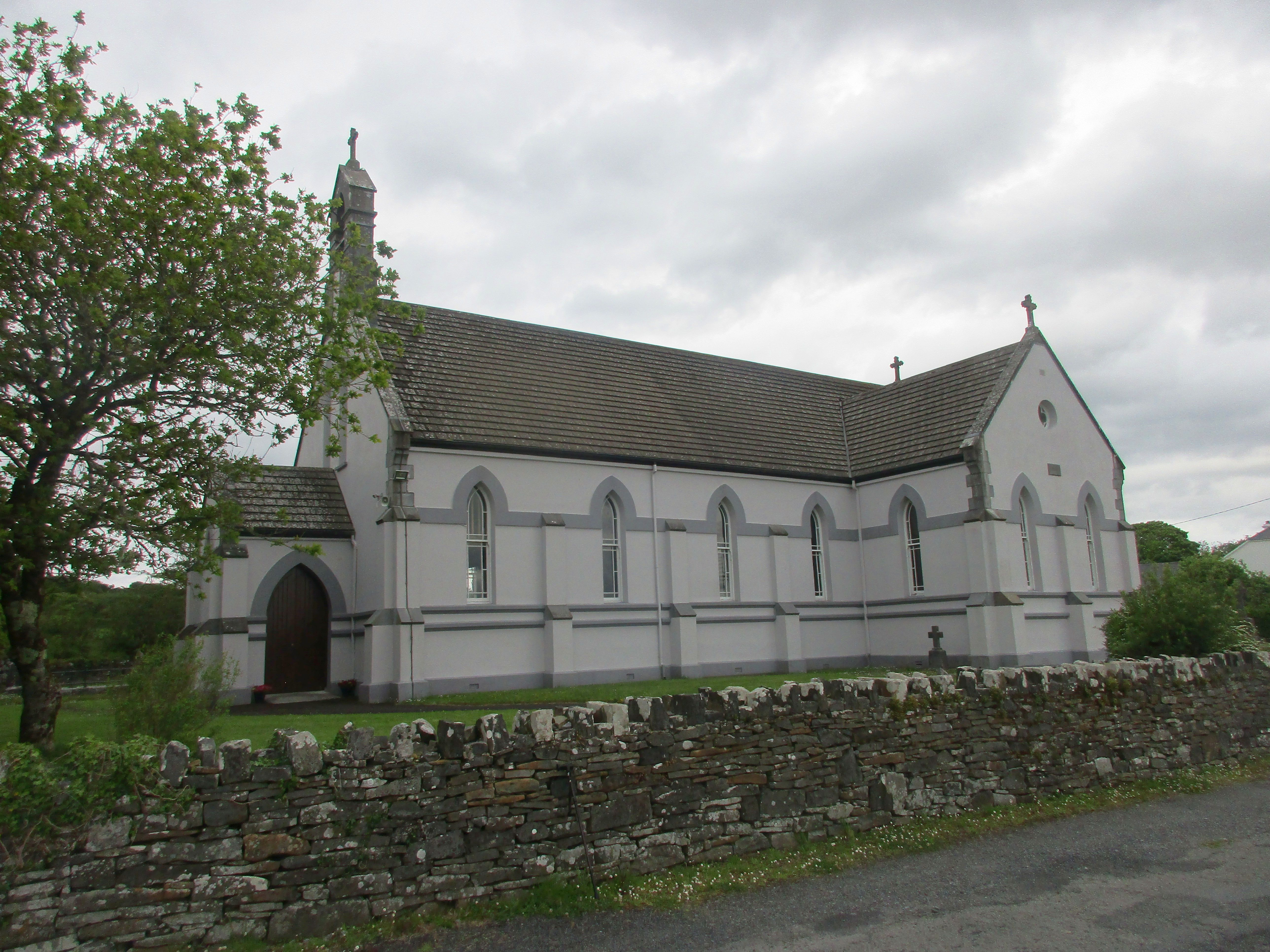
St. Augustine's Church, Kilshanny

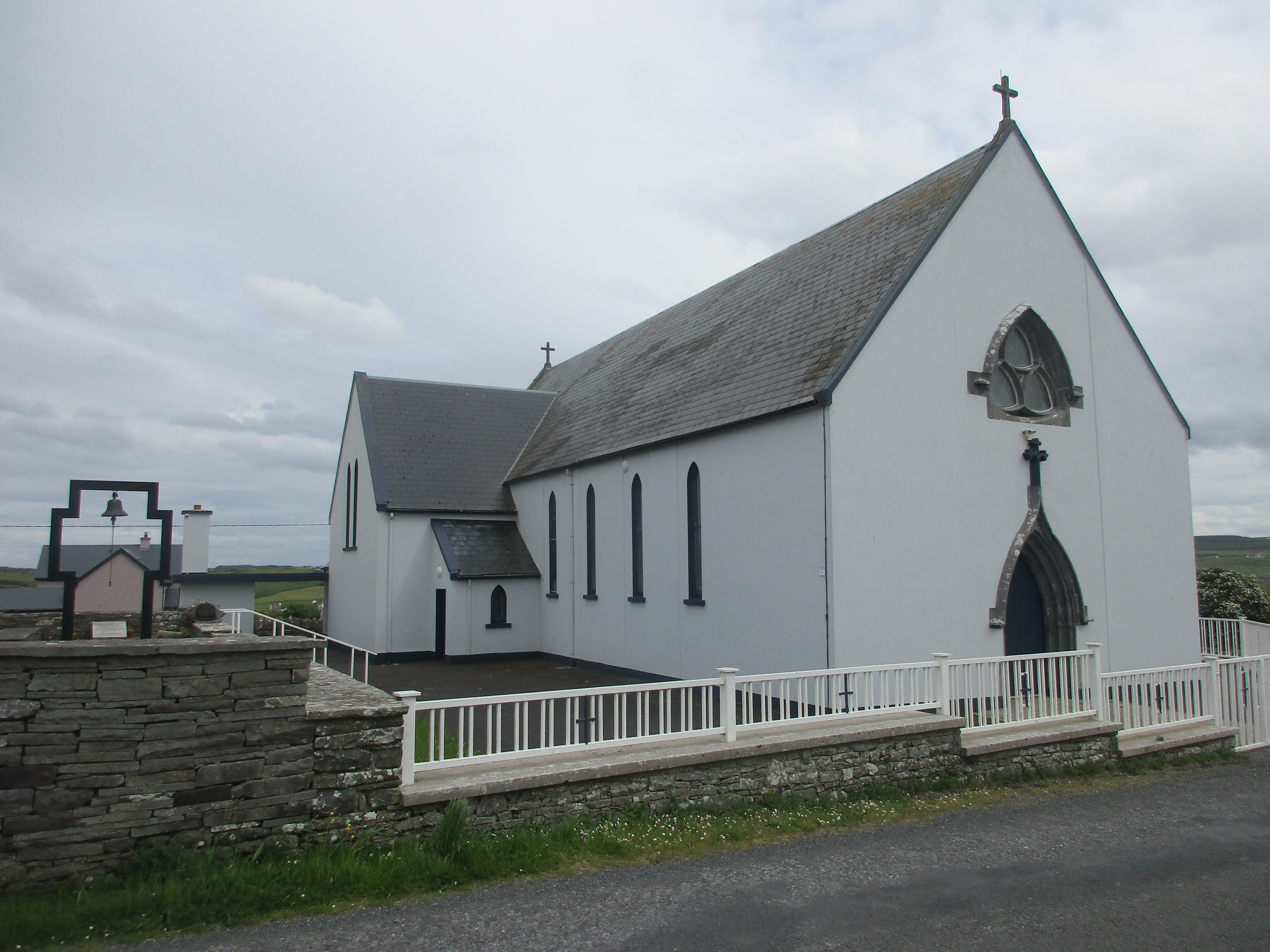
Church of the Holy Rosary, Doolin

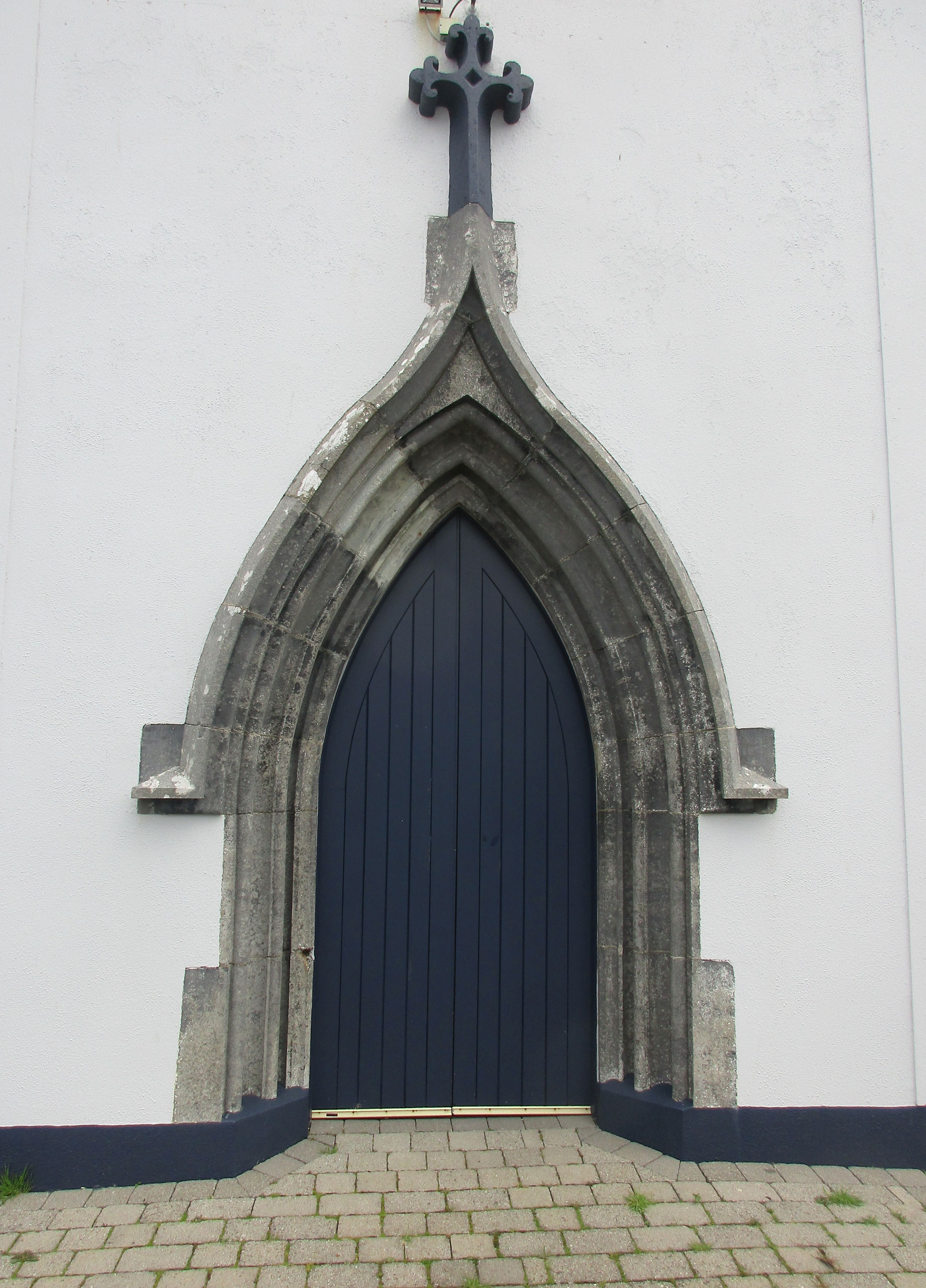
Main entrance of the Church of the Holy Rosary in Doolin. Note the stonework around the door, showing that the church is way older than its modern looks

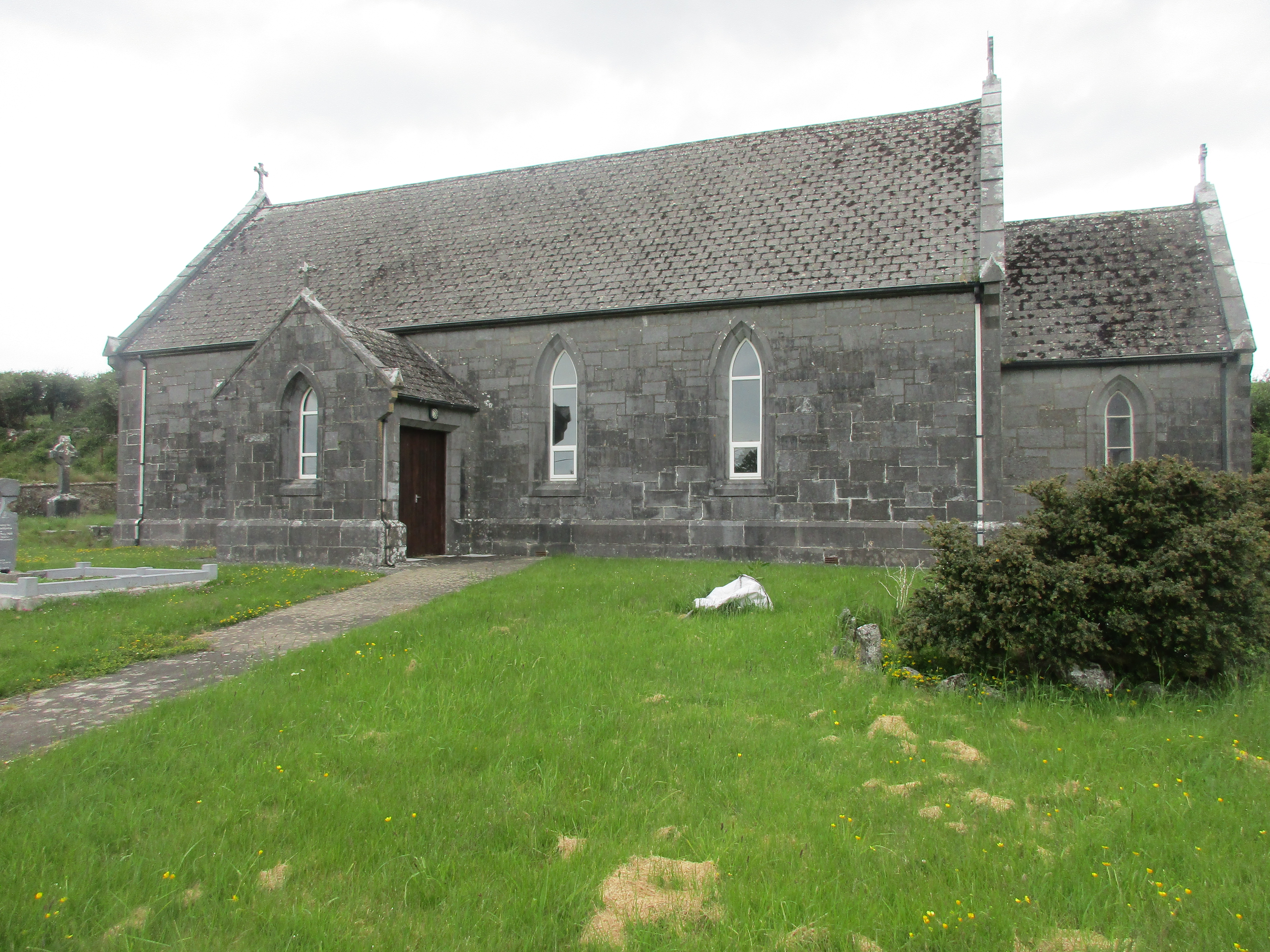
Church of our Lady of Lourdes, Toovaghera

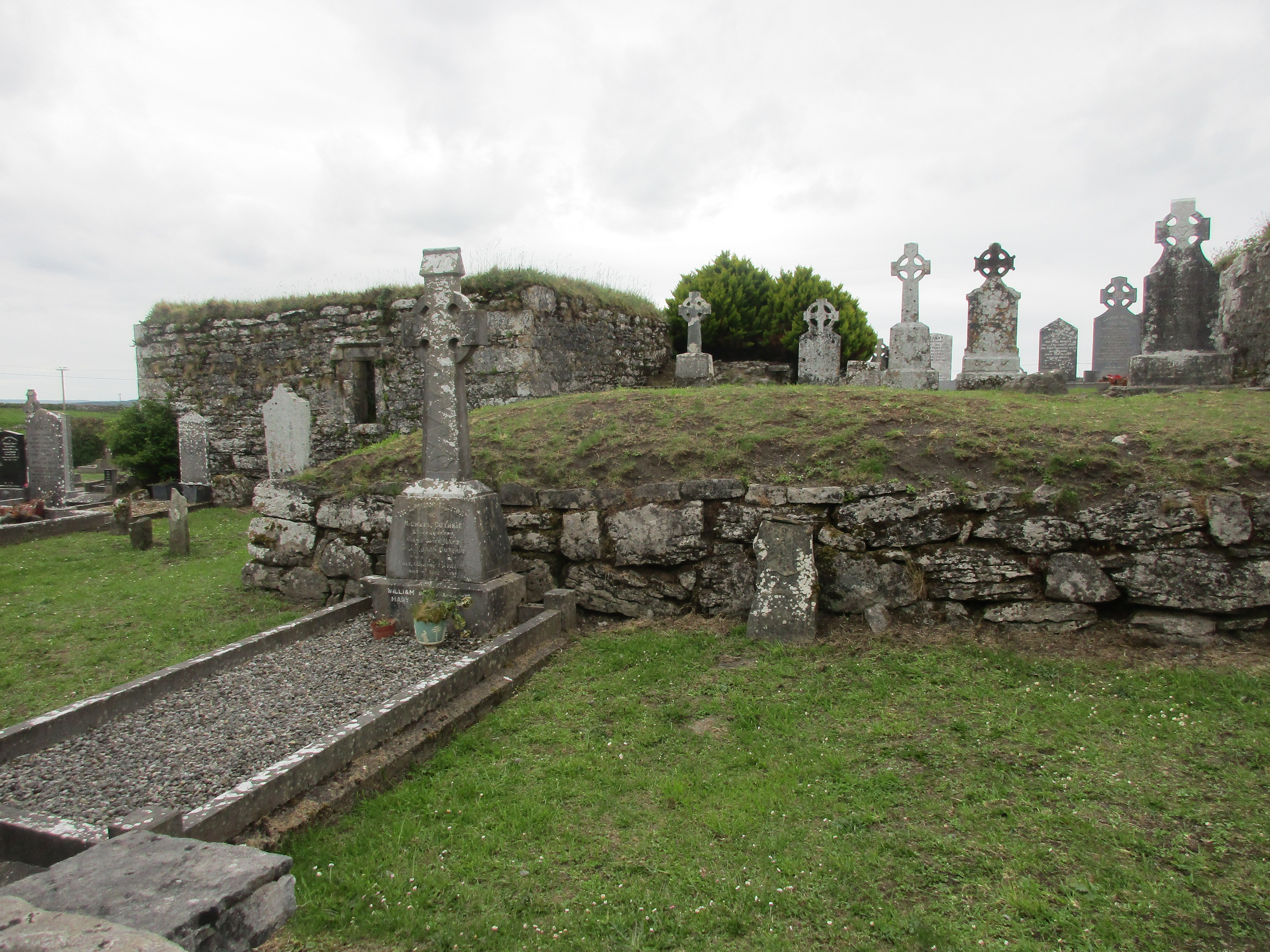
Kilmoon Church (left, in ruin) and graveyard

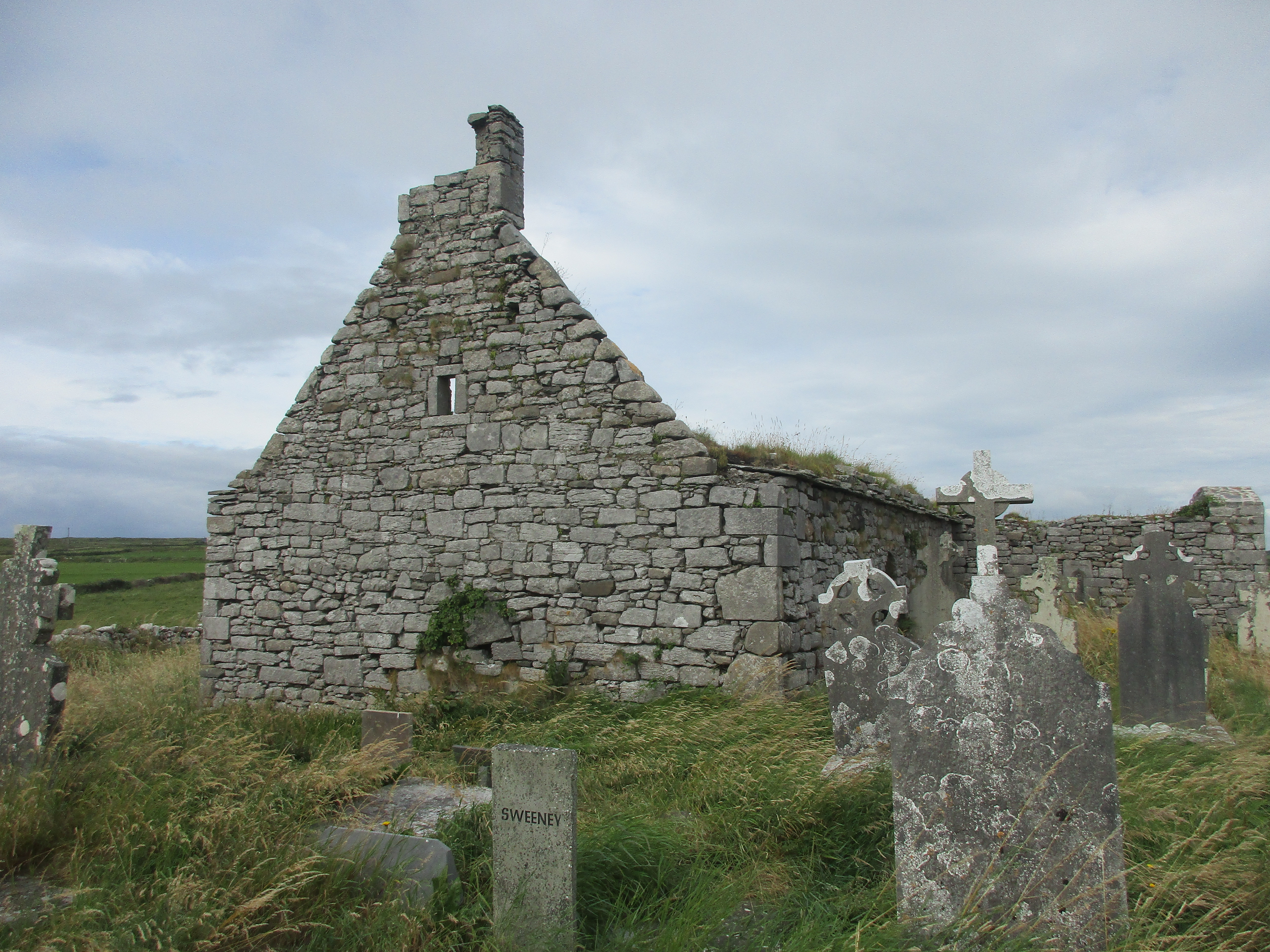
The ruin of Killiagh Church in Doolin

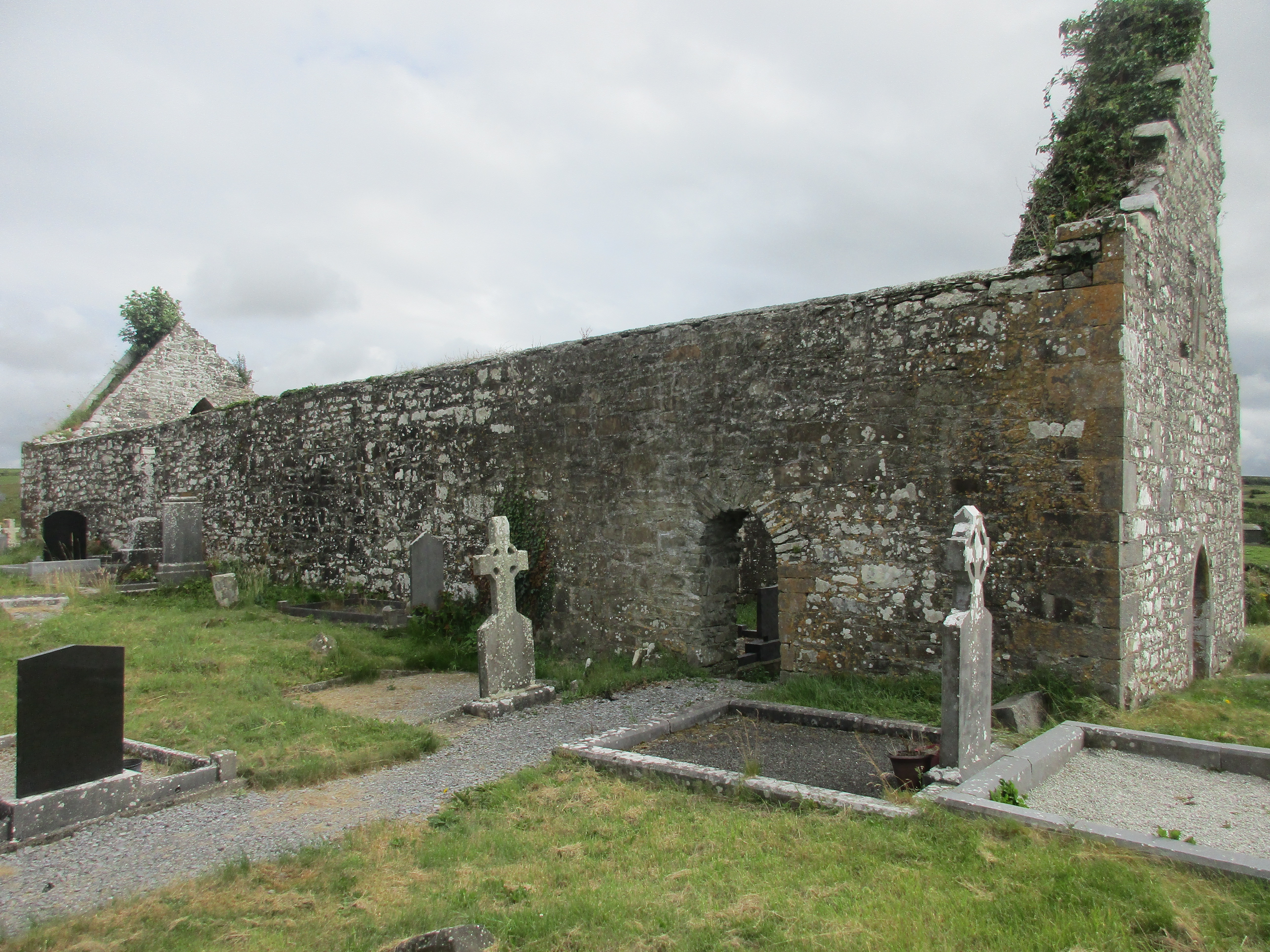
The north wall of the ruin of the Abbey near Kilshanny

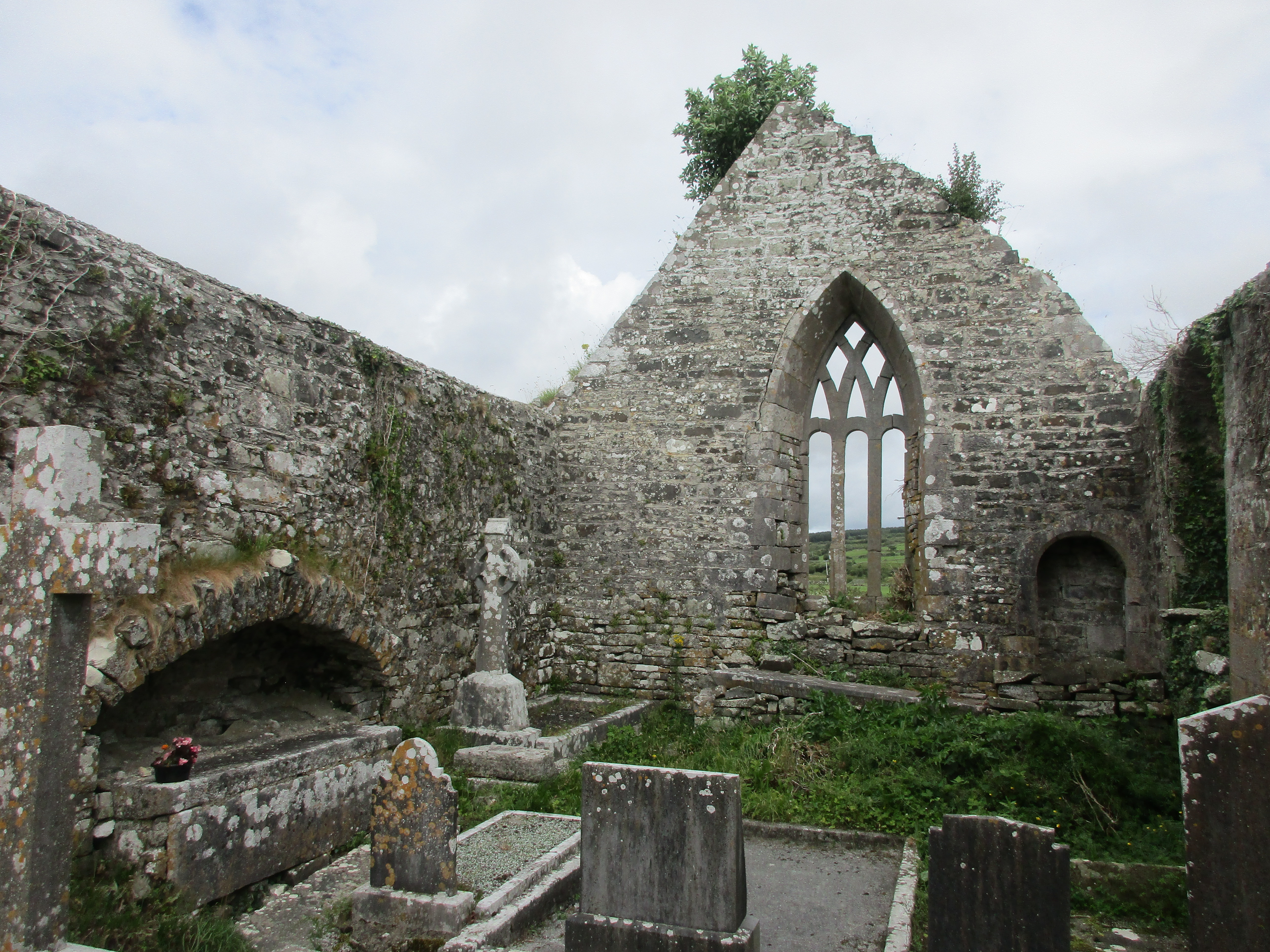
The east wall (inside) of Kilshanny Abbey
