= Lawrence O'Donnell (disambiguation) =

Lawrence O'Donnell is an American television anchor, screenwriter and commentator.

Lawrence O'Donnell also may refer to:

- Lawrence O'Donnell (general) (1933–2026), Australian Army officer
- Lawrence O'Donnell, pseudonymous science-fiction writing duo also known as Lewis Padgett

== See also ==
- The Last Word with Lawrence O'Donnell, TV program anchored by the above journalist
- Laurence O'Donnell (died 1855), Roman Catholic Bishop of Galway
