= Eamonn Casey =

Irish Catholic prelate (1927–2017)

The Most Reverend Eamonn Casey
- Bishop of Galway and Kilmacduagh
- Diocese: Galway
- Appointed: 21 July 1976
- Term ended: 6 May 1992
- Predecessor: Michael Browne
- Successor: James McLoughlin
- Previous post: Bishop of Kerry (1969–1976)

Orders
- Ordination: 17 June 1951 (Priest)
- Consecration: 9 November 1969 by Gaetano Alibrandi

Personal details
- Born: 24 April 1927 Firies, County Kerry, Ireland
- Died: 13 March 2017 (aged 89) Newmarket-on-Fergus, County Clare, Ireland
- Denomination: Roman Catholic
- Children: 1 son

Eamonn Casey (24 April 1927 – 13 March 2017) was an Irish Catholic priest who served as bishop of Galway and Kilmacduagh in Ireland from 1976 to 1992. He was appointed Chairman of Trócaire following the organisation’s establishment in 1973, where he shone a spotlight on situations of injustice overseas, particularly in El Salvador, South Africa, Mozambique, Uganda, Malawi and the Philippines.

His resignation in 1992, after it was revealed he had had an affair with an American woman, Annie Murphy, was a significant event in the history of the Irish Catholic Church. Casey fraudulently made covert payments for the boy's maintenance from diocesan funds.

Subsequently, several women accused Casey of sexual abuse, with two receiving compensation following a High Court trial. One of the women, his niece Patricia Donovan, alleged in 2019 that she was repeatedly raped by Casey when she was five years old and was sexually assaulted by him for more than a decade.

Casey was removed from public ministry in 2007 and lived in a nursing home from 2011 until his death in 2017.

== Priest and bishop ==
Casey was born on 24 April 1927 in Firies, County Kerry. He was educated in Limerick before training for the priesthood at St Patrick's College, Maynooth. Casey was ordained a priest for the Diocese of Limerick on 17 June 1951 and appointed Bishop of Kerry on 17 July 1969.

Casey was a co-founder of the British housing charity Shelter while chaplain to the Irish diaspora in London in the 1960s.

He held this position until 1976, when he was appointed Bishop of Galway and Kilmacduagh and apostolic administrator of Kilfenora. While in Galway, Casey was seen as a progressive. It marked a change in the diocese, which had been led by Michael Browne (Bishop from 1937 to 1976), known for his conservative approach.

Casey held a prominent position within the Irish Catholic hierarchy during his tenure, and served as bishop until his resignation in 1992. He was a friend and colleague of another highly prominent Irish priest, Father Michael Cleary.

== Views ==
=== Irish emigrants ===
Casey worked aiding Irish emigrants in Britain.

=== Apartheid South Africa ===
As an outspoken critic of apartheid, Bishop Casey called on the Irish Rugby Football Union to cancel a proposed tour of South Africa in 1981. He was heavily involved in calls for the Government of Ireland to introduce trade sanctions against South Africa. In late March 1986, the Irish government announced a ban on imports of fruit and vegetables from South Africa.

He was a vocal supporter of the Dunnes Stores' staff who were locked out from 1982 to 1986 for refusing to sell goods from apartheid South Africa. However, Dunnes striker Mary Manning wrote in her memoir Striking Back that when the strikers initially asked Bishop Casey for support, he replied with a letter declining to support the strike and criticizing the idea of economic sanctions against South Africa.

=== US foreign policy ===
Casey attended the funeral of the murdered Archbishop of San Salvador, Monsignor Óscar Romero. He witnessed first hand the massacre of those attending the funeral by government forces. He then became a vocal opponent of United States foreign policy in Central America, and, as a result, opposed the 1984 visit of United States President Ronald Reagan to Ireland, refusing to meet him when he came to Galway.

== Sexual and financial scandal, and forced resignation ==
In 1992, it was reported that, despite the vow of chastity undertaken by Catholic clergy, Casey had had a sexual relationship in the early 1970s with American woman Annie Murphy. When Murphy became pregnant, Casey was determined that the child should be given up for adoption in order to avoid any scandal for himself or the Catholic church. By contrast, Murphy was determined to accept responsibility for her child, and she returned to the United States with their son, Peter, who was born in 1974 in Dublin. Casey made covert payments for the boy's maintenance; these payments were fraudulently made from diocesan funds and channeled through intermediaries. In order to continue the cover up of his affair with Murphy and his fraudulent activities, Casey refused to develop a relationship with his son, or acknowledge him. Murphy was very disappointed by this, and in the early 1990s contacted The Irish Times to tell the truth about Casey's hypocrisy and deception. Having been exposed, Casey reluctantly admitted that he had "sinned" and wronged the boy, his mother, and "God, his church and the clergy and people of the dioceses of Galway and Kerry", and his embezzlement of church funds. He resigned as bishop amidst controversy and subsequently left the country. Murphy published a book, Forbidden Fruit, in 1993, revealing the truth of their relationship and the son she bore by Casey and highlighting alleged systemic issues within the Catholic Church in Ireland.

At a conference for Cherish, an Irish Catholic charity established to support unmarried mothers, Casey said, "It is difficult to understand how the total rejection of their child . . . could be reconciled with Christian love and forgiveness.". Yet of his own son, he told Murphy: "He is not my son. He's entirely yours now."

Casey was ordered by the Vatican to leave Ireland and became a missionary alongside members of the Missionary Society of St. James in a rural parish in Ecuador, whose language (Spanish) he did not speak. During this time, he travelled long distances to reach the widely scattered members of his parish but did not travel to meet his own son. After his missionary tenure was completed, Casey took a position in the parish of St. Paul's in Haywards Heath, West Sussex.

In 2005, Casey was investigated in conjunction with the sexual abuse scandal in Galway, Kilmacduagh and Kilfenora diocese, and cleared of any wrongdoing. In 2019, it emerged that Casey had faced at least three accusations of sexual abuse before his death, with two High Court cases being settled. The Kerry diocese confirmed that it had received allegations against him, that Gardaí and health authorities had been informed, and that the person concerned was offered support by the diocese.

Casey was succeeded by his secretary, James McLoughlin, who served in the post until his own retirement on 3 July 2005.

He returned to Ireland in 2006 with his reputation destroyed and was not permitted to say Mass in public.

== Sexual abuse allegations ==
Beginning in 2001, a total of five women have made allegations to the Church and to the Irish government that they were sexually abused by Casey.

One of the women was his niece Patricia Donovan, who alleged in 2005, and again in 2019, that she was raped by Casey when she was five years old and assaulted sexually by him for more than a decade.

Casey was removed from public ministry by the Vatican in 2007, following a number of such allegations. But this was not publicly revealed and Casey retired from ministry in a normal way and lived out the last ten years of his life untroubled. He denied all the allegations against him, and State prosecutors were aware of them but did not press charges.

In 2025 however, Casey’s remains were disinterred from Galway Cathedral and returned to his family.

== Illness and death ==
In August 2011, Casey, in poor health, was admitted to a nursing home in County Clare. He died on 13 March 2017, at age 89. He was interred in Galway cathedral's crypt Subsequently, following a consultation, his remains were returned to his family in July 2025, making him the first senior cleric in Ireland to be disinterred following posthumous concerns about his conduct.

== Legacy ==
Writing in The Irish Times, historian Diarmaid Ferriter described Casey as "a sexist hypocrite", An obituary in The Herald reported that he "liked fast cars... and was banned for drink driving".. Numerous outlets reported on his fraudulent use of church funds amounting to hundreds of thousands of pounds.

== In popular culture ==
Eamonn Casey is the subject of Martin Egan's song "Casey", sung by Christy Moore. He is also the subject of the Saw Doctors' song "Howya Julia".
