= Francis McCormack =

Irish Catholic bishop

The Most Reverend Francis McCormack
- Bishop of Galway and Kilmacduagh and Apostolic Administrator Emeritus of Kilfenora
- Native name: Proinsias Mac Cormaic
- Diocese: Galway, Kilmacduagh and Kilfenora
- Installed: 26 April 1887
- Term ended: 21 October 1908
- Predecessor: Thomas Joseph Carr
- Successor: Thomas O'Dea
- Other posts: Coadjutor Bishop of Achonry 1871–75; Bishop of Achonry 1875–87; Titular Bishop of Claudiopolis in Isauria; Titular Archbishop of Nisibin

Orders
- Ordination: 10 June 1862 (Priest)
- Consecration: 21 November 1871 (Bishop)

Personal details
- Born: Francis McCormack; 8 April 1833 Ballintubber, County Mayo, Ireland
- Died: 14 November 1909 (aged 76)
- Buried: Crypt of Cathedral of Our Lady Assumed into Heaven and St Nicholas, Galway
- Denomination: Roman Catholic Church
- Education: Maynooth College

Francis McCormack (8 April 1833 – 14 November 1909) was an Irish Catholic bishop of the 19th and 20th century.

== Early life and family ==
Francis Joseph McCormack was born in Ballintubber in 1833. He studied for the priesthood in Maynooth College. His nephew, Captain Patrick McCormack, was shot dead on Bloody Sunday (1920) in disputed circumstances .

== Priest ==
McCormack was ordained a priest in 1862.

== Bishop ==
McCormack was consecrated a bishop by John McEvilly, Archbishop of Tuam. He was Bishop of Achonry 1871 to 1887. In 1879 a minor famine saw 300 people beg food from the bishop at Christmas. He wrote a letter to the Land League, contrasting the vast sums spent on the Anglo-Zulu War and Second Anglo-Afghan War with the minimal amount the government spent on famine relief. He also condemned "assisted emigration," whereby landlords paid the fare to get rid of unwanted tenants.

In 1887 McCormack was appointed to the Diocese of Galway and Kilmacduagh where he served until he retired due to ill health in 1908. He died in 1909. He is buried in Galway Cathedral crypt, his papers are stored in the Diocesan archive.
