= John Healy (bishop) =

Irish Catholic archbishop

- Archbishop of Tuam
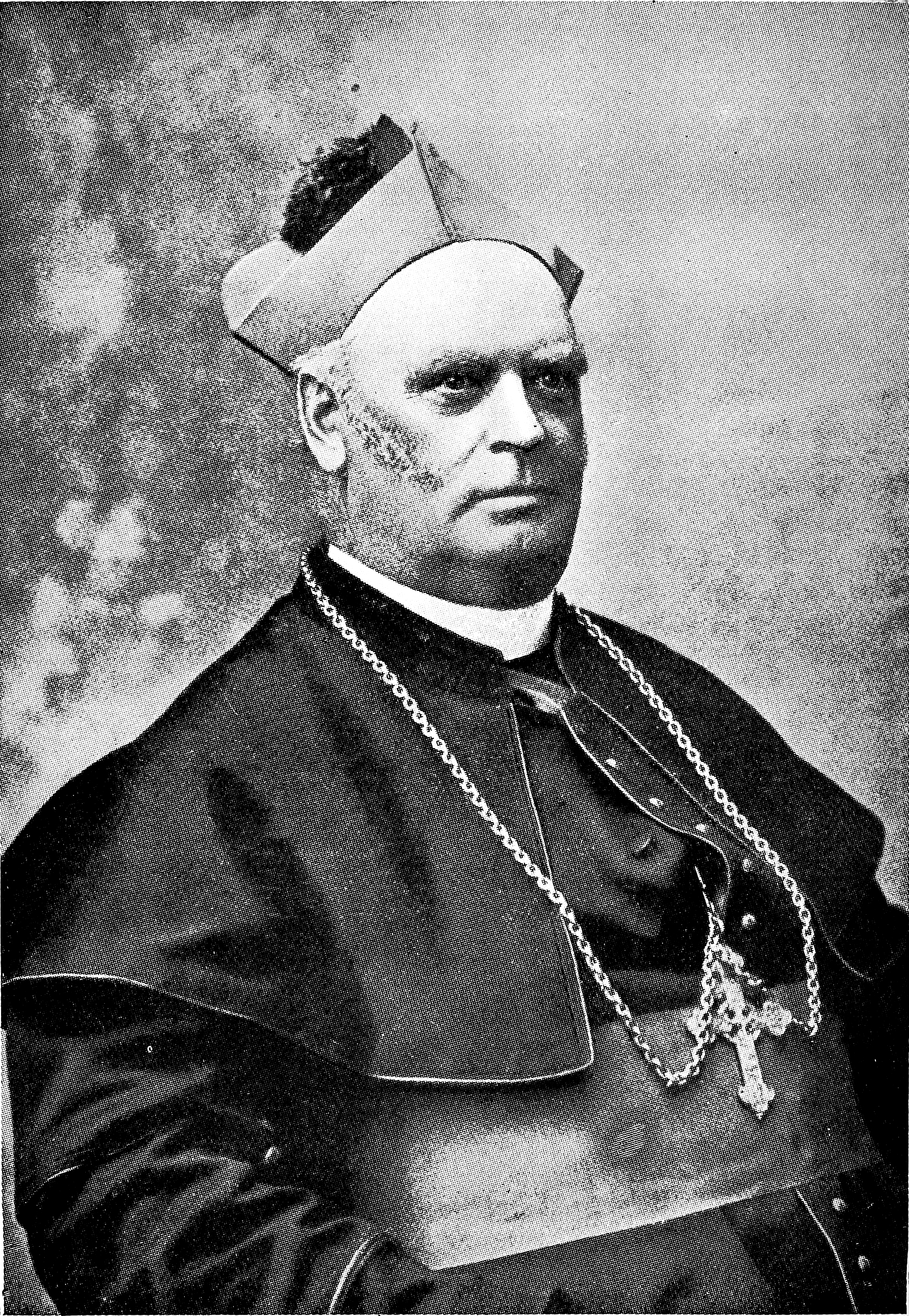
- Church: Catholic Church
- Archdiocese: Archdiocese of Tuam
- In office: 13 February 1903 – 19 March 1918
- Predecessor: John McEvilly
- Successor: Thomas Gilmartin
- Previous posts: Bishop of Clonfert (1896-1903); Titular Bishop of Macri (1884-1896); Coadjutor Bishop of Clonfert (1884-1896)

Orders
- Ordination: September 1867
- Consecration: 31 August 1884 by John McEvilly

Personal details
- Born: 2 January 1841 Ballinafad, County Sligo, United Kingdom of Great Britain and Ireland
- Died: 19 March 1918 (aged 77)

Styles of Archbishop John Healy
- Reference style: The Most Reverend
- Spoken style: Your Grace or Archbishop

The Most Rev. Dr John Healy (1841–1918) was an Irish clergyman of the Catholic Church. He served as Lord Bishop of Clonfert from 1896 to 1903 and as Lord Archbishop of Tuam from 1903 to 1918.

Born on 2 January 1841 in Ballinafad, a village in the south of County Sligo in the west of Ireland, Healy was educated at Maynooth College, where he was ordained a priest in September 1867. He then served as a curate and parish priest in the Diocese of Elphin, before being offered two professorial chairs at Maynooth, those of Theology and Classics. He accepted the first and held it until 1883, when he became Prefect of Maynooth. He also edited The Irish Ecclesiastical Record in 1883.

== Bishop ==
He was appointed Coadjutor Bishop of the Diocese of Clonfert and Titular Bishop of Macri on 26 June 1884. His episcopal ordination took place on 31 August 1884. He succeeded as the Diocesan Bishop of Clonfert on 15 August 1896.

== Archbishop of Tuam ==
He translated to the Archbishopric of Tuam on 13 February 1903, where he reestablished pilgrimage to Croagh Patrick. He was also a Senator of the National University of Ireland (having been part of the campaign to establish it), a governor of University College, Galway, and a member of the Board of Agriculture. He once told Irish Nationalists that before demanding self-government they should make themselves fit for it.

Archbishop Healy died in office on 19 March 1918, aged 77. A biography of his life was published by The Rev. P.J. Joyce in 1931, titled John Healy, Archbishop of Tuam (H. Gill and Sons, Dublin 1931). Healy was a noted academic, and published a number of works on Irish and church history, with a particular emphasis on Early Christian Ireland.

== Works ==
Irish Essays; literary and historical

- The Ancient Irish Church (1892)
- Ireland's Ancient Schools and Scholars (1890). A revised and expanded second edition was issued in 1893. A fourth edition was published in 1902.
- Maynooth College; its centenary history. xxiv, 774 p. Dublin: Browne & Nolan (1895)

Catholic Church titles
Preceded by Patrick Duggan	Bishop of Clonfert; 1896–1903	Succeeded by Thomas O'Dea
Preceded by John McEvilly	Archbishop of Tuam; 1903–1918	Succeeded by Thomas Gilmartin
