= Thomas Gilmartin =

Irish clergyman

The Most Reverend Thomas Gilmartin, D.D.
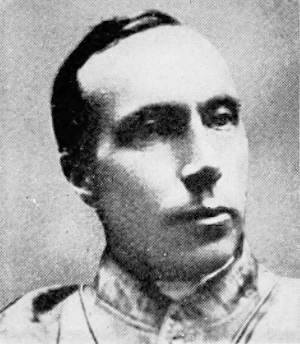
- Church: Roman Catholic
- Diocese: Clonfert (1909-1918); Tuam (1918-1939)

Personal details
- Born: Thomas Patrick Gilmartin; 18 May 1861 Castlebar, County Mayo, Ireland
- Died: 14 October 1939 (aged 78) Tuam, County Galway, Ireland

Thomas Patrick Gilmartin (18 May 1861 – 14 October 1939) was an Irish clergyman of the Roman Catholic Church. He served as Bishop of Clonfert from 1909 to 1918 and Archbishop of Tuam from 1918 to 1939.

== Life ==
He was born in Castlebar, County Mayo, Ireland on 18 May 1861, the son of Michael Gilmartin, Rinshiona, Castlebar. He was educated at the Franciscan monastery boys school in Errew and at O'Dea's Academy in Castlebar. He attended St Jarlath's College in Tuam, and then St Patrick's College, Maynooth. Following his ordination to the priesthood in 1883, he became a professor of mathematics and natural science at St Jarlath's.

In 1891, Gilmartin served as Dean of Formation and Vice-President of St Patrick's College, Maynooth. He was awarded a Doctor of Divinity by Rome in 1905.

He was appointed the Bishop of the Diocese of Clonfert by the Holy See on 3 July 1909 and was consecrated on 13 February 1910 by the Most Reverend John Healy, Archbishop of Tuam. On the death of Archbishop Healy, he was translated to the Metropolitan see of Tuam as archbishop on 10 July 1918.

During the Irish War of Independence, Archbishop Gilmartin spoke out strongly against violence. In January 1920, he criticized the "undisguised ruffianism" in the rebel ranks. Gilmartin counseled his priests that whatever their personal political beliefs, they should not take an aggressive part on behalf of either side. However, many younger clerics supported Sinn Féin and the IRA.

Gilmartin was involved in the controversy over the appointment of Letitia Dunbar (a member of the Church of Ireland and graduate of Trinity College, Dublin) to the County Mayo librarianship in 1931.

T.H. White describes meeting the Archbishop on the top of Croagh Patrick on an annual Reek Sunday pilgrimage during the 1930s in his book The Godstone and the Blackymor and having a cup of tea with him on the top after overenthusiastically kissing his ring.

Gilmartin died in office on 14 October 1939, aged 78.

== Works ==
Gilmartin wrote the Memoir of Primate Joseph Dixon in Healy's Centenary History of Maynooth in 1895. He was also a contributor to the Irish Ecclesiastical Record, the Irish Theological Quarterly, and the Catholic Encyclopedia.

== Bibliography ==
- Fryde, E. B.; Greenway, D. E.; Porter, S.; Roy, I., eds. (1986). Handbook of British Chronology (3rd, reprinted 2003 ed.). Cambridge: Cambridge University Press. ISBN 0-521-56350-X.

Catholic Church titles
Preceded by Thomas O'Dea	Bishop of Clonfert; 1909–1918	Succeeded by Thomas O'Doherty
Preceded by John Healy	Archbishop of Tuam; 1918–1939	Succeeded by Joseph Walsh
