= Michael Browne (bishop of Galway) =

Irish prelate

The Most Reverend Michael Browne
- Bishop of Galway and Kilmacduagh
- Browne in 1973
- Predecessor: Thomas O'Doherty
- Successor: Eamonn Casey

Orders
- Ordination: 20 June 1920
- Consecration: 10 August 1938 by Thomas P. Gilmartin

Personal details
- Born: 20 December 1895 Westport, County Mayo, Ireland
- Died: 24 February 1980 (aged 84) Galway, Ireland
- Denomination: Roman Catholic
- Education: St Patrick's College, Maynooth
- Styles
- Reference style: The Most Reverend
- Spoken style: My Lord
- Religious style: Bishop
- Posthumous style: not applicable

Michael J. Browne (20 December 1895 – 24 February 1980) was an Irish prelate of the Roman Catholic Church. He served as Bishop of Galway and Kilmacduagh, Ireland, for almost forty years from 1937 to 1976.

Browne was an important and outspoken member of the Irish hierarchy. His time as Bishop has been described by the historian James S. Donnelly Jr. as "far-reaching and ... controversial", while the historian of Irish Catholicism John Henry Whyte claimed that Browne's "readiness to put forward his views bluntly is welcome at least to the historian".

== Biography ==
Born in Westport in 1895, Browne was ordained to the priesthood on 20 June 1920 for the Archdiocese of Tuam. He later served as professor of moral theology at St. Patrick's College in Maynooth.

On 6 August 1937, at the relatively young age of 41, Browne was appointed Bishop of Galway and Kilmacduagh by Pope Pius XI, receiving his episcopal consecration from Archbishop Thomas Gilmartin on the following 10 August. He supported Taoiseach Éamon de Valera's defence of arrests and police searches for cached IRA arms, declaring, "Any Irishman who assists any foreign power to attack the legitimate authority of his own land is guilty of the most terrible crime against God's law, and there can be no excuse for that crime - not even the pretext of solving partition or of securing unity". (see S-Plan).

In 1939, he was selected by Éamon de Valera to chair the Commission on Vocational Organisation.

Browne was attentive to the state of public morality in the diocese, and James S. Donnelly Jr. has noted his role in directing episcopal and clerical censorship of newsagents and county librarians. Browne was also concerned about public intoxication and other misconduct at the Galway Races, controversies over dancing and the commercial dance halls, as well as immodesty in dress and the closely related issue of so-called "mixed bathing" in Galway and Salthill.

Like other members of the Irish Catholic hierarchy, Browne regularly condemned communism in his pastoral letters. When Cardinal József Mindszenty was detained by Hungary's post-war communist government, Browne in 1949 forwarded protest resolutions from Galway Corporation, Galway County Council and the University College Galway student body to Pope Pius XII. Browne also frequently condemned the Connolly Association, an Irish republican socialist group in Britain close to the Communist Party of Great Britain.

In 1957, in response to a growing tension between Catholics and Protestants at Fethard-on-Sea, including the Fethard-on-Sea boycott, Browne said, "Non-Catholics do not protest against the crime of conspiring to steal the children of a Catholic father, but they try to make political capital when a Catholic people make a peaceful and moderate protest".

The most enduring monument or physical legacy of his time as Bishop is Galway Cathedral which was dedicated in 1965 by Cardinal Cushing of Boston. The site of the old jail had come into the possession of the diocese in 1941 and Browne led the campaign to construct a new Cathedral. This included a 1957 audience with Pope Pius XII where the plans were approved.

Browne attended the Second Vatican Council from 1962 to 1965, and retired in 1976. He died four years later, at the age of 84.

== In literature ==
Bishop Browne is parodied in Breandán Ó hÉithir`s novel Lig Sinn i gCathu, which fictionalised late 1940s Galway as ‘Baile an Chaisil’ and Browne as ‘An tEaspag Ó Maoláin’.

The Irish cabinet minister Noel Browne (no known relation) in his 1986 memoir Against the Tide describes the physical attributes of his episcopal namesake:

"The bishop had a round soft baby face with shimmering clear cornflower-blue eyes, but his mouth was small and mean. Around his great neck was an elegant glinting gold episcopal chain with a simple pectoral gold cross. He wore a ruby ring on his plump finger and wore a slightly ridiculous tiny scull cap on his noble head. The well-filled semi-circular scarlet silk cummerbund and sash neatly divided the lordly prince into two."

Catholic Church titles
Preceded by Thomas O'Doherty	Bishop of Galway and Kilmacduagh; 1937–1976	Succeeded by Eamon Casey
