= McCoy Report =

Report of an inquiry in Ireland

The McCoy Report is an eight-year (1999–2007) inquiry by Elizabeth Healy and Kevin McCoy into the Brothers of Charity Order's "Holy Family School" in Galway, Ireland, and two other locations. The Report was published by the Health Service Executive in December 2007.

== Abuse of disabled children over an extended period ==
The report, which was begun in 1999 and made public in December 2007, found that eleven brothers and seven other staff members were alleged to have abused 21 intellectually disabled children in residential care in the period 1965–1998. By 2007, two members of staff were convicted of abuse, eight had died and the rest had retired. It emerged that the Order had attempted to transfer at least one accused brother to another place.

== Vulnerable people let down by society ==
Jimmy Devins, a junior government minister, regretted that "some of the most vulnerable people in society were let down in the past". Brother Noel Corcoran, head of the Order's services in Ireland, apologized. However the McCoy Report was criticized by Dr Margaret Kennedy for not naming the sex offenders who were convicted or dead, and for interviewing just 21 out of 135 complainants.

== Special government committee ==
In 2010, Kennedy has also criticised the Irish parliament's special committee to enquire into the McCoy Report for not challenging the Brothers who arranged the movements of abusers between Galway, Lota (near Cork city) and Liverpool. Police collusion is suspected and "it seems no one was called to account".

== See also ==
- Sexual abuse scandal in Galway, Kilmacduagh and Kilfenora diocese
