= Kilshanny =

Village and parish in County Clare, Ireland

Kilshanny Cill Seanaigh
- Civil Parish
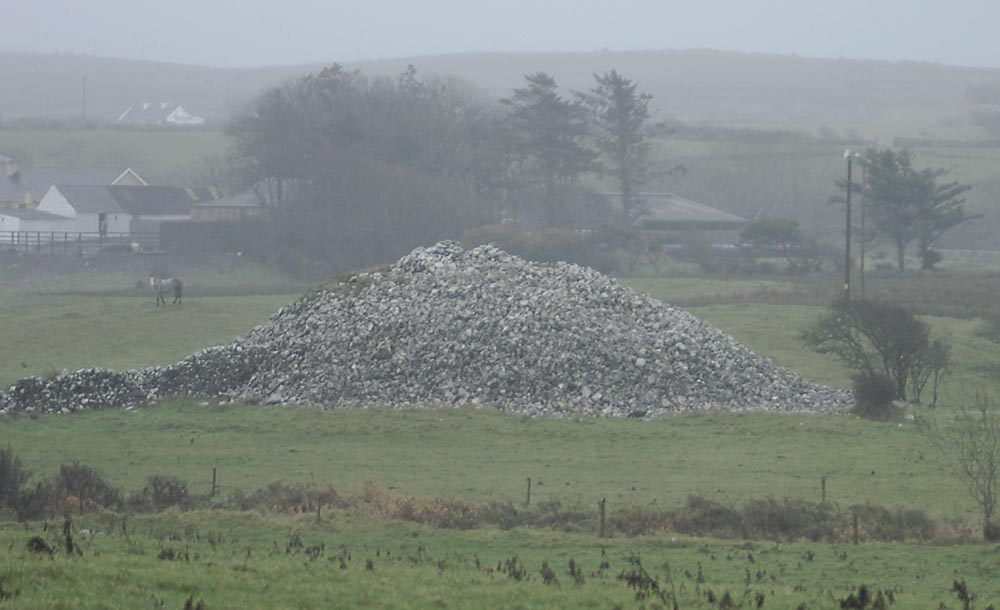
- Carn Connachtach in Kilshanny parish

- Location in Ireland
- Coordinates: 52°58′55″N 9°17′55″W
- Country: Ireland
- Province: Munster
- County: County Clare
- Time zone: UTC+0 (WET)
  - Summer (DST): UTC-1 (IST (WEST))

Kilshanny (Irish: Cill Seanaigh) is a village and a civil parish in County Clare, Ireland.

== Geography ==
It is located on the N67 national secondary road. Today, the village amenities include a pub (Kilshanny House), a primary school (St. Augustine's NS) and the church of St Augustine. Nearby towns and villages are Ennistymon, Lisdoonvarna, Kilfenora, Liscannor, Lahinch and Doolin.

== Parish ==
The parish is part of the Barony of Corcomroe.

Kilshanny is part of the parish of Lisdoonvarna/Kilshanny in the Roman Catholic Diocese of Galway, Kilmacduagh and Kilfenora. Parish churches are "Corpus Christi" in Lisdoonvarna, "Holy Rosary" in Doolin, "Our Lady of Lourdes" in Toovahera and "Saint Augustine's" in Kilshanny (built in 1893).

== Antiquities ==
In Smithstown townland lie the ruins of Smithtown Castle (also known as Ballingown Castle), a former O'Brien stronghold. An attached house was inhabited until 1837, but has since fallen into ruin. In 1600, Hugh Roe O'Donnell stayed here before moving through Kilfenora to "lay waste the countryside around Corcomroe". Honora, daughter of Teige of Smithstown, by marriage became Honora Wingfield, ancestor of the family that held the title of Viscount Powerscourt.

The ruined abbey church of Kilshanny is all that remains of an abbey that may have been founded by early Christian Seanach Garbh, but is traditionally ascribed to St Cuanna. In 1194, the abbey became subservient to Corcomroe Abbey and was dedicated to St Augustine. Its abbot, Florence, was named bishop of Kilfenora in 1273. In 1302, the church became the parish church of Kilshanny, so the abbey seems to have been dissolved by that point. The abbey properties and rights finally passed to one Robert Kinsman. North door and south window of the church are from the transitional period but the other surviving features, including the triple-light east window, are later.

In Ballydeely townland lies a stone mound known as Carn Connachtach or Carn Mic Tails. It rises to around 8 meters and has a base diameter of almost 100 meters. Legends hold that the mound served as the place of inauguration for the chiefs of Corcomroe. There are also tales that it is the burial mound of a whole army from Connacht. Annals do record a battle nearby in 1573, between factions of the O'Briens, which was won by Teige O'Brien. However, the mound is likely of prehistoric origin and may contain Bronze Age cyst graves. It has not been excavated.

== See also ==
- List of towns and villages in Ireland
