= James McLoughlin =

Irish bishop

The Right Reverend James McLoughlin
- Bishop Emeritus of Galway and Kilmacduagh and Apostolic Administrator of Kilfenora
- Diocese: Galway, Kilmacduagh and Kilfenora
- Installed: 1993
- Term ended: 2005
- Predecessor: Eamon Casey
- Successor: Martin Drennan

Orders
- Ordination: 20 June 1954 (Priest)
- Consecration: 28 March 1993 (Bishop)

Personal details
- Born: James McLoughlin; 9 April 1929 Cross Street, Galway, Ireland
- Died: 25 November 2005 Galway Clinic
- Buried: Cathedral Crypt, Galway Cathedral
- Denomination: Roman Catholic Church
- Education: Maynooth College

James McLoughlin (9 April 1929 – 25 November 2005) was the Roman Catholic Bishop of Galway and Kilmacduagh and Apostolic Administrator of Kilfenora, Ireland for twelve years from 1993 to 2005.

== Early life and education ==
McLoughlin was born in Cross Street in the centre of Galway City on 9 April 1929. His parents ran a small wholesale grocery business. He attended the Patrician Brothers primary school in Nuns' Island and St. Mary's College in Galway. He studied for the priesthood at Maynooth and was ordained on 20 June 1954.

== Priestly ministry ==
After ordination he was appointed to the teaching staff of St. Mary's College, Galway where he developed interests in basketball and amateur dramatics, and was appointed diocesan secretary in September 1965, bring to that role a reserved dedication to duty, meticulous planning and financial acumen.

He left full-time teaching in 1983 and was appointed parish priest of Galway Cathedral.

== Bishop ==
On 10 February 1993, the year after the sensational resignation of Bishop Eamon Casey, McLoughlin was appointed by Pope John Paul II as bishop of Galway and Kilmacduagh. His consecration took place in Galway Cathedral on 28 March 1993. After his death one obituary noted that McLouglhin's "quiet demeanour...intimate knowledge of Galway and his being a native son, made him the ideal man to assume responsibility for the diocese when Bishop Eamonn Casey resigned."

He served as chairman of the finance and general planning committee of the Irish Bishops' Conference.

In 2003 he was one of the first Irish bishops to announce the clustering of parishes in recognition of the falling number of priests, his diocese having had very few vocations or ordinations in the decade up to 2003.

McLoughlin announced his retirement on 23 May 2005 and on 3 July was succeeded as bishop of Galway and Kilmacduagh by Martin Drennan. He lived in Claregalway during his retirement, and died on 25 November 2005 in Galway Clinic. His funeral was held in Galway Cathedral, and he was interred in the crypt beneath the cathedral.
