= Cathedral of Our Lady Assumed into Heaven and St Nicholas, Galway =

Galway Cathedral
- Cathedral of Our Lady Assumed into Heaven and St Nicholas

- Location within Ireland
- 53°16′31″N 9°03′27″W
- Location: Gaol Road, Galway
- Country: Ireland
- Language(s): English, Irish
- Denomination: Roman Catholic
- Tradition: Roman Rite
- Website: galwaycathedral.ie

History
- Dedication: Our Lady Assumed into Heaven and Nicholas of Myra
- Consecrated: 15 August 1965

Architecture
- Architect: John J. Robinson
- Style: Renaissance Revival
- Groundbreaking: 1958
- Completed: 1965

Administration
- Province: Ecclesiastical Province of Tuam
- Archdiocese: Tuam
- Diocese: Galway and Kilmacduagh

The Cathedral of Our Lady Assumed into Heaven and St Nicholas (Irish language: Ard-Eaglais Mhaighdean na Deastógála agus Naomh Nioclás), commonly known as Galway Cathedral, is a Roman Catholic cathedral in Galway, Ireland.

Construction began in 1958 on the site of the old Galway Gaol. It was completed in 1965, lending it the designation of being "the last great stone cathedral to be built in Europe". It was dedicated, jointly, to Our Lady Assumed into Heaven and to St. Nicholas.

== History ==
A parish chapel was built around 1750 on Middle Street at Lower Abbeygate Street. In 1821 the chapel was replaced with a limestone church built in the Gothic style, and dedicated to St. Patrick. When the Diocese of Galway was established in 1831, St. Patrick's became the pro-cathedral. After the cathedral opened in 1965, St. Patrick's was deconsecrated.

== Opening of the Cathedral ==
The Galway Cathedral was opened on 15 August 1965. President Éamon de Valera lit the sanctuary candle and Cardinal Richard Cushing of Boston delivered a sermon 'Why Build a Cathedral?'. Bishop Michael Browne, Bishop of Galway, was accompanied at the altar by four Archbishops.

== Architecture ==
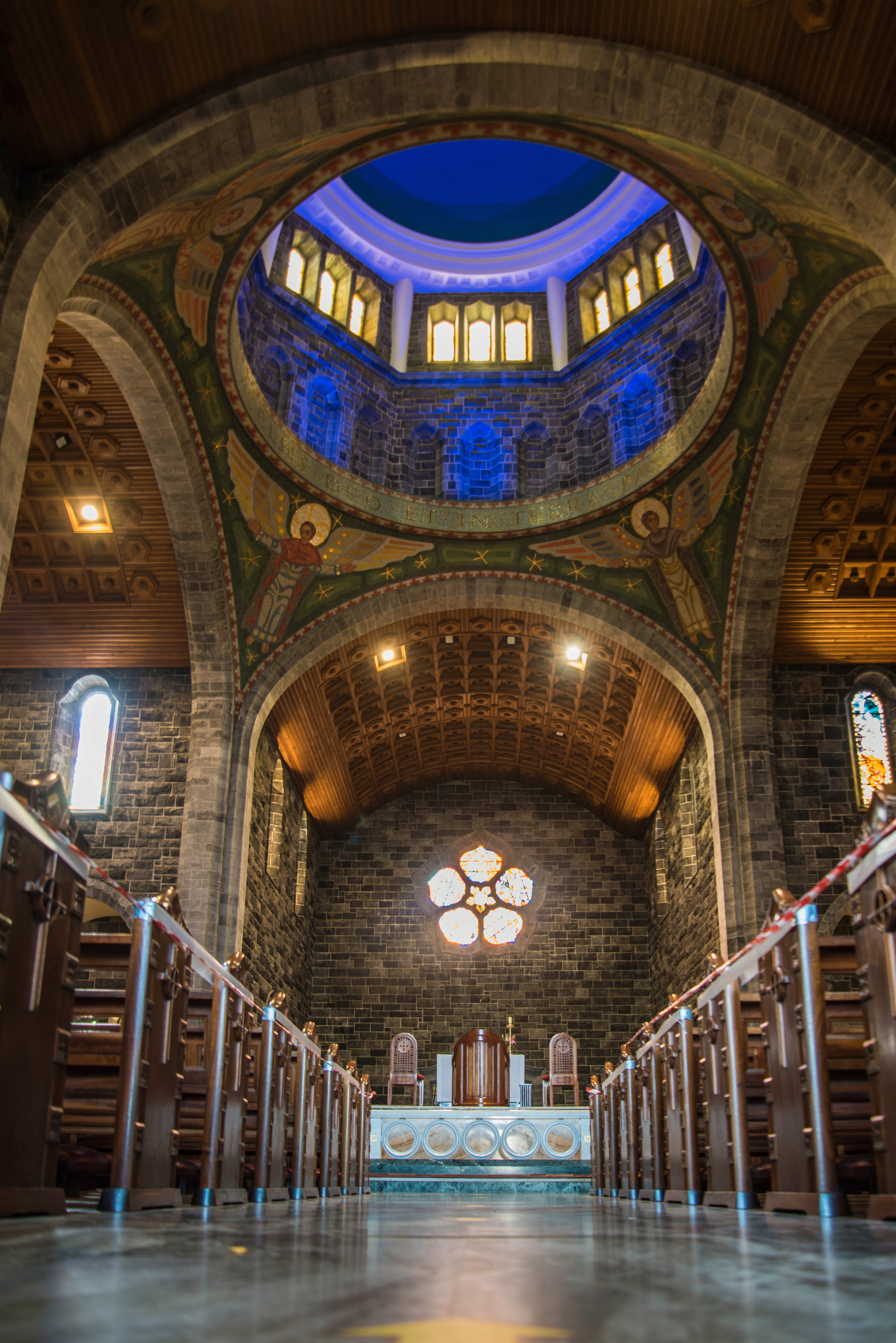
Cathedral of Our Lady Assumed into Heaven and St Nicholas, Galway

The architect of the cathedral was John J. Robinson who had previously designed many churches in Dublin and around the country. The architecture of the cathedral draws on many influences. The dome and pillars reflect a Renaissance style. Other features, including the rose windows and mosaics, echo the broad tradition of Christian art. The cathedral dome, at a height of 44.2 metres (145 ft), is a prominent landmark on the city skyline.

Constructed nearly entirely of local limestone, the cathedral is considered to be last stone public building in Ireland.

Although many were of the opinion that a 1950s style cathedral should be built, the client wanted a traditional style building. During a controversial interview on Telefís Éireann's The Late Late Show in 1966, Trinity College Dublin student Brian Trevaskis referred to the building as a "ghastly monstrosity". More recently, it was described in an Irish Times article concerning "ugly" Irish buildings as a "squatting Frankenstein's monster" and "a monument to the hubris of its soft-handed sponsors".

== Liturgy ==
Mass is celebrated every day in the cathedral. There is a Saturday evening Vigil mass at 6pm, and Sunday masses at 9am (in Gaeilge), 10:30am, 12:30pm and 6pm. On weekdays and holy days, mass is celebrated at 11am and 6pm.

== Music ==
=== Choir ===
The cathedral has been home to an adult choir since the building was dedicated, the role of which is to provide the music at all major ceremonies and services as well as at the regular Sunday 10.30 am Mass. The choir's repertoire covers music from the 16th to the 21st centuries, as well as Gregorian chant and Irish traditional music.

=== Organs ===
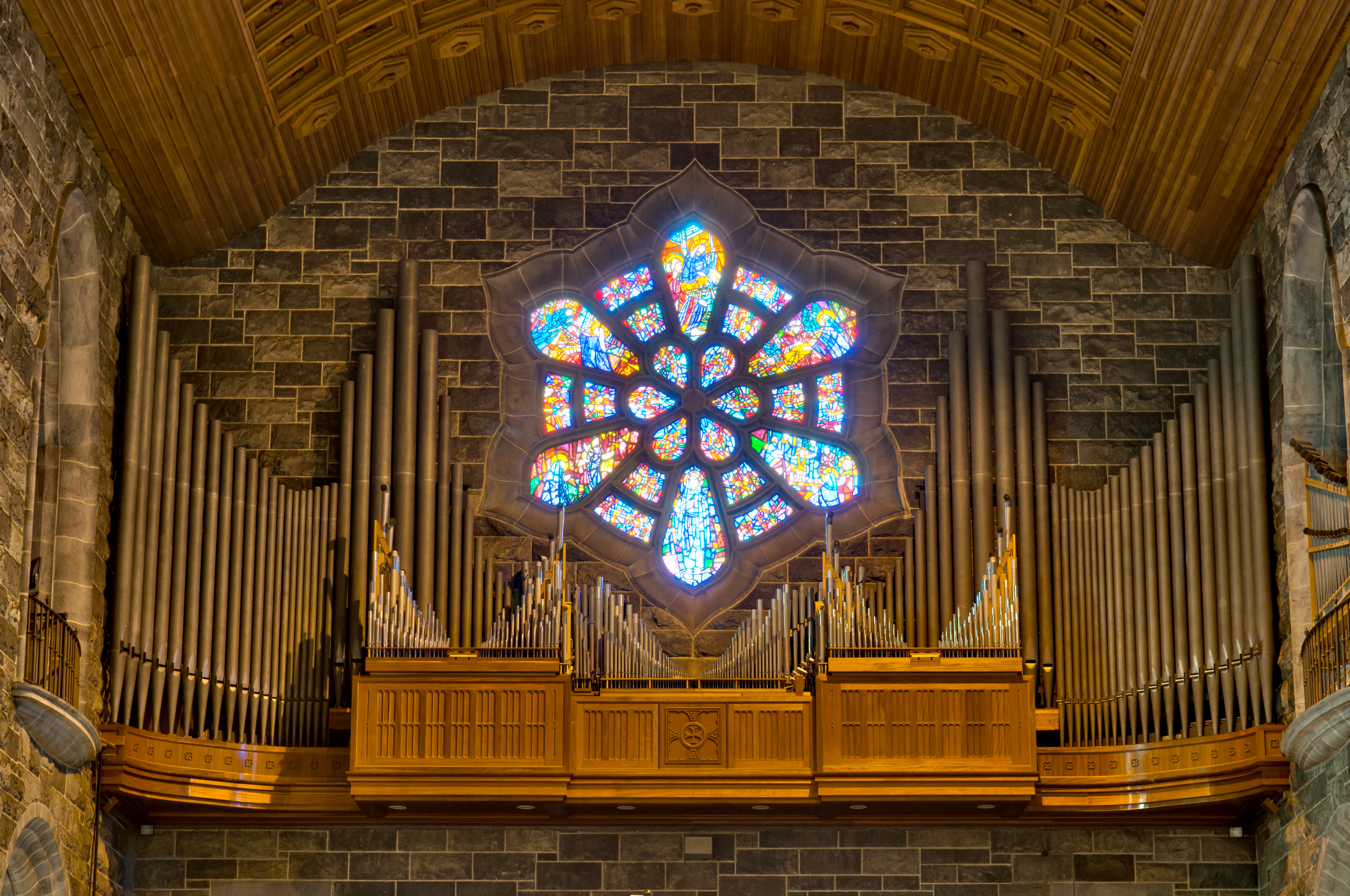
Galway Cathedral

The cathedral pipe organ was originally built by the Liverpool firm of Rushworth & Dreaper in 1966; it was renovated and greatly expanded by Irish organ-builder Trevor Crowe between 2006 and 2007. It has three manuals and 59 speaking stops, and is used regularly during services as well as in the annual series of summer concerts. The cathedral also has a smaller portable instrument, with one manual and four stops. It is used in smaller-scale liturgy in the cathedral's side chapels, as well as in a continuo role in concerts.

==== The Gallery Organ stoplist since 2007 ====
Great
Double diapason	16′
Open diapason	8′
Fugara	8′
Harmonic flute	8′
Stopped diapason	8′
Principal	4′
Spitz flute	4′
Twelfth	2 ^{2}/_{3}′
Fifteenth	2′
Flute	2′
Tierce	1 ^{3}/_{5}′
Mixture 19.22.26.29
Posaune	16′
Trumpet	8′
Clarion	4′
Tremulant
Swell to Great
Positive to Great

Positive
Principal	8′
Rohr flute	8′
Violoncello	8′
Dolce	8′
Octave	4′
Koppel flute	4′
Fifteenth	2′
Scharff 22.26.29
Posaune	8′
Cromorne	8′
Bombarde	16′
Bombarde	8′
Swell to Positive

Swell
Bourdon	16′
Open diapason	8′
Hohl flute	8′
Gemshorn	8′
Viola	8′
Viola celeste	8′
Principal	4′
Hohl flute	4′
Gemshorn	4′
Gemshorn	2′
Mixture 12.19.22
Bassoon	16′
Trumpet	8′
Oboe	8′
Vox humana	8′
Clarion	4′
Tremulant

Pedal
Subbass	32′
Open wood	16′
Open diapason	16′
Violone	16′
Subbass	16′
Octave	8′
Violoncello	8′
Bass flute	8′
Fifteenth	4′
Flute	4′
Twentysecond	2′
Mixture 12.19.26.29
Bombarde	16′
Posaune	16′
Trumpet	8′
Clarion	4′
Swell to Pedal
Positive to Pedal
Great to Pedal

Manual compass: 61 notes
Pedal compass: 32 notes
Key-action: electro-pneumatic
Stop-action: electric
16 general combinations, with 96 levels of memory
8 combinations to each division, with 16 levels of memory
Sequencer with 999 memory slots

==== The Choir Organ stoplist since 2006 ====
Stopped diapason	8′
Principal	4′
Flute	4′
Principal	2′

Manual compass: 56 notes
Key- and stop-action: mechanical

== Gallery ==
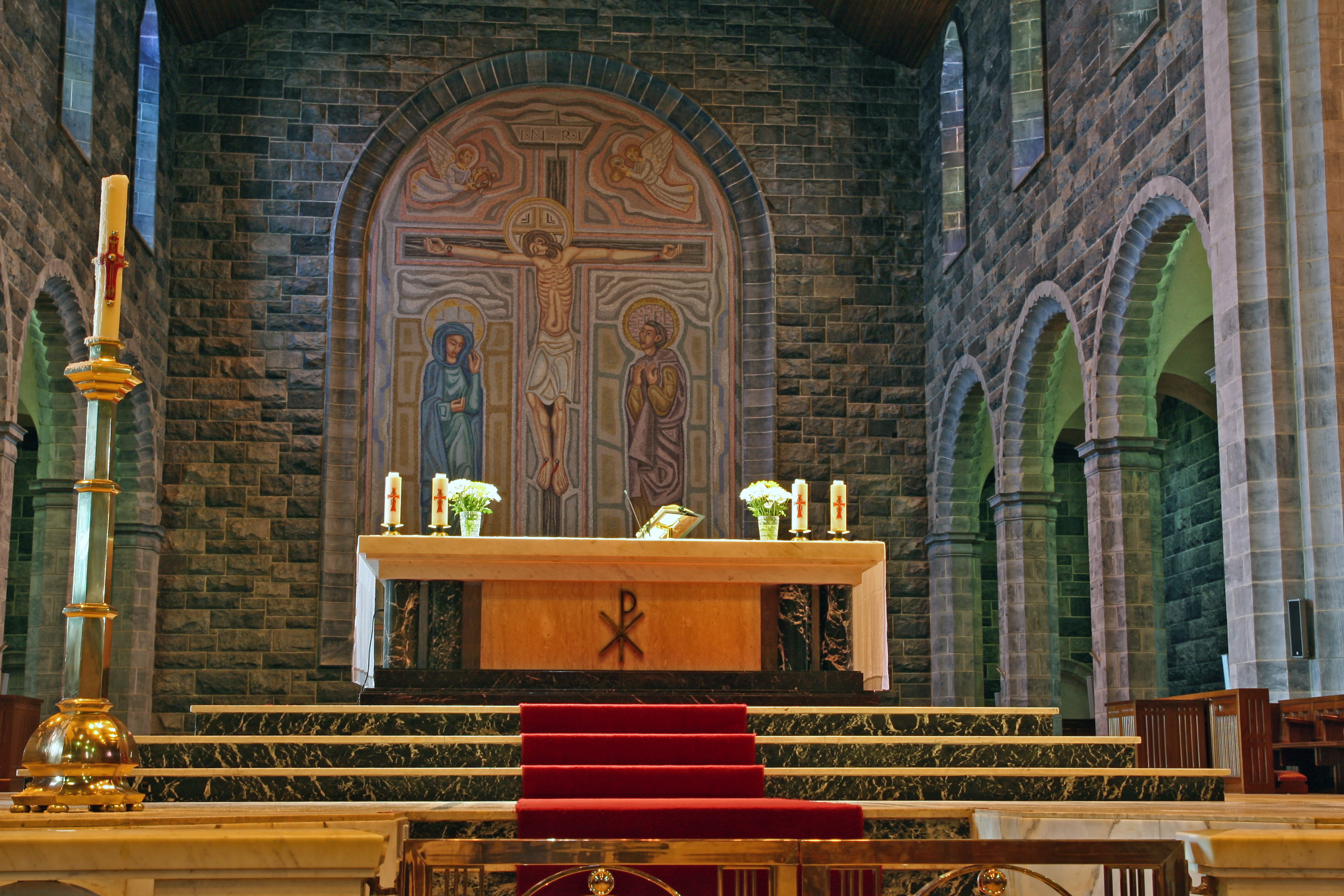
The sanctuary

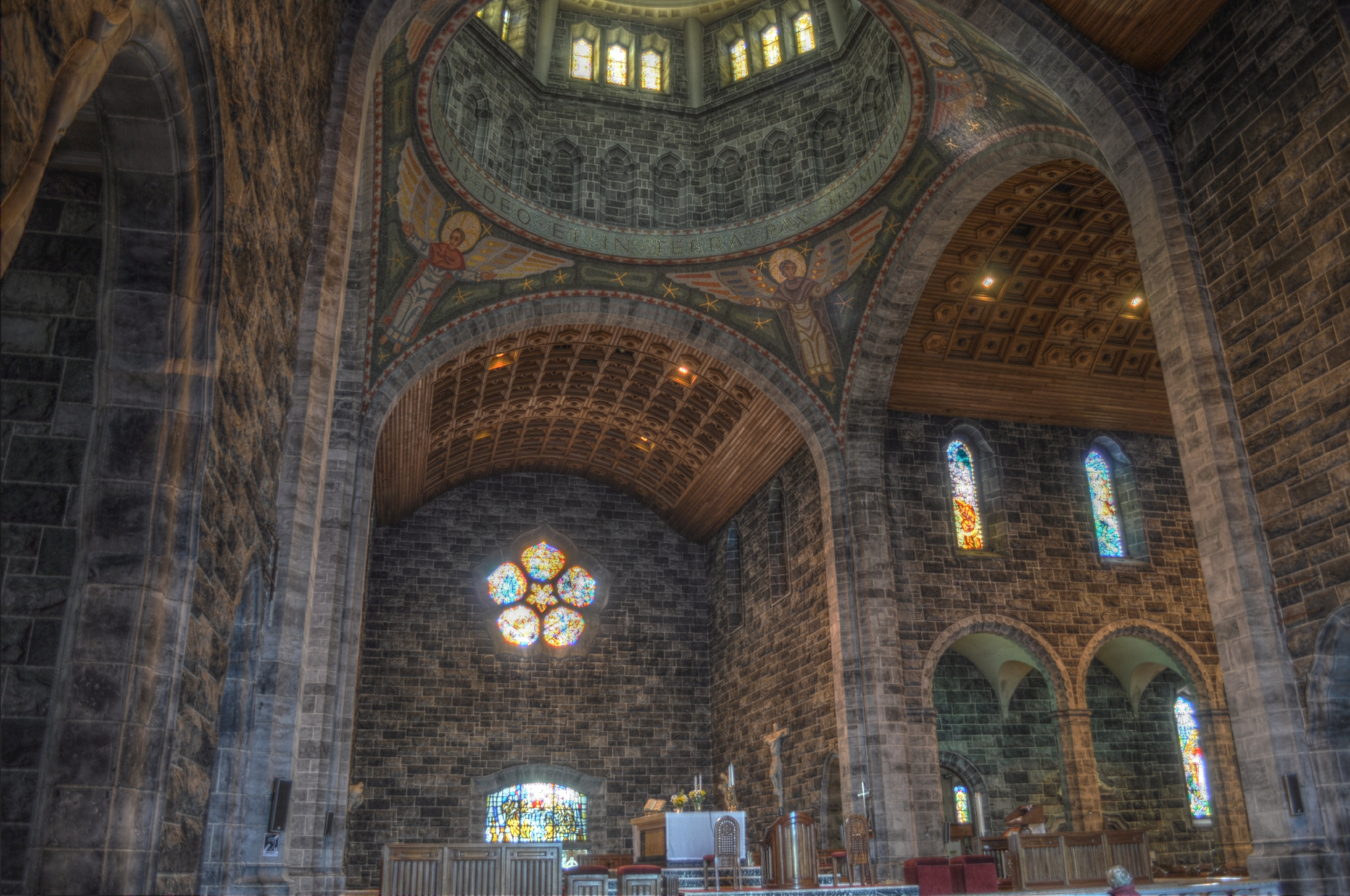
The sanctuary from transept

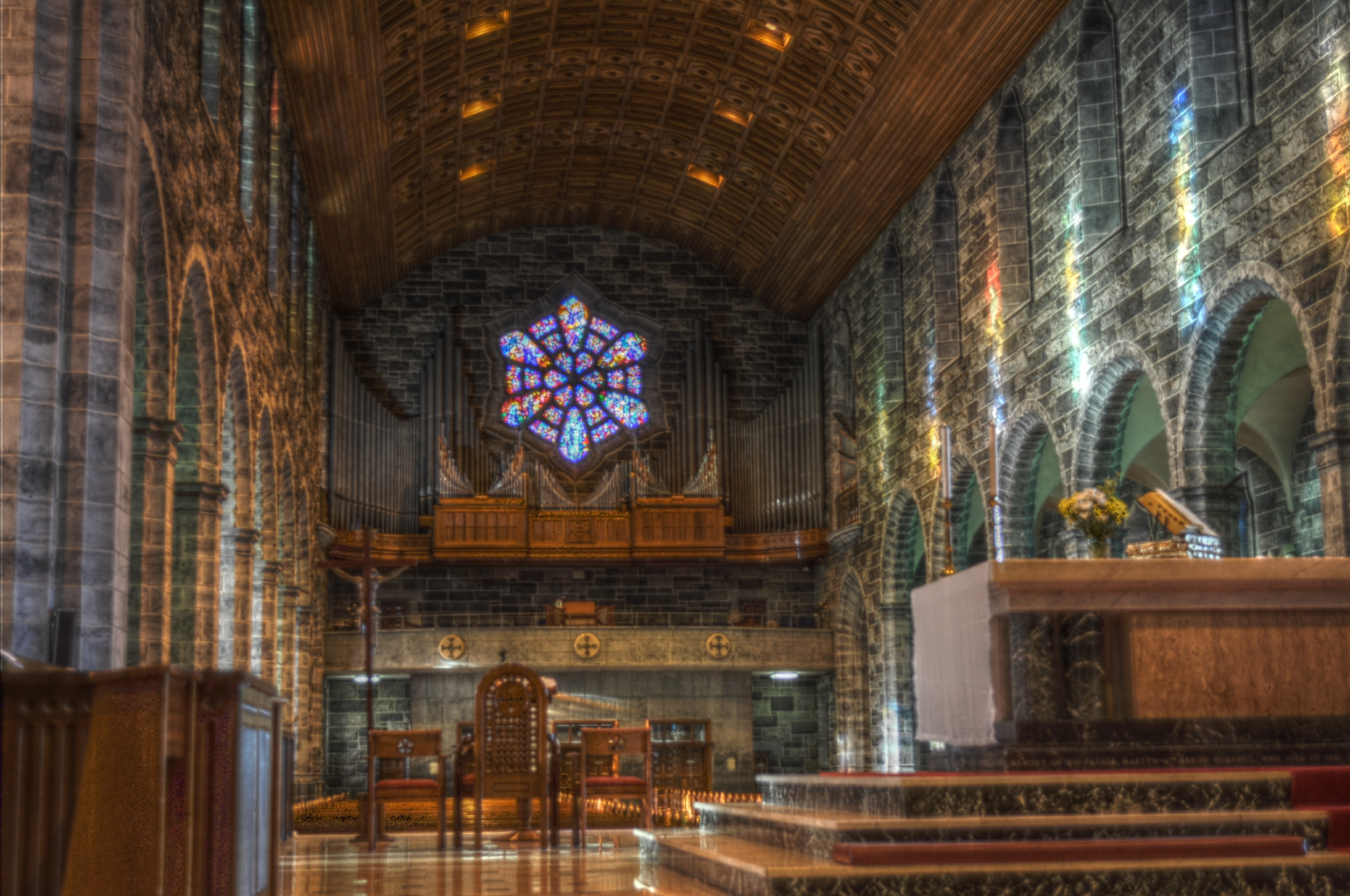
Nave from the sanctuary

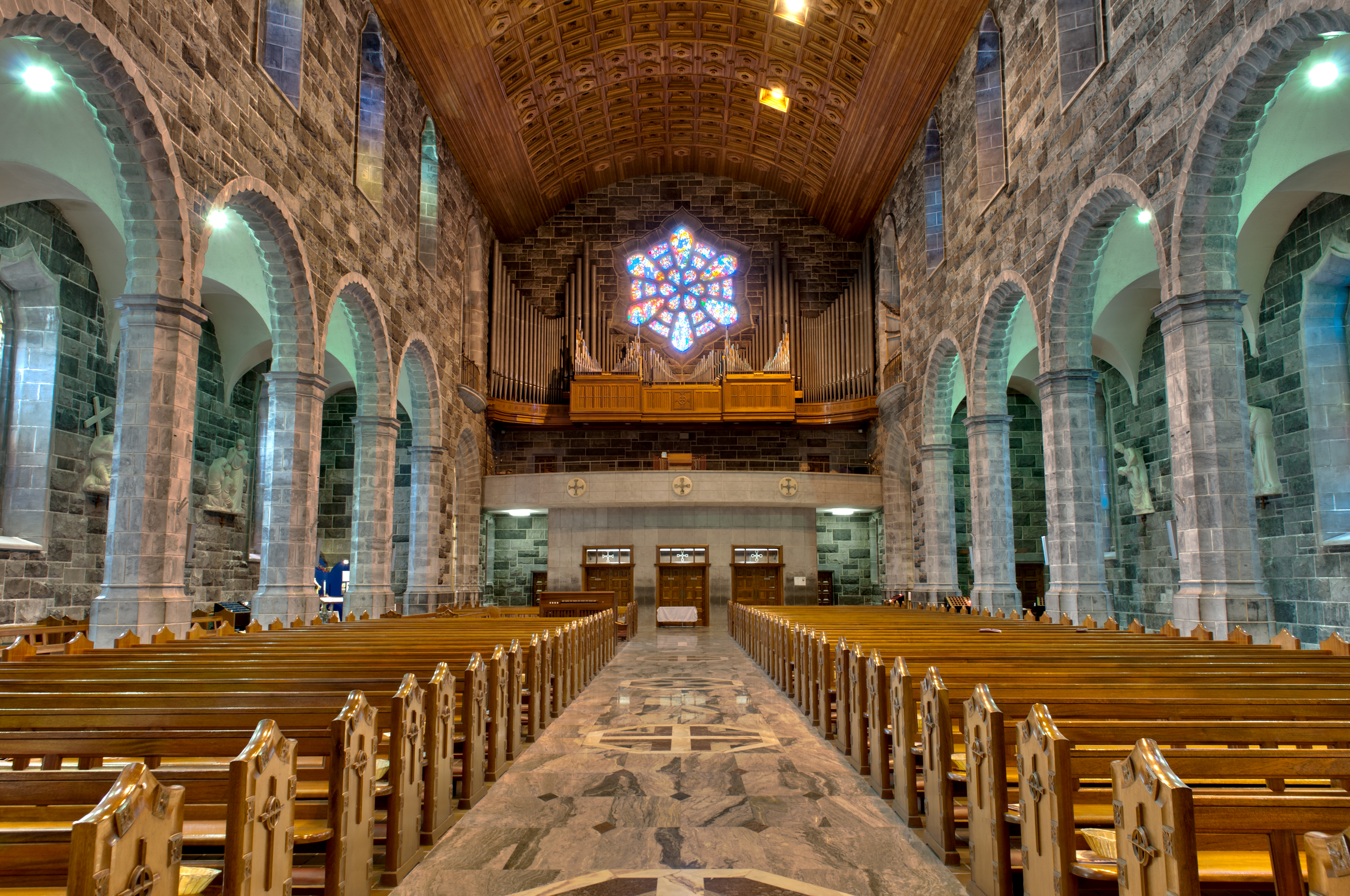
Rear nave and organ loft

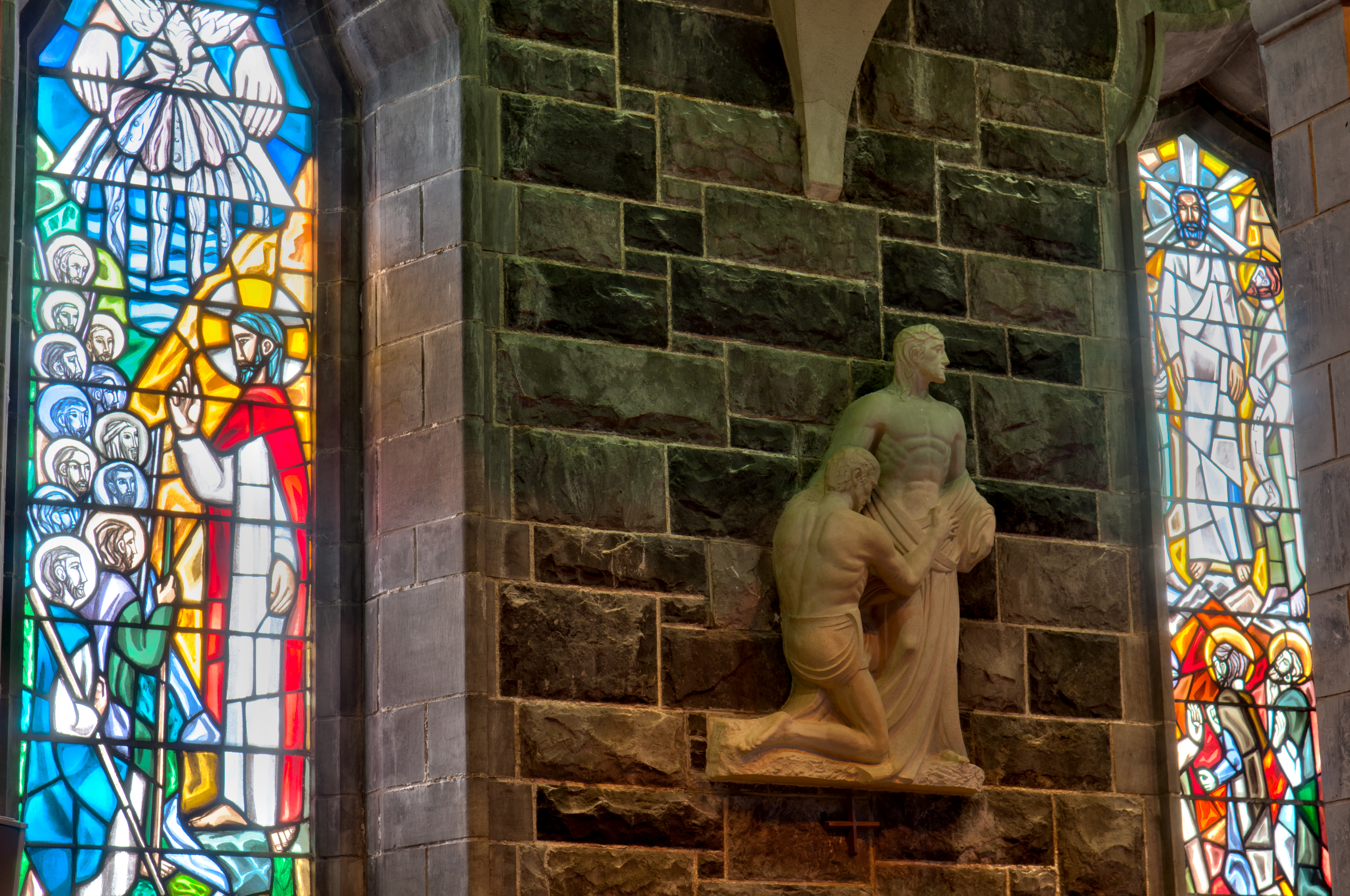
Sculpture and stained glass windows

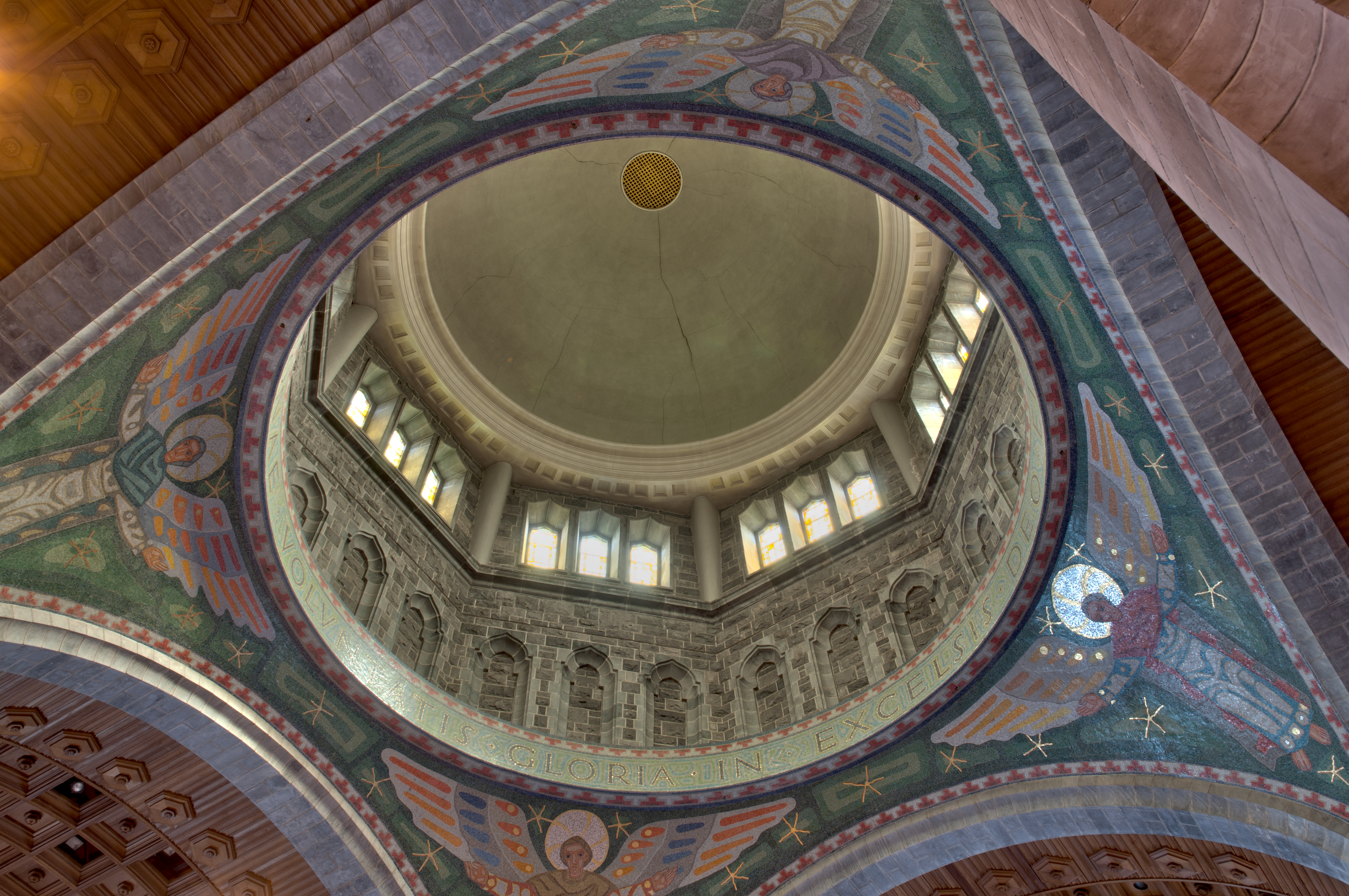
Dome and pendentives above the crossing

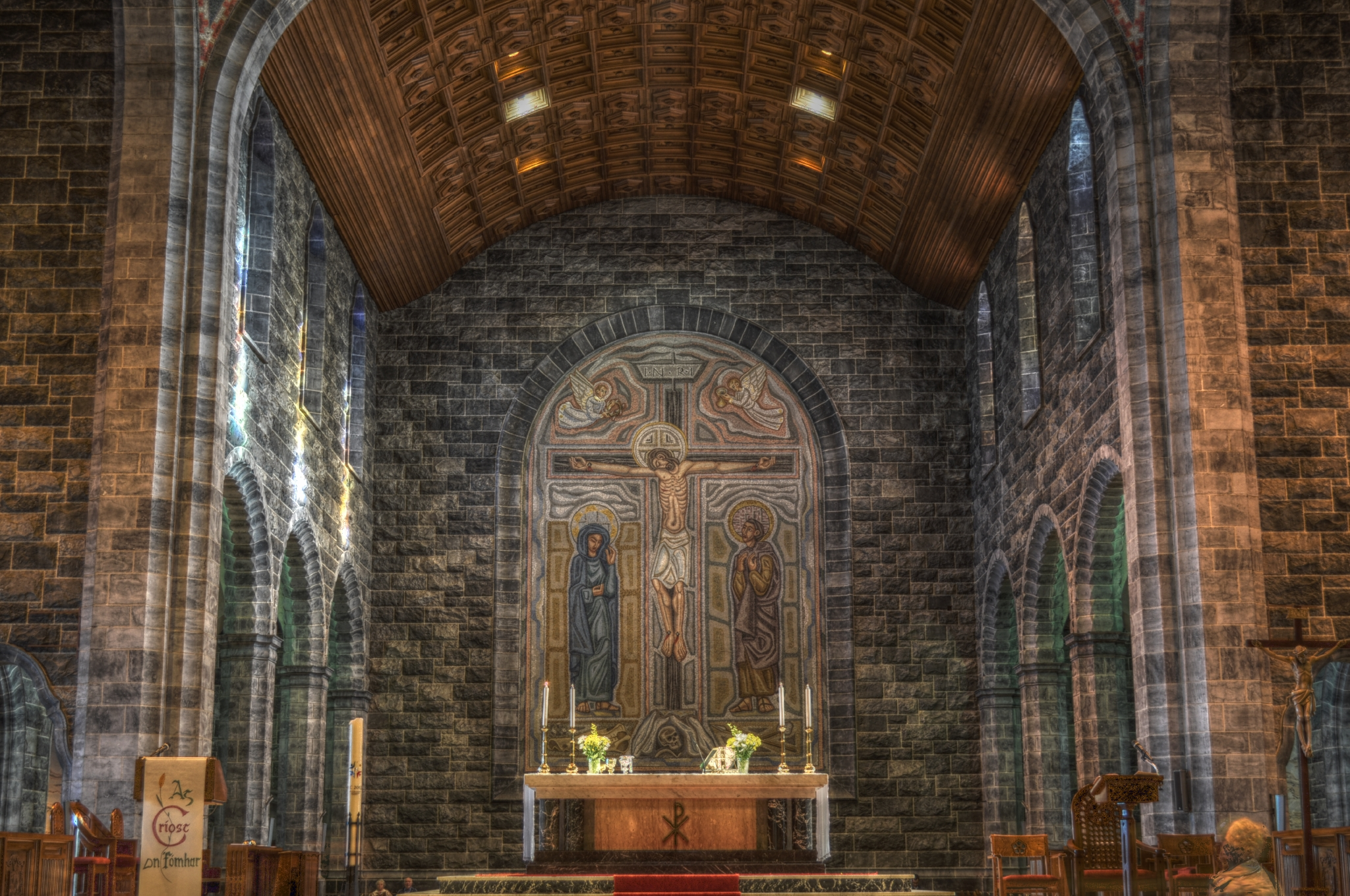
High Altar and mosaic

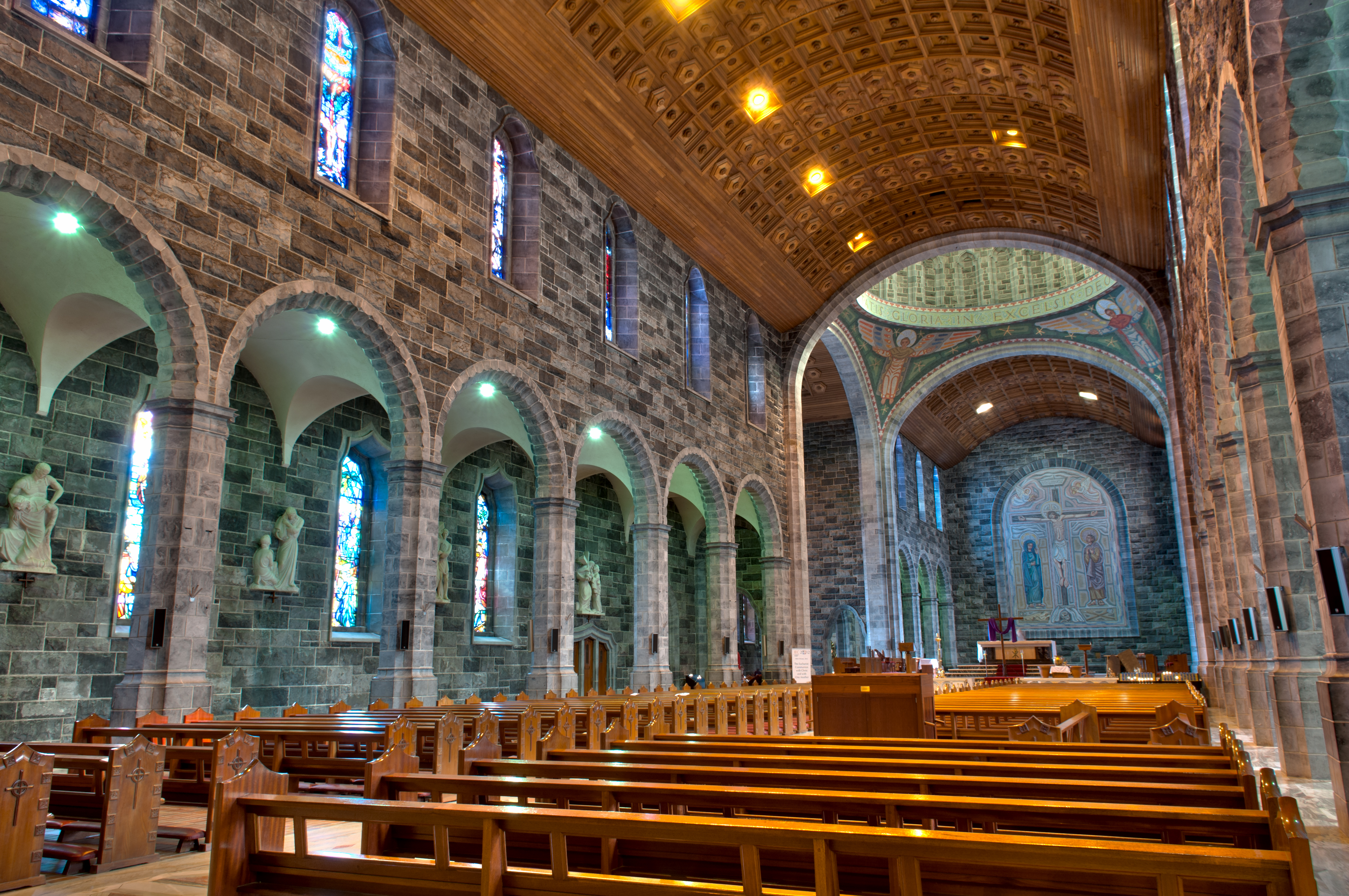
nave

== Burials ==
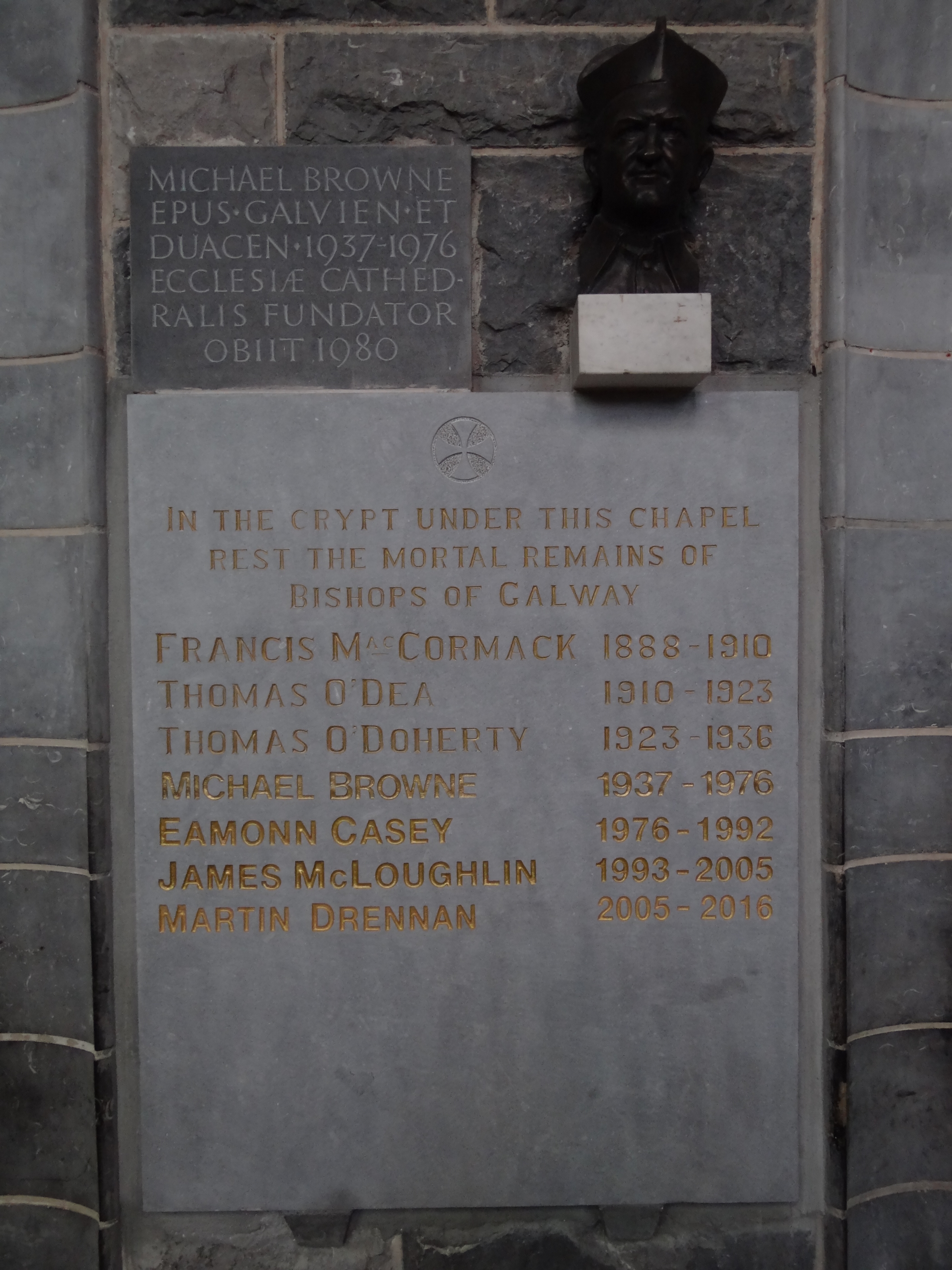
Commemorative plaque of the crypt of the Bishops of Galway.

- Francis McCormack, died in 1909, re-interred in the crypt of the new cathedral years later
- Thomas O'Dea, died in 1923, re-interred in the crypt of the new cathedral years later
- Thomas O'Doherty, died in 1936, re-interred in the crypt of the new cathedral years later
- Michael Browne, died in 1980, first bishop buried in the cathedral upon his death
- Eamonn Casey, died in 2017, disinterred in 2025
- James McLoughlin, died in 2005
- Martin Drennan, died in 2022
