= Thomas O'Dea =

Irish bishop (1858–1923)

- Bishop of Galway and Kilmacduagh
- Church: Catholic Church
- Diocese: Diocese of Galway and Kilmacduagh
- In office: 29 April 1909 – 9 April 1923
- Predecessor: Francis McCormack
- Successor: Thomas O'Doherty
- Previous post: Bishop of Clonfert (1903-1909)

Orders
- Ordination: 25 June 1882
- Consecration: 30 August 1903 by John Healy

Personal details
- Born: 7 January 1858 Carron, Kilfenora, County Clare, United Kingdom of Great Britain and Ireland
- Died: 9 April 1923 (aged 65)

Thomas O'Dea, Bishop of Clonfert and Bishop of Galway (7 January 1858 – 9 April 1923) was born in Carron, Kilfenora, County Clare, and educated in Ennis and Maynooth. He was ordained on 25 June 1882 for the Diocese of Galway. He was a member of staff at Maynooth, from the date of his ordination; and served as vice-president from 1894. He was named Bishop of Clonfert on 16 June 1903, replacing Dr. Healy. He became Bishop of Galway on 29 April 1909.

His plans to build a new cathedral for the town were interrupted by World War I. He was a fluent Irish speaker and a supporter of the GAA. He was firstly buried in St. Patrick's Pro-Cathedral of Galway, but later re-interred in the crypt of the new Cathedral of Our Lady Assumed into Heaven and St Nicholas, Galway.

== Sources ==
- Lickmolassy by the Shannon, p. 200, John Joe Conwell, 1998.
- "Galway and Kilmacduagh" . Thom's Irish Who's Who . Dublin: Alexander Thom and Son Ltd. 1923. p. 89 – via Wikisource.
