= Martin Drennan =

Roman Catholic bishop (1944–2022)

The Right Reverend Martin Drennan BA, STL, LSS
- Bishop Emeritus of Galway and Kilmacduagh and Apostolic Administrator Emeritus of Kilfenora
- Diocese: Galway, Kilmacduagh and Kilfenora
- Installed: 2005
- Term ended: 2016
- Predecessor: James McLoughlin
- Successor: Brendan Kelly
- Other posts: Auxiliary Bishop of Dublin and Titular Bishop of Aquae Regiae 1997–2005

Orders
- Ordination: 16 July 1968 (Priest)
- Consecration: 21 September 1997 (Bishop)

Personal details
- Born: Martin Drennan; 2 January 1944 Piltown, County Kilkenny, Ireland
- Died: 26 November 2022 (aged 78)
- Buried: Cathedral Crypt, Galway Cathedral
- Denomination: Roman Catholic Church

Martin Drennan (2 January 1944 – 26 November 2022) was an Irish Catholic bishop of the Diocese of Galway and Kilmacduagh and Apostolic Administrator for the Diocese of Kilfenora. Pope Francis accepted his resignation on 29 July 2016.

Drennan died on 26 November 2022, at the age of 78.

== Early life and ordination ==
Drennan was born in Piltown, County Kilkenny on 2 January 1944.

Drennan studied at Maynooth seminary, earning BA(NUI) and the Biblical Institute, Rome, and was ordained to the priesthood on 16 July 1968 for the Diocese of Ossory. Following this was two years of parish work at St Mary’s Cathedral, Kilkenny and Ballycallan parishes. He taught Scripture in St Kieran's College, Kilkenny (1973–80) before returning to study in Rome and concurrently serving as Spiritual Director at the Pontifical Irish College, Rome (1980–85). He returned to Maynooth to lecture in Sacred Scripture.

When he returned to Ireland he was appointed to the Faculty of Theology in Maynooth College (1985–97) rising to the position of Professor of Old Testament. He also taught Hebrew.

On 28 May 1997, he was appointed Auxiliary Bishop of Dublin and Titular Bishop of Aquae Regiae.

== Bishop ==
Drennan received episcopal ordination on 21 September 1997. The principal consecrator was Cardinal Desmond Connell; his co-consecrators were Archbishop Luciano Storero, the Apostolic Nuncio to Ireland, and Laurence Forristal, the Bishop of Ossory.

In May 2005 he was appointed to the Diocese of Galway in succession to Dr. James McLoughlin. He officially resigned as bishop on 29 July 2016, citing poor health.

== Abuse scandal ==
In November 2009, there were several calls for Bishop Drennan to resign from his post for his inclusion as part of the Murphy Report, surrounding a sexual abuse scandal in the Dublin archdiocese.

Bishop Drennan said that he did not feel disturbed by the Dublin diocesan report's discussion of his role. He said: "The report says nothing negative about me in fact, you know. I don’t think I have any questions to answer, in fact, from my own reflections on the time there."

The report's assessment was that the Archdiocese acted correctly in addressing the issue that relates to Dr. Drennan given the fact that the civil authorities brought no charges against the priest in question.
