= Thomas O'Doherty =

Irish Catholic bishop (1877–1936)

- Bishop of Galway and Kilmacduagh
- Church: Catholic Church
- Diocese: Diocese of Galway and Kilmacduagh
- In office: 13 July 1923 – 15 December 1936
- Predecessor: Thomas O'Dea
- Successor: Michael Browne
- Previous post: Bishop of Clonfert (1919-1923)

Orders
- Ordination: 22 June 1902
- Consecration: 14 September 1919 by Thomas Gilmartin

Personal details
- Born: 21 November 1877 Loughglinn, County Roscommon, United Kingdom of Great Britain and Ireland
- Died: 15 December 1936 (aged 59) Galway, County Galway, Irish Free State

Thomas O'Doherty (21 November 1877 – 15 December 1936) was Bishop of Clonfert and Bishop of Galway successively from November 1919 to July 1936.

== Early life and education ==
O'Doherty was born at Loughglynn, Ballaghaderreen, County Roscommon, on 21 November 1877 and educated in Sligo and Maynooth.

He was ordained priest on 22 June 1902 for service in the Diocese of Elphin, and his first pastoral appointment was to the staff of Summerhill College, Sligo, from 1902 to 1910. He was then appointed to the staff of Maynooth College, where he served as a dean for nearly a decade before he was appointed Bishop of Clonfert on 3 July 1919.

== Episcopal ministry ==
=== Clonfert ===
He served in the East Galway diocese for three years before he was moved to the larger diocese of Galway. These early years as a bishop coincided with the turbulent events of the Anglo-Irish war and the Civil War. O'Doherty has been assessed by historians as pro-Treaty bishop but more measured in his tone than his episcopal colleagues in other parts of Galway.

=== Galway ===
In July 1923 he was moved to Galway succeeding the man he had succeeded as bishop in Clonfert, Thomas O'Dea. He is remembered as a "disciplinarian" which would be consistent with his previous posting in Maynooth responsible for the formation of students.

In July 1935, along with many other Irish bishops he opined on the evils of the dance-halls which were "practically on all occasions dangerous to morals." He used the same occasion to denounce "the evils of mixed bathing."

He died at his residence aged 59 in Galway on 15 December 1936.
