= John McEvilly =

Irish Archbishop

- Archbishop of Tuam
- Church: Catholic Church
- Archdiocese: Archdiocese of Tuam
- In office: 7 November 1881 – 26 November 1902
- Predecessor: John MacHale
- Successor: John Healy
- Previous posts: Coadjutor Archbishop of Tuam (1878-1881); Apostolic Administrator of Kilmachduagh and Kilfenora (1866-1881); Bishop of Galway (1857-1881)

Orders
- Ordination: 25 July 1840
- Consecration: 22 March 1857 by John MacHale

Personal details
- Born: 15 April 1818 Louisburgh, County Mayo, United Kingdom of Great Britain and Ireland
- Died: 26 November 1902 (aged 84)

Styles of John McEvilly
- Reference style: The Most Reverend
- Spoken style: Your Grace or Archbishop

John McEvilly (1818–1902) was an Irish Roman Catholic clergyman who served as the Archbishop of Tuam from 1881 to 1902.

He was born on 15 April 1818 in Louisburgh, a small town near Westport, County Mayo, Ireland. He entered the Seminary of Tuam in January 1833, then was sent to Maynooth College in September 1833, where among his contemporaries was the future Archbishop of Armagh Joseph Dixon. In 1842, McEvilly was ordained a priest of the Archdiocese of Tuam.

On 9 January 1857, he was appointed the Bishop of Galway by the Holy See and was consecrated on 22 March 1857 by the Most Reverend John MacHale, Archbishop of Tuam. While as Bishop of Galway, McEvilly was appointed the Apostolic Administrator of Kilmacduagh and Kilfenora in September 1866 and appointed Coadjutor Archbishop of Tuam on 11 January 1878. On the death of Archbishop MacHale, he succeeded as the Metropolitan Archbishop of Tuam on 7 November 1881.

He was instrumental in setting up St Joseph's Industrial School, Letterfrack, and he produced a number of well respected Bible commentaries.

Archbishop McEvilly died in office on 26 November 1902, aged 84.

== Bibliography ==
- Brady, W. Maziere (1876). The Episcopal Succession in England, Scotland and Ireland, A.D. 1400 to 1875. Vol. 2. Rome: Tipografia Della Pace.
- Fryde, E. B.; Greenway, D. E.; Porter, S.; Roy, I., eds. (1986). Handbook of British Chronology (3rd, reprinted 2003 ed.). Cambridge: Cambridge University Press. ISBN 0-521-56350-X.
- MacEvilly, John (1879). An Exposition of the Gospel of St. John consisting of an analysis of each chapter and of a Commentary critical, exegetical, doctrinal and moral. Dublin Gill & Son.

Catholic Church titles
Preceded by Laurence O'Donnell	Bishop of Galway; 1857–1881	Became part of the united Diocese of Galway, Kilmacduagh and Kilfenora in 1883
Preceded by Patrick Fallon (bishop)	Apostolic Administrator of Kilmacduagh and Kilfenora; 1866–1883	Became part of the united Diocese of Galway, Kilmacduagh and Kilfenora in 1883
Preceded by John MacHale	Archbishop of Tuam; 1881–1902	Succeeded by John Healy
