= Laurence O'Donnell =

Roman Catholic Bishop of Galway

- Bishop of Galway
- Church: Catholic Church
- Diocese: Diocese of Galway
- In office: 27 September 1844 – 29 June 1855
- Predecessor: George Joseph Plunket Browne
- Successor: John McEvilly

Orders
- Consecration: 28 October 1845 by John MacHale

Personal details
- Born: 1777 Oldchapel, Oughterard, County Galway, Kingdom of Ireland, British Empire
- Died: 29 June 1855 (aged 77–78)

Laurence O'Donnell DD (1777 – 29 June 1855) was a Roman Catholic Bishop of Galway, starting in 1844; he was appointed September 26, and consecrated October 28.

Born in Oldchapel, Oughterard, Co. Galway, Laurence entered St. Patrick's College, Maynooth in 1800 to train for the priesthood.

Prior to his appointment as Bishop, Fr. O'Donnell served as chaplain to Galway Gaol, and he witnessed many executions. He was also served as parish priest of St. Nicholas West (The Claddagh), Galway. Dr. O'Donnell also served as Vicar General for the Diocese.

He tutored his Nephew Dominic Bodkin, the son of his sister Eleanor, who went on to be a Physician in America. His residence, Fort Lorenzo, Taylors Hill, Galway, was purchased by Mrs Kirwan his sister for him.

Bishop Galway died on 29 June 1855, and was buried in his former parish of The Claddagh in the Dominican Fathers’ Burial Ground, in Galway. A monument was erected in his memory by his sister Mrs. Catherine Hickey.

Bishop O'Donnell was seen as being ineffectual by Cardinal Cullen, in not counteracting the proselytizing by Protestants in the west of Ireland during the famine, also in the lack of Catholic influence (and inability to award degrees in theology) in the establishment of the Queen's Colleges. Bishop O'Donnell was supportive of the Queens College which was established in Galway.

An oil painting portrait of Dr. O'Donnell by the artist Fr. John Rooney, hung in the Bishops Residence in Taylors Hill. Bishop O'Donnell Road, in Galway is named after him.
