= Roman Catholic Diocese of Galway, Kilmacduagh and Kilfenora =

Catholic diocese in Ireland

Coordinates: 53.2752°N 9.0575°W

Diocese of Galway and Kilmacduagh Dioecesis Galviensis, Duacensis et Finaborensis Deoise na Gaillimhe, Chill Mhic Duaich agus Chill Fhionnúrach

Catholic
- Cathedral of Our Lady Assumed into Heaven and St Nicholas

Location
- Country: Ireland
- Territory: Parts of counties Mayo, Galway and Clare
- Ecclesiastical province: Province of Tuam
- Metropolitan: Archdiocese of Tuam

Statistics
- Area: 1,008 sq mi (2,610 km^{2})
- Population: 105,707

Information
- Denomination: Catholic
- Sui iuris church: Latin Church
- Rite: Roman Rite
- Established: United 5 June 1883
- Cathedral: Cathedral of Our Lady Assumed into Heaven and St Nicholas, Galway
- Patron saint: Galway: Our Lady Assumed into Heaven Saint Nicholas; Kilmacduagh: St Colman; Kilfenora: St Fachanan

Current leadership
- Pope: Leo XIV
- Bishop: Michael Duignan
- Metropolitan Archbishop: Francis Duffy
- Bishops emeritus: Brendan Kelly

Map
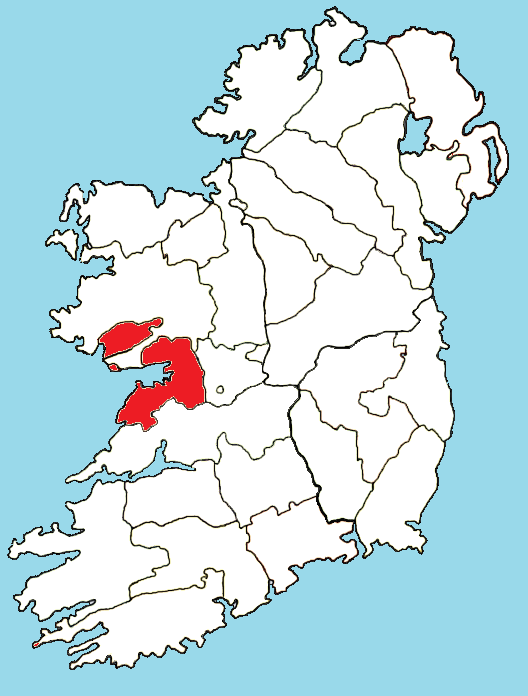

Website
- galwaydiocese.ie

The Diocese of Galway, Kilmacduagh and Kilfenora (Irish: Deoise na Gaillimhe, Chill Mhic Duaich agus Chill Fhionnúrach) is a Latin Church diocese of the Catholic Church in the west of Ireland. It is in the ecclesiastical province of Tuam and is subject to the Metropolitan Archdiocese of Tuam. The deanery of Kilfenora, previously a diocese in its own right, lies in the ecclesiastical province of Cashel. The ordinary is Bishop Michael Duignan who was appointed on 11 February 2022.

== Geographic remit ==
The geographic remit of the see includes the City of Galway, parts of the county of Galway and the northern coastal part of County Clare. Large population centres include Ennistymon, Oranmore and Oughterard. The cathedral church of the diocese is the Cathedral of Our Lady Assumed into Heaven and St Nicholas.

== Ecclesiastical history ==
The diocese has its origins in the ancient monastery of Kilmacduagh and the Wardenship of Galway (1484–1831). Following the abolition of the Wardenship (see Edmund Ffrench) by the Holy See in 1831, the first Bishop of the new Diocese of Galway was appointed in the same year.

In 1866, Bishop John McEvilly of Galway was made Apostolic Administrator of the diocese of Kilmacduagh and Kilfenora. When he was appointed coadjutor to the Archdiocese of Tuam in 1878, he retained Galway until he succeeded as archbishop in 1881. McEvilly continued to oversee Kilmacduagh and Kilfenora until 1883 when Pope Leo XIII united the diocese with the neighbouring Diocese of Kilmacduagh. At the same time, the ordinary of the United Diocese of Galway and Kilmacduagh was appointed, in perpetuum, as the Apostolic Administrator of the Diocese of Kilfenora.

The bishopric of Kilmacduagh had been a separate title until 1750 when Pope Benedict XIV decreed that it to be united with the bishopric of Kilfenora. Since Kilmacduagh was in the ecclesiastical province of Tuam while Kilfenora was in the Province of Cashel, it was arranged that the ordinary of the united dioceses was to be alternately bishop of one diocese and apostolic administrator of the other. The first holder of this unusual arrangement was Peter Kilkelly, who had been Bishop of Kilmacduagh since 1744, became Apostolic Administrator of Kilfenora in September 1750. Since that date, Kilfenora has been administered by that united diocese as an Apostolic Vicariate. Since the territory of an Apostolic Vicariate comes directly under the pope as "universal bishop", the pope exercises his authority in Kilfenora through a "vicar".

In 2021 the Holy See announced that the Diocese of Galway, Kilmacduagh and Kilfenora would soon have the same bishop as the Roman Catholic Diocese of Clonfert. This was accomplished on 11 February 2022 with the appointment of Michael Duignan, Bishop of Clonfert, to the Diocese of Galway as well.

== Deaneries and parishes ==
The united diocese is divided into five deaneries for which a Vicar Forane (VF) is appointed by the bishop. The VF exercises limited jurisdiction in the deanery on behalf of the bishop. The deaneries are divided further into parishes or group parishes.

- Deanery of Galway City East – Parishes: Ballybane · Ballinfoyle · Cathedral · Good Shepherd · Mervue · Renmore · Saint Augustine · Saint Francis · Saint Patrick.
- Deanery of Galway City West – Parishes: Knocknacarra · Sacred Heart · Salthill · Saint Joseph · Saint Mary, Claddagh.
- Deanery of Galway Rural – Parishes: An Spidéal · Barna · Castlegar · Killanin · Leitirmóir · Moycullen · Oranmore · Oughterard · Rosmuc · Shrule.
- Deanery of Kilmacduagh – Parishes: Ardrahan · Ballinderreen · Clarinbridge · Craughwell · Gort & Beagh · Kilbeacanty & Peterswell · Kilchreest & Castledaly · Kinvara.
- Deanery of Kilfenora – Parishes: Ballyvaughan · Carron & New Quay · Ennistymon · Kilfenora · Liscannor & Moymore · Lisdoonvarna & Kilshanny.

== List of Bishops ==
=== Bishops of Galway ===
From	Until	Incumbent	Notes
1831		(Nicholas Foran)	Appointed 16 April 1831, but did not take effect due to illness; later became Bishop of Waterford and Lismore in 1837
1831	1844	George Joseph Plunket Browne	Appointed 6 August and consecrated 23 October 1831; translated to Elphin 26 March 1844
1844	1855	Laurence O'Donnell	Appointed 26 September and consecrated 28 October 1844; died 29 June 1855
1857	1881	John McEvilly	Appointed 24 December 1856 and consecrated 22 March 1857; also was appointed Apostolic Administrator of Kilmacduagh & Kilfenora (1866–1883) and Coadjutor archbishop of Tuam (1878–1881); relinquished Galway when he succeeded as Archbishop of Tuam on 7 November 1881
1881	1883	Sede vacante	

=== Bishops of Galway and Kilmacduagh ===
and Apostolic Administrators of Kilfenora

From	Until	Incumbent	Notes
1883	1886	Thomas Joseph Carr	Appointed 12 June and consecrated 26 August 1883; translated to Melbourne 29 September 1886
1887	1908	Francis McCormack	Translated from Achonry; appointed 27 April 1887; retired 21 October 1908; died 14 November 1909
1909	1923	Thomas O'Dea	Translated from Clonfert; appointed 29 April 1909; died 9 April 1923
1923	1936	Thomas O'Doherty	Translated from Clonfert; appointed 13 July 1923; died 15 December 1936
1937	1976	Michael Browne	Appointed 6 August and consecrated 10 November 1937; retired 21 July 1976; died 24 February 1980
1976	1992	Eamonn Casey	Translated from Kerry; appointed 21 July 1976; resigned 6 May 1992; died 13 March 2017
1993	2005	James McLoughlin	Appointed 10 February and consecrated 28 March 1993; retired 23 May 2005; died 25 November 2005
2005	2016	Martin Drennan	Previously Auxiliary Bishop of Dublin; consecrated 21 September 1997; appointed Bishop of Galway and Kilmacduagh 23 May 2005; resigned 29 July 2016; died 26 November 2022
2017	2022	Brendan Kelly	Translated from Achonry; appointed 11 December 2017 and consecrated 11 February 2018; retired 11 February 2022
2022	present	Michael Duignan	Also Bishop of Clonfert; appointed 11 February 2022

== See also ==
- Catholic Church in Ireland
