= Bishop of Kilmacduagh and Kilfenora =

The Bishop and Apostolic Administrator of Kilmacduagh and Kilfenora was an episcopal title which took its name after the small villages of Kilmacduagh in County Galway and Kilfenora in County Clare, in the west of Ireland. Accurately, the title was an alternative sequence of the Bishop of Kilmacduagh and Administrator Apostolic of Kilfenora followed by the next holder as the Bishop of Kilfenora and Administrator Apostolic of Kilmacduagh.

== History ==
It was decreed by Pope Benedict XIV in 1750 that the Episcopal sees of Kilmacduagh and Kilfenora were to be united. The bishop of the united dioceses was to be alternately bishop of one diocese and apostolic administrator of the other, since the two dioceses were in different ecclesiastical provinces. The first bishop under this new arrangement was Peter Kilkelly, who had been Bishop of Kilmacduagh since 1744, became Apostolic Administrator of Kilfenora in September 1750.

Following the resignation of Bishop Patrick Fallon in 1866, John MacEvilly, Bishop of Galway (later Archbishop of Tuam), was appointed Apostolic Administrator of both the dioceses of Kilmacduagh and Kilfenora. In 1883, the see of Kilmacduagh was united with Galway, and the bishops of the united see were also made permanently apostolic administrators of Kilfenora.

== List of bishops and apostolic administrators ==
Bishops and Apostolic Administrators of Kilmacduagh and Kilfenora
From	Until	Incumbent	Notes
1750	1783	Peter Kilkelly	Appointed Bishop of Kilmacduagh on 22 June and consecrated 14 October 1744; he also was appointed Apostolic Administrator of Kilfenora when the two dioceses united in September 1750; died 29 May 1783
1783	1795	Laurence Nihil	Appointed 23 December 1783; died 29 June 1795
1795	1798	Edward Dillon	Appointed coadjutor bishop (with succession) 21 January 1794; succeeded 29 June 1795; translated to Tuam 19 November 1798
1798	1799	(Richard Luke Concanen, O.P.)	Appointed 19 November 1798, but was not consecrated; resigned before 11 December 1799; later he was appointed the first Bishop of New York on 8 April 1808, but died in Naples on 19 June 1810 while waiting to sail to New York
1800	1823	Nicholas Archdeacon	Appointed 12 October 1800; died 27 November 1823
1824	1852	Edmund Ffrench	Appointed 24 August 1824 and consecrated 13 March 1825; also was the last Warden of Galway (1812–1831); died 20 July 1852
1853	1866	Patrick Fallon	Appointed 26 January 1853; resigned due to ill health 31 August 1866 and entered the Passionist order; died at Mount Argus, Dublin on 13 May 1879
1866	1883	John McEvilly	Appointed Apostolic Administrator of Kilmacduagh & Kilfenora in 1866 and relinquished the post in 1883; also was Bishop of Galway (1857–1881), coadjutor archbishop of Tuam (1878–1881) and Archbishop of Tuam (1881–1902)
Since 1883, Kilmacduagh and Kilfenora have been part of the united diocese of Diocese of Galway, Kilmacduagh and Kilfenora
