= Dominic Joseph Conway =

Irish Roman Catholic bishop

- Bishop of Elphin
- Church: Catholic Church
- Diocese: Diocese of Elphin
- In office: 12 March 1971 – 24 May 1994
- Predecessor: Vincent Hanly
- Successor: Christopher Jones
- Previous posts: Titular Bishop of Ros Cré (1970-1971); Auxiliary Bishop of Elphin (1970-1971)

Orders
- Ordination: 9 November 1941
- Consecration: 8 November 1970 by Carlo Confalonieri

Personal details
- Born: 1 January 1918 Longford, County Longford, United Kingdom of Great Britain and Ireland
- Died: 22 August 1996 (aged 78)

Dominic Joseph Conway (1 January 1918 – 22 August 1996) was an Irish Roman Catholic clergyman who served as Bishop of Elphin from 1971 to 1994.

Conway was born in Longford and educated at Summerhill College, Sligo, the Pontifical Lateran University, the Pontifical Gregorian University and University College Dublin. He was ordained in 1941.

After postgraduate studies he spent five years in Africa with the Kiltegan Fathers from 1943–48.

Conway served as spiritual director at the Pontifical Irish College, Rome from 1951 and in 1965 became rector of the college where he served a three-year term.

In 1970 he was nominated as an Auxiliary Bishop of Elphin and was appointed as titular Bishop of Roscre, reviving an ancient Irish title that had not been deployed since the 12th century.

In 1976 he returned to Rome to ordain the diaconate class at the Pontifical Irish College, where he ordained the current bishop of Elphin, Kevin Doran.

Having worked in Africa as a young priest he was always sensitive to the needs of the wider church and pastoral needs of those abroad; he persuaded individuals and public authorities in his diocese to "take in" migrants from Vietnam and Cambodia in the 70's and 80's

Catholic Church titles
Preceded by Vincent Hanly	Bishop of Elphin; 1971–1996	Succeeded by Christopher Jones (bishop)
