= Vincent Hanly =

Irish Roman Catholic clergyman

Vincent Hanley
- Bishop of Elphin
- Church: Catholic Church
- Diocese: Diocese of Elphin
- In office: 19 July 1950 – 9 November 1970
- Predecessor: Edward Doorly
- Successor: Dominic Joseph Conway

Orders
- Ordination: 17 June 1923
- Consecration: 24 September 1950 by Joseph Walsh

Personal details
- Born: 22 April 1899 Ardnagowna, Elphin, County Roscommon, United Kingdom of Great Britain and Ireland
- Died: 9 November 1970 (aged 71)

Vincent Hanly (22 April 1899 – 9 November 1970) was an Irish Roman Catholic clergyman who served as the Bishop of Elphin from 1950 to 1970.

He studied for the priesthood at Maynooth College and was ordained a priest for service in the Diocese of Elphin on 17 June 1923 and continued his studies at the college for two further years to gain an STL. In 1925 joined the teaching staff of Summerhill College but very soon was appointed to Sligo parish as a curate and secretary to his predecessor Bishop Doorly. In 1930 he returned to Summerhill College as Professor of Mathematics and Latin.

He became vice-president of the college in 1939 and Chancellor of the diocese, transferring five years later to serve as Administrator of Sligo Cathedral. He was responsible for the introduction of the Legion of Mary into Sligo.

He attended all four sessions of the Second Vatican Council

He is one of the founders of St. Aloysius College.

Catholic Church titles
Preceded by Edward Doorly	Bishop of Elphin; 1950–1970	Succeeded by Dominic Joseph Conway
