= Bernard Coyne (bishop) =

Irish Roman Catholic clergyman

- Bishop of Elphin
- Church: Catholic Church
- Diocese: Diocese of Elphin
- In office: 18 January 1913 – 17 July 1926
- Predecessor: John Joseph Clancy
- Successor: Edward Doorly

Orders
- Ordination: 1879
- Consecration: 30 March 1913 by John Healy

Personal details
- Born: 1854 Sandfield House, County Roscommon, United Kingdom of Great Britain and Ireland
- Died: 26 July 1926 (aged 71–72)

Bernard Coyne (1854–17 July 1926) was an Irish Roman Catholic clergyman who served as the Bishop of Elphin from 1913 to 1926, being consecrated 30 March 1913.

Coyne was born at Sandfield House, Roscommon, in 1854, and started his education at Summerhill College, then later studied for the priesthood at Maynooth College where he was a classmate of the future Cardinal O'Donnell.

Catholic Church titles
| Preceded by John Joseph Clancy (bishop) | Bishop of Elphin; 1913–1926 | Succeeded by Edward Doorly |
