= John Joseph Clancy (bishop) =

Irish Roman Catholic clergyman

- Bishop of Elphin
- Church: Catholic Church
- Diocese: Diocese of Elphin
- In office: 8 February 1895 – 19 October 1912
- Predecessor: Laurence Gillooly
- Successor: Bernard Coyne
- Previous posts: Titular Bishop of Achantus (1895); Coadjutor Bishop of Elphin (1895)

Orders
- Ordination: 25 June 1882
- Consecration: 24 March 1895 by John McEvilly

Personal details
- Born: 23 December 1856 Sooey, County Sligo, United Kingdom of Great Britain and Ireland
- Died: 19 October 1912 (aged 55)

The Most Reverend John Joseph Clancy (1856–1912) was an Irish Roman Catholic clergyman who served as the Bishop of Elphin from 1895 to 1912.

He was born on 23 December 1856 in Sooey, County Sligo, Ireland. He was educated at the Marist Brothers school in sligo and Summerhill College, in 1876 he went to Maynooth College to study for the priesthood and was ordained priest on 22 June 1882.

== Priestly ministry ==
His first served as a teacher at Summerhill College in Sligo for five years before becoming Professor of English Literature at Maynooth College. Oratory, or the art of preaching was a particular skill of Clancy's and a separate Chair of Sacred Eloquence was created for him: his talents were sought for special occasions and, in 1895, he preached the sermon for the centenary of Maynooth.

== Episcopal ministry ==
He was appointed coadjutor bishop of the Diocese of Elphin and Titular Bishop of Achantus on 12 January 1895. He succeeded as the diocesan bishop of Elphin on 8 February 1895 and ordained bishop on 24 March 1895.

He continued the work of his predecessor in building such edifices as were necessary for the development of the faith though in Clancy's episcopacy this was mostly schools rather than churches, convents or presbyteries. While on the staff of Maynooth College he had become friends with Eugene O'Growney and assisted in the development of the Gaelic League, but took little part in active nationalist politics.

He died in office on 19 October 1912, aged 55 years old.

Catholic Church titles
Preceded by Laurence Gillooly	Bishop of Elphin; 1895–1912	Succeeded by Bernard Coyne
