= List of Catholic dioceses in Ireland =

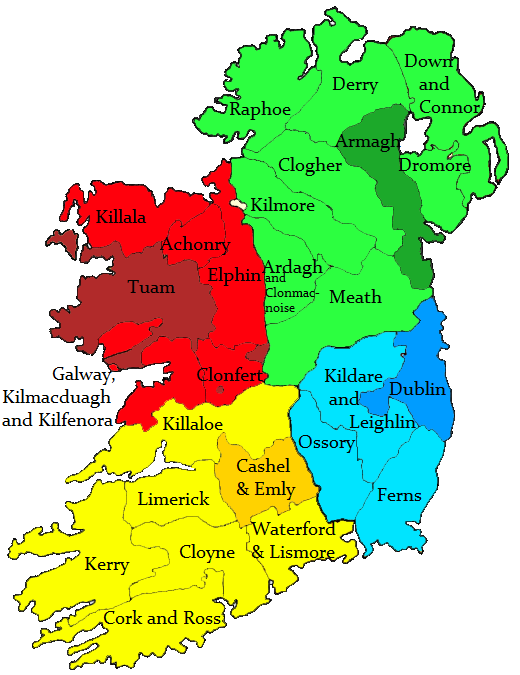
Catholic Dioceses on the island of Ireland. The colours indicate the ecclesiastical provinces, and the dark areas are archdioceses.

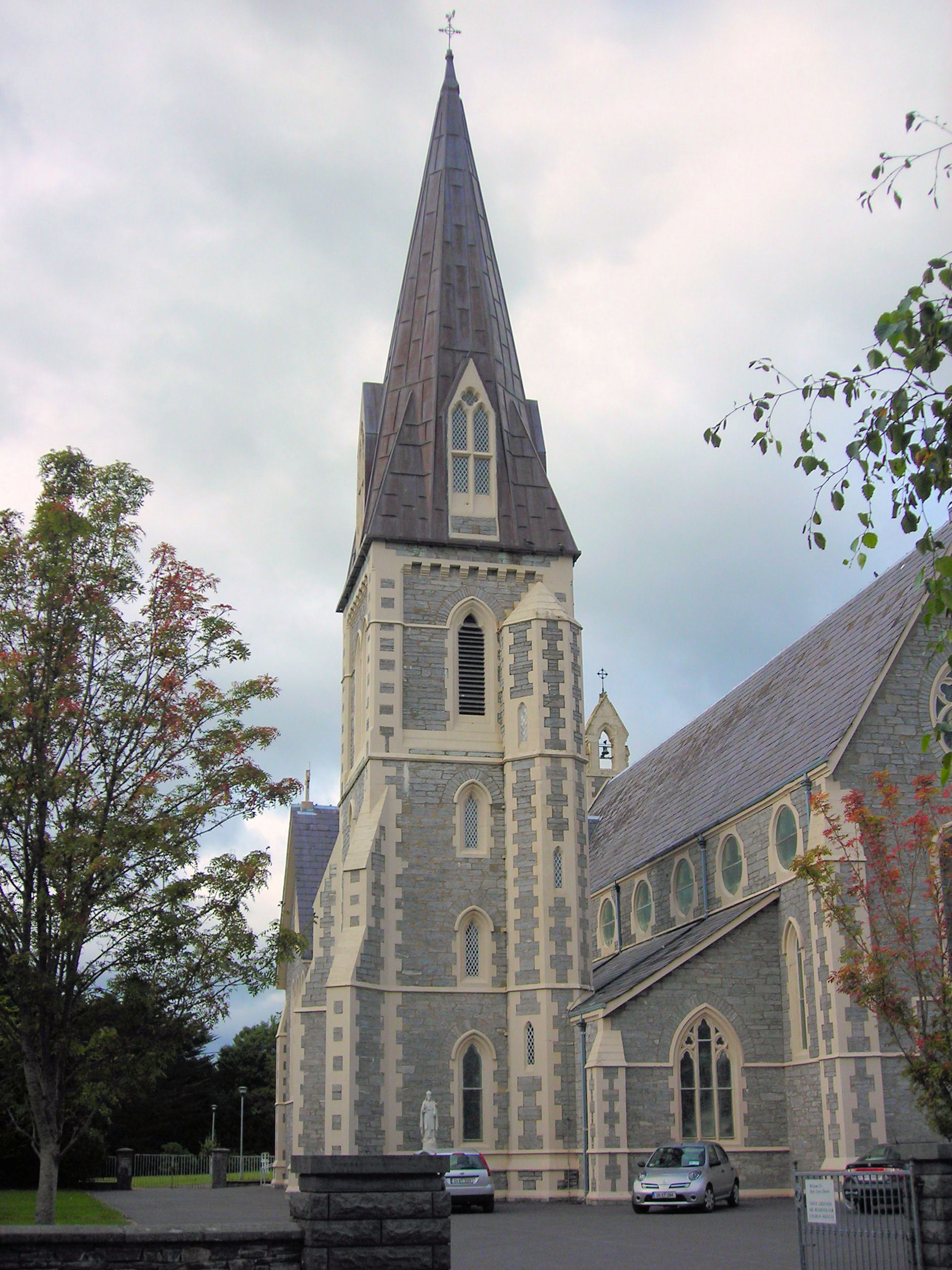
Holy Cross Church, Diocese of Kerry

This is a comprehensive list of Catholic dioceses in the island of Ireland. Catholicism in Ireland only maintains a Latin Church hierarchy, encompassing both the Republic of Ireland and Northern Ireland, having been unaffected by the partition of Ireland in 1920–22. There are no Eastern Catholic jurisdictions, nor other exempt ordinariates.

There are 26 dioceses in Ireland, each led by a diocesan bishop (including four Metropolitan Archdioceses). They are organised into a single all-island Episcopal Conference that is based in the primatial see of Armagh. The Holy See is represented by the Apostolic Nuncio to Ireland. A separate Apostolic Nunciature in London represents the Holy See in England, Wales and Scotland.

== Structural changes over the years ==
The diocesan system of Christian church government in Ireland was set up by the Synod of Rathbreasail in 1111 and modified by the Synod of Kells in 1152, replacing the earlier Celtic Christian monastic model. The island of Ireland is divided into four ecclesiastical provinces each headed by a metropolitan archbishop. The provinces were almost co-extensive with their contemporary civil counterparts. After the Reformation in Ireland, both the Protestant Church of Ireland and the Roman Catholic Church saw themselves as successors to the pre-Reformation church. Most bishops were non-resident during the enforcement of the Penal Laws, but the dioceses continued to exist. Whereas English Catholic dioceses were forbidden by law from having the same name as a diocese of the established Church of England, no such prohibition was made for Irish dioceses.

The Roman Catholic dioceses remained close to the original, with a few notable differences. Firstly, several dioceses with small populations were merged, and now have more than one name to represent their merger. Secondly, the Diocese of Galway was created in 1831 following the abolition of the Wardenship of Galway.

James Butler 2nd, the Archbishop of Cashel and Emly (1774–91), on being appointed by Rome moved his residence and cathedra from Cashel, favouring Thurles instead, where his successors continue to reign today. Similarly, in the Diocese of Elphin, the Cathedral, which was originally established in the County Roscommon town of Elphin, is now in Sligo.

Another change is that the ancient see of Kilfenora has been administered by the Bishop of Galway in the province of Tuam since the late 19th Century. The correct title of the Bishop is now the Bishop of Galway and Kilmacduagh and Apostolic Administrator of Kilfenora. More recently, the Diocese of Ross merged with the Diocese of Cork to form the Diocese of Cork and Ross in the 1950s.

== Geographic boundaries ==
Unlike many (European) countries, the boundaries of the Roman Catholic dioceses in Ireland do not conform with the political border between the Republic of Ireland (independent) and Northern Ireland (part of the UK). One archdiocese and three dioceses straddle the international border; two dioceses are wholly in Northern Ireland.

- Metropolitan Archdiocese of Armagh (includes parts of counties Armagh, Louth, Londonderry and Tyrone)
- Diocese of Clogher (includes parts of counties Tyrone, Fermanagh and Monaghan )
- Diocese of Derry (includes parts of counties Londonderry, Antrim, Donegal, and Tyrone)
- Diocese of Kilmore (includes parts of County Fermanagh)
- Diocese of Down and Connor (in Northern Ireland)
- Diocese of Dromore (in Northern Ireland)

== Current dioceses ==
=== Ecclesiastical province of Armagh ===
Approximating the civil province of Ulster; mainly in Northern Ireland.

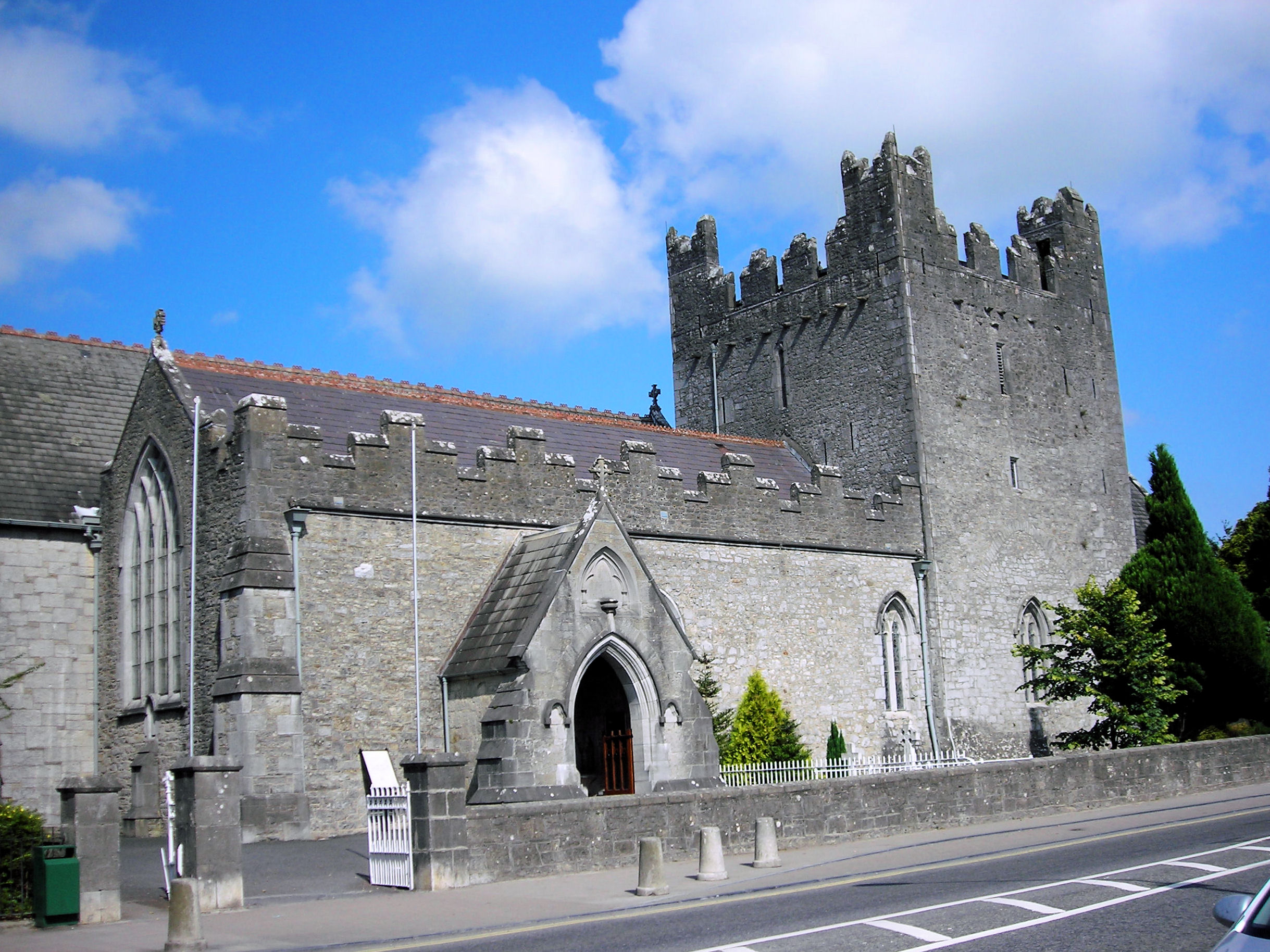
Holy Trinitarian Abbey, Diocese of Limerick

- Metropolitan Archdiocese of Armagh, primatial see of all Ireland – seat Northern Ireland, part in Republic of Ireland
  - Diocese of Ardagh (united with the titular bishopric Clonmacnois) – Republic of Ireland only
  - Diocese of Clogher - seat in Republic of Ireland, part in Northern Ireland
  - Diocese of Derry - seat Northern Ireland, part in Republic of Ireland
  - Diocese of Down and Connor - Northern Ireland only
  - Diocese of Dromore - Northern Ireland only
  - Diocese of Kilmore - seat Republic of Ireland, part in Northern Ireland
  - Diocese of Meath - Republic of Ireland only
  - Diocese of Raphoe - Republic of Ireland only

=== Ecclesiastical province of Cashel ===
Approximating the civil province of Munster.

- Metropolitan Archdiocese of Cashel and Emly
  - Diocese of Cloyne
  - Diocese of Cork and Ross
  - Diocese of Kerry
  - Diocese of Killaloe
  - Diocese of Limerick
  - Diocese of Waterford and Lismore

=== Ecclesiastical province of Dublin ===
Approximating the civil province of Leinster.

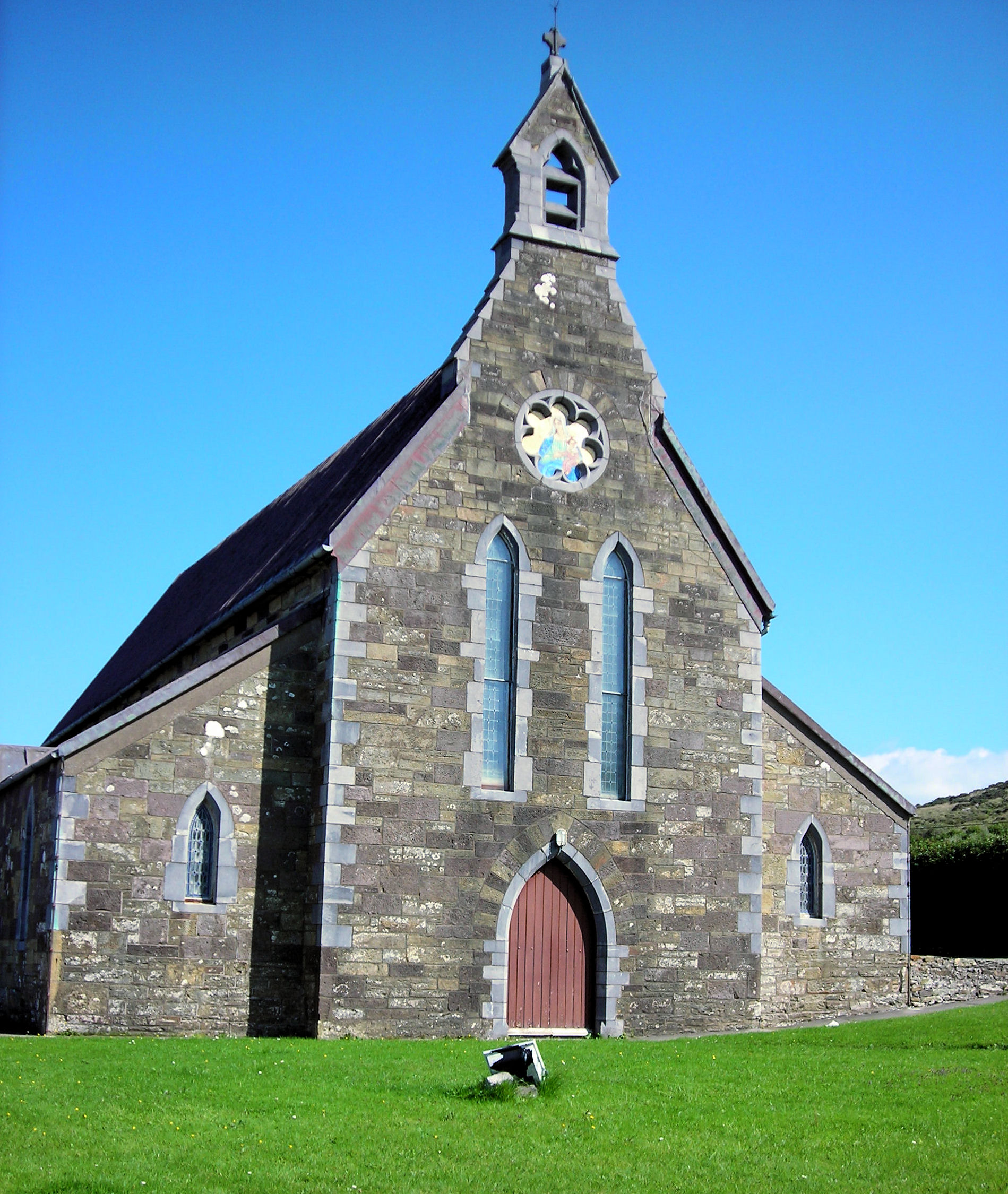
St. Vincent's Church, Diocese of Kerry

- Metropolitan Archdiocese of Dublin
  - Diocese of Ferns
  - Diocese of Kildare and Leighlin
  - Diocese of Ossory

=== Ecclesiastical province of Tuam ===
Approximating the civil province of Connacht.

- Metropolitan Archdiocese of Tuam
  - Diocese of Achonry
  - Diocese of Clonfert
  - Diocese of Elphin
  - Diocese of Galway and Kilmacduagh and Kilfenora
  - Diocese of Killala

As the Diocese of Kilfenora is in the Ecclesiastical province of Cashel, the Bishop of Galway and Kilmacduagh is its apostolic administrator rather than bishop.

== Former dioceses ==
There are seventeen titular sees in Ireland (of which two are united in personal union with current sees): Ardcarne, Ardmore, Ath Truim, Ceanannus Mór, Cell Ausaille, Cill Fhionnúrach (united with Galway and Kilmacduagh), Clonmacnoise (united with Diocese of Ardagh), Cluain Iraird, Cunga Féichin, Domnach Sechnaill, Duleek, Eanach Dúin, Glenndálocha, Inis Cathaig, Louth, Mageó, Roscrea, Slebte, Árd Sratha (formerly, as Ardstraw, an abbey nullius becoming a diocese, merged into Diocese of Cinél nEógain and Ardstraw; territory now in the List of Catholic dioceses in the Diocese of Derry).

== See also ==
- Irish Catholic Bishops' Conference
- List of Church of Ireland dioceses for the Anglican church
- List of Roman Catholic dioceses (alphabetical) (including archdioceses)
- List of Roman Catholic dioceses (structured view) (including archdioceses)
- List of Roman Catholic archdioceses (by country and continent)
- Apostolic Nuncio to Ireland

== Notes and references ==
Inline

In general

- Dioceses of Ireland
- 1836 Index of Roman Catholic Parishes

== Sources and External links ==
- Irish Bishops Conference - Map of the dioceses of Ireland.
- GCatholic.org - Republic.
- GCatholic.org - Northern Ireland.
- 2011 Census Boundaries, including shapefiles for Catholic dioceses; from the Central Statistics Office, Ireland
- Catholic-Hierarchy entry.
