= Dominic de Burgo =

Irish Roman Catholic cleric and Bishop of Elphin (c.1622–1704)

The Most Reverend Dominic de Burgo
- Church: Roman Catholic Church
- See: Bishop of Elphin
- In office: 1671–1691
- Predecessor: See vacant
- Successor: See vacant

Orders
- Consecration: 1671

Personal details
- Born: Dominic Burke c. 1622 Craughwell, County Galway, Ireland
- Died: 1 January 1704 (aged 81–82) Louvain

Dominic de Burgo (English: /dəˈbɜːr/ də-BUR; c. 1622–1 January 1704) was an Irish Roman Catholic cleric who was Bishop of Elphin in the late 17th century (1671–1691).

== Early life ==
Burke or de Burgo, was a native of Craughwell, County Galway, listed by Hugh Fenning as Of the family of Cahirkinvonivy. He was a descendant of the House of Burgh: the surname "de Burgo" is the Latinised form of this name (with the gaelicised form being de Búrca or Búrc).

== Career ==
de Burgo was professed at Athenry in 1648 and studied for six years in Segovia, later living in Pesaro, Treviso and Milan. He was listed as Definitor for Ireland at the General Chapter at Rome in 1670.

He was consecrated as Bishop of Elphin at Ghent in 1671, he was disliked by Oliver Plunkett, who stated he was "extravagant, imprudent in word and deed." He was exiled in 1691, living in poverty with the Franciscans of St. Anthony's, Louvain, where he died on 1 January 1704.

== See also ==
- House of Burgh, an Anglo-Norman and Hiberno-Norman dynasty founded in 1193
- Catholic Church in Ireland

Catholic Church titles
Preceded by Bernard O'Higgins	Bishop of Elphin; 1671–1704	Succeeded by Ambrose MacDermott
