= Christopher Jones (Roman Catholic bishop) =

Irish Roman Catholic bishop

Christy Jones
- Bishop of Elphin
- Church: Roman Catholic Church
- See: Diocese of Elphin
- In office: August 1994 - July 2014
- Predecessor: Dominic Joseph Conway
- Successor: Kevin Doran
- Previous posts: Administrator, Sligo Cathedral

Personal details
- Born: 3 March 1936 Roscommon, Ireland
- Died: 18 May 2018 (aged 82) Sligo, Ireland

Styles of Christopher Jones
- Reference style: The Right Reverend
- Spoken style: My Lord
- Religious style: Bishop
- Posthumous style: none

Christopher Jones (3 March 1936 – 18 May 2018) was an Irish Roman Catholic bishop in the Diocese of Elphin.

== Early life and education ==
He was born in Rathcroghan, County Roscommon, Ireland, as the second youngest child of eleven: one of his brothers also became a priest while three of his sisters joined the religious life.

He was ordained a priest on 17 June 1962 for his home diocese just before the Second Vatican Council, later remarking how much the teaching of the council had been part of his priestly ministry.

He spent many years as secondary school teacher, first on attachment to St Muredach's College, Ballina, County Mayo, for a year (1962–63) and then from 1965 to 1971 at Summerhill College, Sligo, where he was always pastorally active in the diocese.

An insight into this work was revealed in 2012 when he presided over, and preached, at the funeral of the matriarch of an important Irish Traveller family, Nan Ward. The bishop spoke about a meeting he attended in 1968 to improve the educational opportunities for Travellers. During these years he was also Vocations Director for the Diocese of Elphin.

He served as director of Sligo Social Services from 1973 to 1987 and then served as the administrator of St. Mary's Cathedral Parish in Sligo from 1987 to 1994.

== Bishop of Elphin ==
On 24 May 1994 he was appointed bishop for the diocese. He was ordained a bishop on 15 August in the same year. The principal consecrator was Archbishop Emanuele Gerada, the apostolic nuncio to Ireland; his principal co-bonsecrators were Archbishop Joseph Cassidy and Bishop Thomas Finnegan.

The general perception of Jones was that he generally conducted himself with humility.

In March 2010 after the publication of the Ryan and Murphy reports into child abuse under church authorities in 2009, Jones accused the media of being "unfair and unjust" to the Catholic Church through a concentration on the handling by church authorities of the clerical child sex-abuse issue. "Could I just say with all this emphasis on cover-up, the cover-up has gone on for centuries, not just in the church … It's going on today in families, in communities, in societies. Why are you singling out the church?” he asked. Bishop Jones was a member of the Bishops' Liaison Committee for Child Protection and was speaking at a press conference in Maynooth on 10 March 2010 where the Irish Bishops Conference was concluding its three-day spring meeting.

Jones also described the Bishop of Galway, Martin Drennan, who served as an auxiliary bishop of Dublin for seven years during the period investigated by the Murphy Commission, as "a scholar and a holy man" and that any reference to him in the Murphy Report had been positive.

In a statement, Why Marriage Matters, released by the bishops, they described provisions in the Civil Partnership Bill as "an extraordinary and far-reaching attack on freedom of conscience and the free practices of religion – which are guaranteed to every citizen under the Constitution". On the refusal by Minister for Justice Dermot Ahern to allow an opt-out clause for people who had issues of conscience when it came to association or involvement with same-sex ceremonies, he said the bishops were "very worried about that. Very worried".

On his 75th birthday in March 2011, Jones submitted his letter of resignation under the Code of Canon Law to Pope Benedict XVI. On 14 May 2014 it was announced he would be succeeded by Bishop Kevin Doran who was ordained bishop on 13 July 2014.

In retirement Jones retained a relatively low profile in his former diocese although his July 2015 comments about the future economic prospects for the West of Ireland were widely reported.

In recognition of his long connection with Summerhill College as student, teacher and patron a new suite of rooms were named after him, and opened in his presence in 2016.

Catholic Church titles
Preceded by Dominic Conway	Bishop of Elphin; 24 May 1994–13 July 2014	Succeeded by Kevin Doran
