= Alive! (newspaper) =

Irish religious publication

- The Alive! front page for July/August 2009
- Type: Monthly newspaper
- Publisher: Alive Group
- Editor: Fr. Brian McKevitt OP
- Associate editor: Tom English
- Founded: 1996
- Political alignment: Conservative Catholic/Right-Wing
- Language: English
- Headquarters: St Mary's Priory, Tallaght, Dublin 24
- Circulation: 240,000
- OCLC number: 500551304
- Website: alive.ie

Alive! is a free monthly publication in the style of a newspaper which has been produced since its first edition in 1996 by Alive Group, an organisation with an address at the Dominican Order St Mary's Priory, Tallaght in Dublin, Ireland. The editor is a Catholic priest, Fr Brian McKevitt, who refers to the publication as a 'newszine'. It is printed by Datascope, an independent publishing company in Enniscorthy and contains an appeal in each issue for donations totalling €160,000 annually to remain in circulation.

== Political stance and editorial opinion ==
Since September 2008, the front page has contained the following disclaimer text: "The content of the newspaper Alive! and the views expressed in it are those of the editor and contributors, and do not necessarily represent the views of the Irish Dominican Province".

The publication opposed the Nice Treaty and the Lisbon Treaty on all four occasions on which they were submitted to the Irish people, a position which drew criticism from Irish politicians such as Senator Paschal Donohoe on the grounds that its position could be erroneously interpreted by many Catholics as representing the official views of the Catholic hierarchy. TD Thomas Byrne criticised the publication, claiming that he was "bombarded" with its "anti-EU" views while attending Mass. Individual politicians and the Oireachtas sub-committee on Europe asked the Catholic Church and Seán Cardinal Brady to ban it from being distributed in churches. Senator Labhrás Ó Murchú stated that it was "completely wrong" to suggest that Cardinal Brady should ban the publication from churches simply because it espoused views opposing the Lisbon treaty. Senator Ivana Bacik defended the criticism of the publication stating that it espoused extreme views that most moderate Catholics opposed and that it was the "equivalent of the paramilitary wing of the Catholic Church".

Editor McKevitt was listed at number 67 in the Ireland's Most Influential 100 list published by Village magazine in 2009.

== Format ==
A regular article entitled "Dumbag writes...!" features letters, purportedly from a devil named Dumbag, which highlight what the newspaper believes to be the folly of non-Catholic viewpoints. This feature is inspired by The Screwtape Letters by the Anglican writer, C. S. Lewis. The newspaper also features a column by Fr. Owen Gorman, an interview with a public personage about the role of religion in that person's life, a column dealing with perceived media bias against religion and Christianity and a Window on History article on a historical topic of relevance to the Catholic Church (such as the Penal Laws or the Protestant Reformation).

== Contributors ==
Contributors to the newspaper's Monthly Musings include Irish poet and academic Dr. Ciarán Ó Coigligh, Bishop Kevin Doran and barrister, journalist and broadcaster Kieron Wood, Gerard Murphy, Peter Perrum, Tom English and former University College Dublin's Students' Union president Katie Ascough.

== Legal issues over covers ==
In June 2015 Dina Goldstein threatened to sue the magazine for using images from her "Fallen Princesses" works without her permission. One image appeared on the cover and others throughout the magazine. Ms Goldstein said that the magazine has not contacted her for permission to use the images. She said that she could not disagree more with the sentiments in the article which used the images, that she had left a message with the magazine's office and contacted an attorney to make a formal complaint.
