= Gillooly =

Gillooly may refer to:

- Gillooly, West Virginia, an unincorporated community in Lewis County
- Laurence Gillooly, an Irish Roman Catholic clergyman who served as the Bishop of Elphin
- Jeff Gillooly, one of the perpetrators involved in the assault of Nancy Kerrigan
