= Gabriel O'Kelly =

Irish Roman Catholic clergyman

The Most Reverend Gabriel O'Kelly
- Bishop of Elphin
- Church: Catholic Church
- Diocese: Diocese of Elphin
- In office: 26 March 1718 – 1731
- Predecessor: Ambrose MacDermott
- Successor: Patrick French

Orders
- Ordination: 1680 by Dominic Burke
- Consecration: 19 June 1718 by Edmund Kelly

Personal details
- Born: 1661 County Galway, Kingdom of Ireland
- Died: 4 August 1731 (aged 69–70)

The Most Reverend Gabriel O'Kelly (died 4 August 1731) was an Irish Roman Catholic clergyman who served as the Bishop of Elphin from 1718 to 1731.

Catholic Church titles
Preceded by Ambrose MacDermott	Bishop of Elphin; 1718–1731	Succeeded by Patrick French (bishop)
