= John Brett (bishop) =

Irish Roman Catholic clergyman

John Brett O.P.
- Bishop of Elphin
- Church: Catholic Church
- Diocese: Diocese of Elphin
- In office: 28 August 1748 – 22 June 1756
- Predecessor: Patrick French
- Successor: James O'Fallon
- Previous post: Bishop of Killala (1743-1748)

Orders
- Consecration: 8 September 1743 by Antonio Saverio Gentili

Personal details
- Died: 22 June 1756

John Brett O.P. (?– 22 June 1756) was an Irish Roman Catholic clergyman who served as the Bishop of Killala from 1743 to 1748 and as Bishop of Elphin from 1748 to 1756.

Catholic Church titles
Preceded by Bernard O'Rourke	Bishop of Killala; 1743–1748	Succeeded by Michael Skerrett
Preceded by Patrick French (bishop)	Bishop of Elphin; 1748–1756	Succeeded by James O'Fallon
