= St. Aloysius College, Athlone =

St. Aloysius College
- Coláiste Naomh Aloysius

Location
- Deer Park Road; Athlone; Ireland
- Coordinates: 53.4201°N 7.9457°W

Information
- Motto: Per ardua ad astra (Success through Effort)
- Established: 1960
- Closed: 2017
- Gender of pupils: Male
- Campus type: Urban
- Website: www.staloysiuscollege.ie

St. Aloysius College (Irish: Coláiste Naomh Aloysius) was a secondary school in Athlone, County Westmeath, Ireland. It was primarily a school for boys, though its Leaving Certificate Repeat Programme was open to all students.

== History ==
The school was founded in 1960 by Monsignor John McCarthy and Dr. Vincent Hanly, Bishop of Elphin. The institution is named after Aloysius Gonzaga, the Renaissance Italian aristocrat born in 1568, who joined the Jesuits, and was canonized by Pope Benedict XIII in 1726.

The first classes took place in a small room attached to the Dean Crowe Theatre. The school later moved to a much larger, dedicated location at Deer Park Road, its present-day location. The Georgian house there, built in 1820, was the sole venue for classes in the early years after the move, but as the number of pupils grew, newer classrooms, study areas and recreation facilities were built.

The late Dr. Joseph Ducke, author, and founder of the 'Passionfruit Theatre', taught English at the school.

In 2010, the college partnered with Élan Corporation in a business-to-education learning initiative.

From the start of the 2017/2018 academic year, the school merged with St. Joseph's College, Summerhill, with the new name of Colaiste Chiaráin, named after the local saint Ciarán of Clonmacnoise. The new school is located at the existing Summerhill site, on the outskirts of Athlone, with a new name, and new management structures.

== Awards and academic achievements ==
In 2014, the school won third place in the technology category at the Young Scientist Exhibition, with students Lochlann O’Regan, Paul Rushe and Eryk Zaplata answer to the question 'Can non-proprietary/open-source software be used to emulate large scale proprietary text to speech systems?'. Also in 2014 students Dylan Fuery, Chris Halota and Oisin Prendergast won a Display award at the Young Scientist Exhibition with their project "Can an architectural program be combined to create a interactive map?". The project later won first place in its category at Sci Fest.

Also in 2014, the school won the SEAI Sustainable Energy Award at the SciFest event at Athlone Institute of Technology, with pupil Aaron Broughall's project 'Let your devices soak up the rain', under the mentor-ship of teacher Bill Kearney, while student Loughlan O'Regan was recognised with a Junior Ericsson Technology Award for his project 'Teaching the basics of sailing using information technology tools'.

== Notable alumni ==
- Michael Duignan, Catholic bishop
- Denis Naughten, TD and minister
- Owen Killian, CEO of Aryzta
