= Thomas Chester =

Thomas Chester may refer to:

- Thomas Morris Chester (1834–1892), American war correspondent, lawyer and soldier in the American Civil War
- Tommy Chester (1907–1979), footballer
- Tom Chester, one of the United States national amateur boxing middleweight champions
- Thomas Chester (died 1583), MP for Bristol and Gloucestershire
- Thomas Chester (1696–1763), MP for Gloucestershire
- Thomas Chester (bishop), Anglican bishop of Elphin
