= George Joseph Plunket Browne =

Irish Catholic bishop

- Bishop of Elphin
- Church: Catholic Church
- Diocese: Diocese of Elphin
- In office: 26 March 1844 – 1 December 1858
- Predecessor: Patrick Burke
- Successor: Laurence Gillooly
- Previous post: Bishop of Galway (1831-1844)

Orders
- Ordination: 1818
- Consecration: 23 October 1831 by Oliver Kelly

Personal details
- Born: 1795 Dangan House, Kilmore (west of Aghamore), County Roscommon, Kingdom of Ireland, British Empire
- Died: 1 December 1858 (aged 62–63) Roscommon, County Roscommon, United Kingdom of Great Britain and Ireland

George Joseph Plunket Browne (1795–1858) was an Irish Roman Catholic clergyman. Born to a "well-known Roscommon family", he served as Bishop of Galway from 1831 until 1844, and afterward as Bishop of Elphin, until his death on 1 December 1858. He was charged with being a "Cullenite" in 1855, that is, a follower of ultramontane Paul Cardinal Cullen.

== Biography ==
Browne was born in 1795 in Dangan House in the parish of Kilmore, diocese of Elphin, near Carrick-on-Shannon. His ancestors came originally from Coolarne, Athenry, Co. Galway. The family residence was at Cloonfad, Co. Roscommon. At 17 years of age, in 1812, he entered Maynooth College, and was ordained in 1818. He was appointed Administrator of St. Peters Parish, Athlone from 1823 – 1825, and again in 1826 – 1831. Simultaneously from 1823 - 1825 he was also parish priest of Aughrim Parish at the other end of the diocese of Elphin. In 1829 he lived at King Street, now Pearse Street, in Athlone.

=== Bishop of Galway ===
At the age of 36 he was chosen to fill the new see of Galway. On 31 July 1831 the Pope approved his appointment. Dr. Browne was consecrated in Athlone on 23 October that year. The ceremony was performed by Archbishop Oliver Kelly of Tuam, and assisted by Bishops Burke of Elphin, and McNicholas of Achonry. His motto was "Fortiter et Fideliter (Firmly and Faithfully)". He carried out his administration in a peaceful and diplomatic manner. The great Daniel O'Connell justly called him "The Dove of Galway".

Browne was an enthusiastic learner of the Irish language, but found it difficult to master and by 1844 he proposed in a public letter that to facilitate this learning, it should be written phonetically. He encouraged secondary education and with Dr Ffrench he was joint patron of the new Patrician Brothers boys boarding school which opened in 1837 at Clarinbridge. He recognised the need to increase the number of church buildings and in May 1837 he left for England to collect money for the new St. Patrick's Church in Galway. He dedicated a new church in Oughterard in August of the same year. He had the disadvantage of being both popular & poor and was unable to make his ad limina visit to Rome in 1836 but instead sent a detailed written report. He estimated that his income was about one seventh of that of the average Irish Bishop of the time. In May 1839, he brought the Ursuline Order of nuns to Dangan on the Oughterard road beside his own residence.

Browne was involved in the two dynamic social factors at the time, politics and religion. He was an ardent supporter of O'Connell. He presided at meetings in Galway of the Precursor Society founded by O'Connell to bring about reforms in October and November 1838, and from 1840 he actively supported the Repeal movement. Following the death of Bishop Burke of Elphin in 1843, Dr. Browne was proposed by the Elphin priests to succeed him. Archbishop MacHale attributed Dr. Browne's conciliatory manner, wisdom and ability to the pacific and flourishing state of the diocese at the time. He acknowledged to Dr. Paul Cullen in Rome that he did not know anyone more fitting for the diocese of Elphin. His great knowledge and piety prompted the clergy in such numbers to give him preferences, although Dr. Browne made no move to secure the more prosperous see for himself. He adopted a deliberate policy of silence. On 10 March 1844 the Pope gave his assent to transfer him to Elphin. Dr. Browne of Elphin continued to actively support Daniel O'Connell and in 1844 he presided at a meeting of protest against his imprisonment. Later the Bishop fell foul of the Young Irelanders and Charles Gavan Duffy, who wrote him a letter of protest. When O'Connell heard this he sent a sympathetic letter to Dr. Browne which is now preserved in the Elphin Diocesan Archives. Mother McCauley of the Mercy Order greatly esteemed the Bishop, whose meek suave character so much impressed her friend O'Connell that he used to call him the Dove, and on his translation to another see the 'Dove of Elphin'.

The Ursuline Order followed Browne to Elphin, first to Summerhill in Athlone and then to Sligo. He raffled his carriage to raise funds to compensate the sisters for the financial loss they suffered by removing to Sligo. According to Fr. Martin Coen, he was a man of singularly mild temperament, well liked by the majority of his priests and people. An entry in the Annals of the Sisters of Mercy, by Mother mcCauley in 1840 reads ...'You may be sure patronage is greatly divided here, each house has its party, Presentation, Dominican, Augustinian, Franciscan, Ursulines etc., and now Sisters of Mercy. The Ursulines are said to enjoy most of episcopal patronage, but Bishop Browne has love and charity enough for thousands and embraces all with genuine paternal care and apostolic affection'.

In the Freemans Journal of 29 April 1848, it stated that by late 1847 the Strokestown Estate had become a byword for mass-eviction. Browne was one of a number of influential individuals who publicly attacked Irish Landlords, including Major Mahon, for their harsh policy of eviction. The Mahons responded with an attempt to embarrass the Bishop by reporting that his own brother Patrick Browne had evicted tenants from his holdings at Cloonfad, County Roscommon. The Bishop retaliated by publishing a list townland by townland of 605 families dispossessed of their lands and houses in the immediate vicinity of Strokestown, Co. Roscommon amounting to 3006 persons evicted by the Mahon family. A letter written by the Bishop on 26 April 1848 to the Earl of Shrewsbury on the 'Mahon Evictions' was also printed in the journal on that date.

Browne died on 1 December 1858, at his home in Abbey St., Roscommon. He was buried in the church now known as the Harrison Hall. His remains were removed to the Priests' burial ground immediately behind the Church of the Sacred Heart when it was built.

== Sources ==
- Old Athlone Society: George Joseph Plunkett Browne by Martin Coen
- The Wardenship of Galway 1791 – 1831 by Martin Coen
- Letter to the Earl of Shrewsbury re the Mahon Evictions, 26 April 1848

Catholic Church titles
Preceded by Patrick Burke	Bishop of Elphin; 1844–1858	Succeeded by Laurence Gillooly
