= James O'Fallon =

Roman Catholic bishop of Elphin, Ireland

- Bishop of Elphin
- Church: Catholic Church
- Diocese: Diocese of Elphin
- In office: 14 August 1756 – 2 December 1786
- Predecessor: John Brett
- Successor: E. French

Personal details
- Died: 2 December 1786

The Most Reverend James O'Fallon (before 1756 – 2 December 1786) was an Irish Roman Catholic clergyman who served as the Bishop of Elphin from 1756 to 1786.

Catholic Church titles
Preceded by John Brett (bishop)	Bishop of Elphin; 1756–1786	Succeeded by Edward French (bishop)
