= Dominic Burke (bishop) =

Bishop of Elphin

Dominic Burke OP
- Bishop of Elphin
- Church: Catholic Church
- Diocese: Diocese of Elphin
- In office: 13 July 1671 – 1 January 1704
- Predecessor: William Burgat
- Successor: Ambrose MacDermott

Orders
- Ordination: 1670
- Consecration: 22 November 1671 by Eugenius Albertus d’Allamont

Personal details
- Born: c. 1639
- Died: 1 January 1704 (aged 64–65)

Dominic Burke (c. 1639 – 1 January 1704) was an Irish Roman Catholic bishop who served as the Bishop of Elphin from 1671 to 1704.

Catholic Church titles
Preceded by Bernard O'Higgins	Bishop of Elphin; 1671–1704	Succeeded by Ambrose MacDermott
