= Patrick French (bishop) =

Irish Roman Catholic clergyman

Patrick French O.F.M.
- Bishop of Elphin
- Church: Catholic Church
- Diocese: Diocese of Elphin
- In office: 23 November 1731 – 27 August 1748
- Predecessor: Gabriel O'Kelly
- Successor: John Brett

Orders
- Consecration: c. 1732

Personal details
- Died: 27 August 1748

Patrick French (?–1748) was an Irish Roman Catholic clergyman who served as the Bishop of Elphin from 1731 to 1748.

Catholic Church titles
| Preceded by Gabriel O'Kelly | Bishop of Elphin; 1731–1748 | Succeeded by John Brett (bishop) |
