= Edward Doorly =

Irish Roman Catholic clergyman

- Bishop of Elphin
- Church: Catholic Church
- Diocese: Diocese of Elphin
- In office: 17 July 1926 – 5 April 1950
- Predecessor: Bernard Coyne
- Successor: Vincent Hanly
- Previous posts: Titular Bishop of Sarepta (1923-1926); Coadjutor Bishop of Elphin (1923-1926)

Orders
- Ordination: 23 June 1895
- Consecration: 24 June 1923 by Thomas Gilmartin

Personal details
- Born: 23 November 1868 Clooneenbane, Oran (southeast of Ballintober), County Roscommon, United Kingdom of Great Britain and Ireland
- Died: 5 April 1950 (aged 81)

The Most Reverend Edward Doorly (23 November 1868 in County Roscommon – 5 April 1950), was an Irish Roman Catholic clergyman who served as the Bishop of Elphin from 1926 to 1950.

The national school in Forthill, Sligo was dedicated in honour of St. Edward as an expression of appreciation of the educational work of Bishop Doorly, the founder and first patron of the school. The school was for both boys and girls, though they were taught in separate classrooms until 1975. In 1994 the school kept its name but moved to Ballytivnan.

Doorly park in Sligo was also named after the Bishop Doorly. The park contains an arch in his honor.

In 1936, during the Spanish civil war, Doorly gave a passionate sermon in Sligo Cathedral describing the killing of priests in Spain. Following the sermon, 11 Sligo volunteers set off for Spain to fight for Franco.

Catholic Church titles
Preceded by Bernard Coyne (bishop)	Bishop of Elphin; 1926–1950	Succeeded by Vincent Hanly
