= John Lynch (bishop of Elphin) =

Irish bishop in 16th and 17th centuries

John Fitzjames Lynch was an Irish Anglican bishop at the end of the sixteenth century and the beginning of the seventeenth.

Lynch was born in Galway and educated at New Inn Hall, Oxford. He was Rector of Littleton-upon-Severn in 1561; and Canon of Wells in 1564. He was Bishop of Elphin from 1583 until his resignation on 19 August 1611, following his conversion to the Roman Catholic faith.

He had greatly impoverished his see by selling off property, but his successor as bishop, Edward King, restored it to its former prosperity.

Lynch is mentioned in the Annals of Loch Cé (written by Catholic clergy) for 1588:

There was a wicked, heretical, bishop in Oilfinn [Elphin]; and God performed great miracles upon him. And his place of residence was in the Grainsech of Machaire-riabhach [Maghereagh]; and a shower of snow was shed for him, and a wild apple was not larger than each stone of it; and not a grain was left in his town; and it was with shovels the snow was removed from the houses; and it was in the middle month of summer that shower fell.

The midwinter snowfall was more likely a symptom of the ongoing Little Ice Age.

Church of England titles
Preceded by Thomas Chester	Bishop of Elphin; 1583–1611	Succeeded by Edward King
