= George Thomas Plunkett =

Irish Roman Catholic clergyman

George Thomas Plunkett was Born in 1765 Macnadilla Croghan Co Roscommon

George Thomas Plunkett (1765 -8 May 1827) was an Irish Roman Catholic clergyman who served as the Bishop of Elphin from 1814 to 1827.

Catholic Church titles
| Preceded by Edward French | Bishop of Elphin; 1814–1827 | Succeeded by Patrick Burke |
