= Cullenite =

Follower of any person named Cullen

A Cullenite is a follower of any person named Cullen. Notable Cullens to have followers referred to as Cullenites have included the Scottish physician William Cullen and particularly Paul Cardinal Cullen, archbishop of Dublin and the first cardinal from Ireland.

Notable Cullenites who followed Cardinal Cullen included George Joseph Plunket Browne, Bishop of Elphin, and Patrick Francis Moran, archbishop of Sidney and the first cardinal from Australia; indeed, "Cullenite" is used as an adjective in the phrases "Cullenite network" (used to describe a group of bishops who had been students of or were related to Cardinal Cullen, and many of whom became highly influential in the churches of Australia and New Zealand) and "the Cullenite church", used to describe the Irish church until the 1960, a church strongly allied to the "rural bourgeoisie" and the rising class of what are called "strong-farmers".
