= Ambrose MacDermott =

Irish Roman Catholic bishop

Ambrose MacDermott OP STM
- Bishop of Elphin
- Church: Catholic Church
- Diocese: Diocese of Elphin
- In office: 31 March 1707 – September 1717
- Predecessor: Dominic Burke
- Successor: Gabriel O'Kelly

Orders
- Consecration: August 1707

Personal details
- Born: 1651 Boyle, County Roscommon, Kingdom of Ireland
- Died: September 1717 (aged 65–66)

Ambrose MacDermott OP, STM, (c. 1651 – September 1717) was an Irish Roman Catholic bishop. From Boyle, County Roscommon, the son of Cornelius MacDermott. He was educated at the Dominican monastery at Tulsk in Roscommon where he joined the Dominicans in 1667 and continued his studies in Spain. He lectured in theology in Spain, and in Rome at the College of Saints Sixtus and Clemente in Rome serving as prior from 1686 to 1689. Conferred with a STP – Sacrae theologiae praesentatus (Bachelor of Sacred Theology) in 1699, and he was awarded a Master of Sacred Theology (STM) in 1701. He was nominated to the see of Elphin by the Catholic Stuart King James III, and he served as the Bishop of Elphin from 1707 to 1717.

Catholic Church titles
Preceded by Dominic Burke (bishop)	Bishop of Elphin; 1707–1717	Succeeded by Gabriel O'Kelly
