= Patrick Burke (bishop) =

Irish Roman Catholic clergyman and Bishop of Elphin (1779 –1843)

The Right Reverend Patrick Burke
- Church: Roman Catholic Church
- See: Bishop of Elphin
- In office: 1827–1843
- Predecessor: George Thomas Plunkett
- Successor: George Joseph Plunket Browne

Orders
- Ordination: Deacon (1802); Priest (1803)

Personal details
- Born: Patrick Burke; 1779 Lisnageeragh (Lisnageera), Ireland
- Died: 16 September 1843 (aged 63–64)
- Residence: Seaville House, County Sligo
- Education: St Patrick's College, Maynooth

Patrick Burke (1779 – 16 September 1843) was an Irish Roman Catholic clergyman who served as the Bishop of Elphin from 1827 to 1843.

== Career ==
Born in 1779 in Lisnageeragh (Lisnageera), he matriculated in St. Patrick's College, Maynooth in 1799, ordained a deacon in 1802 and a priest in 1803. He served in his native diocese, and in 1810 served as parish priest of Ballinakill and Kilcronan and in 1812 was appointed parish priest of Glinsk. In 1819, in Maynooth College he was ordained as Coadjutor Bishop of Elphin. He was also appointed Titular Bishop of Augustopolis in Phrygia.

Burke was elected Bishop of Elphin on 8 May 1827. As bishop, he resided in Seaville House, County Sligo, part of the Vernon estate, following his death his house became the Ursuline Convent.

Dr. Burke is buried in the family vault in Kilcroan Cemetery, Ballymoe, County Galway.

== See also ==
- House of Burgh, an Anglo-Norman and Hiberno-Norman dynasty founded in 1193
- Catholic Church in Ireland

Catholic Church titles
Preceded by George Thomas Plunkett	Bishop of Elphin; 1827–1843	Succeeded by George Joseph Plunket Browne
