= Edward French (bishop) =

Irish Roman Catholic clergyman

The Most Reverend Edward French (?–29 April 1810) was an Irish Roman Catholic clergyman who served as the Bishop of Elphin from 1787 to 1810.

Catholic Church titles
Preceded by James O’Fallon	Bishop of Elphin; 1787–1810	Succeeded by George Thomas Plunkett
