= Edward King (bishop of Elphin) =

Anglo-Irish bishop

Edward King (died 8 March 1639) was a Church of Ireland Bishop of Elphin from 1611 to 1639.

King was an Englishman, a native of Huntingdonshire. His predecessor as bishop of Elphin, John Lynch, greatly impoverished the see by alienating properties and in 1611 resigned, declaring himself a Roman Catholic. During more than a quarter of a century as bishop, King was able to recover Lynch's alienations and much improved the revenue of the diocese. Dod's Peerage of 1848 says of him that "...his bishopric, which he found the poorest, he left one of the richest in all Ireland".

In 1638, King was offered the Archbishopric of Tuam, but "flatly refused". Thomas Wentworth, 1st Earl of Strafford, Lord Deputy of Ireland, mentions him honourably in a letter to William Laud, Archbishop of Canterbury, calling him "truly a Royal bishop".

He married firstly Anne Coxsed of Cambridgeshire and secondly Grace Sampson, daughter of Nathaniel Sampson of Leicestershire, and granddaughter of the noted preacher Thomas Sampson, prebendary of St. Paul's Cathedral. By two marriages he had at least fifteen children. King is the ancestor of the King Baronets of Charlestown, and the title is now held by his descendant Sir Wayne Alexander King, 8th Baronet (b. 1962). He is also through his granddaughter Anne, daughter of one of his younger sons John the ancestor of the well-known French family of Frenchpark.
