= Bernard O'Higgins =

Irish Roman Catholic bishop (died 1564)

Bernard O'Higgins (? – 25 February 1564) was an Irish Roman Catholic bishop. He served as the Bishop of Elphin from 1542 to 1564.

Catholic Church titles
Preceded by	Bishop of Elphin; 1542–1564	Succeeded by Dominic Burke (bishop)
