= Gillooly, West Virginia =

Unincorporated community in West Virginia, United States

- Unincorporated community
- Location within the state of West Virginia Gillooly (the United States)
- Coordinates: 38°58′39″N 80°34′12″W
- Country: United States
- State: West Virginia
- County: Lewis
- Elevation: 869 ft (265 m)
- Time zone: UTC-5 (Eastern (EST))
  - Summer (DST): UTC-4 (EDT)
- GNIS ID: 1554555

Gillooly is an unincorporated community in Lewis County, West Virginia, United States. Its post office is closed.
