= Thomas Chester (bishop) =

Irish Anglican bishop

Thomas Chester was an Irish Anglican bishop in the penultimate decade of the sixteenth century (1580s). The son of William Chester Lord Mayor of London, he was Bishop of Elphin from 1580 until 1583.His elder brother was the first Chester baronet.

Church of England titles
Preceded by Roland de Burgo	Bishop of Elphin; 1580–1583	Succeeded by John Lynch
