= Dina Goldstein =

Canadian artist (born 1969)

Dina Goldstein דינה גולדשטין
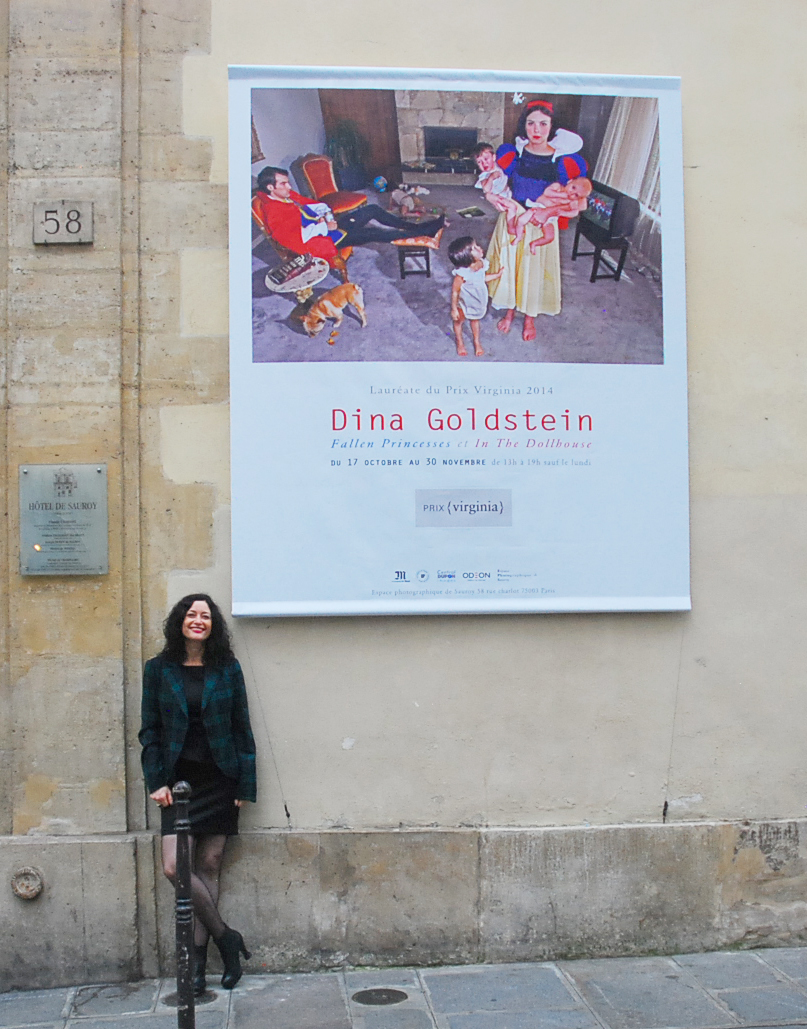
- Goldstein at the Prix Virginia in Paris, France (2014).
- Born: December 28, 1969 (age 56); Tel Aviv, Israel
- Known for: Photographer
- Notable work: Fallen Princesses, In The Dollhouse, Gods Of Suburbia
- Awards: 2016 Sony Awards Short list2016 Arte Laguna Photographic Selection2014 Grand winner Prix Virginia
- Website: www.dinagoldstein.com

Dina Goldstein (Hebrew: דינה גולדשטין; born 1969) is a visual artist based in Vancouver, British Columbia, Canada. Goldstein creates tableau with a nuanced visual language that places the mundane and everyday in unusual settings to inspire insight into the human condition. Goldstein began her career over 30 years ago as a photojournalist, evolving from a documentary and editorial photographer into an independent artist focusing on large-scale productions of nuanced Narrative Photography tableaux. Her work is highly conceptual and complex social commentary; incorporating cultural archetypes and iconography from the collective common imagination with narratives inspired by the human condition. Leaning into the visual language of pop surrealism, she stages compositions that expose the underbelly of modern life, challenging the notions of cultural influence and inherent belief systems. Goldstein's alternate realities question the adaptation, the societal acceptance of fictional stories and characters inspired by ideology, politics and religion. The vivid and provocative still imagery emerges through an entirely cinematic technique, with Dina’s established methodology following a precise pre- to post production process. The artist is most known for her series "Fallen Princesses", created in 2007, which depicts humanized Disney Princesses placed in realistic, modern scenarios. The series envisions how the lives of these famous characters would have played out in the real world, and touches on such everyday scourges as poverty, obesity, cancer and pollution. Goldstein was awarded the Arte Laguna special prize in 2012. In 2014, Goldstein won the grand prize at Prix Virginia; her work was exhibited in Paris, France.

== Early life and education ==
Dina Goldstein was born in Tel Aviv, Israel, and in 1976 emigrated to Canada. Goldstein studied art history and photography at Langara College in Vancouver, British Columbia, and completed her studies in 1993.

== Photography ==
Goldstein's career in photography started with photojournalism and documentary work (1993–2000), she went on to photograph editorial and commissioned work for magazines and advertising agencies (2000–2009). Her first public exhibition was Images of Gaza (2001), a series of black and white portraits of people living in the West Bank and Gaza.

=== Fallen Princesses (2009) ===
Goldstein's first large-scale tableau series Fallen Princesses debuted publicly in 2009. The series was exhibited in numerous galleries, at group show at BYU Museum of Art, and in the Musée De La Femme in Quebec, Canada in 2013.

The series consists of 10 photographs depicting Disney Princesses and other Fairy Tale characters placed within a modern environment. By embracing the textures and colors created by Walt Disney, which built a multibillion-dollar empire exploiting these fairy tales, the work questions the notion of the idealistic 'Happily Ever After' motif, composed by Disney, and spoon fed to children throughout the world.

=== In the Dollhouse (2012) ===
In a series of large-format photographic tableaus, Goldstein creates a storyline for the Barbie and Ken dolls, using real-life models. Trapped in a loveless marriage, Ken struggles with his sexuality. Using sequential story-telling, Goldstein creates a bright, plastic, pop-surrealist narrative. "The series unfolds a tragicomic tale of the perils of being plastic and the potential for salvation through authenticity. Barbie gets the short end of that stick – in Goldstein's telling of her story, she endures psychological dysfunction, an emotional breakdown, a really bad haircut and, ultimately, decapitation. Ken finds his authenticity and finally realizes true happiness".

=== Gods of Suburbia (2014) ===
Gods of Suburbia is Goldstein's third large-scale project. The work is a visual analysis of religious faith within the context of the modern forces of technology, science and secularism. The series plays with narrative and religious iconography in order to communicate how organized belief has become twisted within a global framework driven by consumerism and greed.

"By constructing a cosmetic reality, one that mirrors our own, Goldstein doesn't evade discussion, but rather creates it. In doing so, Gods and deities, believed to be too sacred for criticism, are personified and whose religious practices contradict their dogma".

=== Modern Girl (2016) ===
Modern Girl 2016, Inspired by Chinese advertising posters of the 1930s, Modern Girl examines identity, gender roles, diasporic cultures, and consumerism. By re-imagining iconic Chinese advertisements to critique the beauty, health and wellness industries, Modern Girl investigates how traditional gender roles, and individualistic consumer values have constructed and used women's bodies to market and sell products. According to Goldstein, the visual source inspiration of 1930s Chinese advertising posters is central in capturing the tensions of past traditions and the push for modernity: "The breaking away from filial tradition in this era saw the emergence of Asian women coming into their individuality," says Goldstein. "At the same time, modern gender roles and expectations opened the door to exploit the female form for marketing and advertising campaigns."

=== Snapshots From The Garden Of Eden (2017) ===
Snapshots From The Garden Of Eden (2017), was commissioned by the Contemporary Jewish Museum Of San Francisco for the group exhibit Jewish Folktales Retold: Artist as Maggid; based on 100 Jewish tales, collected and retold by folklorist Howard Schwartz, in the book 'Leaves From The Garden Of Eden'. For this Goldstein photographed a series of 11 large-scale black and white theatrical images, modernized scenes from each of the four primary types of tales: fairy tales, folktales, supernatural tales and mystical tales. The series features rich and ethnically diverse characters, made up of divine royalty, temptresses, supernatural spirits, and Hasidic figures. Goldstein uses dreamscapes and symbolism to explore, and subvert popular traditional Jewish themes like destiny, temptation, justice, wisdom, blind faith and circumstance. Snapshots From The Garden Of Eden is a traveling series, exhibited at the Museo Ebraico, Venice, in 2018, and currently being presented internationally at Jewish museums and centers.

=== The 10 Commandments (2019) ===
The 10 Commandments (2019), inspired by the election of Donald Trump in 2016, exposes the deceit, hypocrisy and misogyny displayed within the US body politic. The series seeks to examine the sociopolitical makeup of America through its political icons, the presidential figures that mark the most notable and controversial chapters in American history. Each tableau features a President portrayed through the prism of their politics, popularity and/or notoriety, further contextualized by a contemporary backdrop, and assigned one of the postulates of the Ten Commandments. These, often humorous, narrative juxtapositions aim to deconstruct the layers of political deceit, exposing latent hypocrisies and challenging the integrity of a system that is supposed to be a model of democracy and social progress. Although most political of her work yet, it aligns with the theme she continues to revisit in her art, one of disillusionment.

=== OG PUNK (2021) ===
Dina Goldstein has photographed key figures from the legendary punk rock scene of the late 1970s and 1980s in Vancouver and Victoria. The portraits in OG Punk from this ongoing series were shot with a neutral studio backdrop, establishing a mood of staged and theatrical artifice. The subjects self-consciously perform for the camera, showing off their punk rock regalia, spiked hairdos, and tattoos. Some pose with playful bravado, others are more introverted, even melancholic. Seen as they are today, these original punks come across as individual personalities more than subculture personas as their nicknames imply. Distinctions between costume and everyday adornment are hard to decipher, drawing attention to the limits of self-fashioning. Each portrait carries this tension between the public display of social identity and personal expression.The exhibition reveals clues to the ethos of punk as an anarchistic, youth counterculture rebelling against mainstream society. As evident in wendythirteen’s collection of skull ornaments and bands called Dayglo Abortions, Death Sentence, and Subhumans, dystopian attitudes prevailed. Political concerns were a motivating force, just as in the 1970s youthful punk idealism took the art world by storm and its music across the globe was steeped in political motivations. For Goldstein's subjects, punk is not so much a movement but a persistent attitude that as Lisa Jak claims: "as long as there is ignorance, oppression, and intolerance will be here to fight back. Based in Vancouver, Dina Goldstein has been a photojournalist for thirty years. With a focus on social commentary, she produces documentary, editorial and staged tableau photography that have been published widely and included in many international exhibitions."

The Polygon Gallery, Curator Helga Pakasaar

== Awards ==
- 2024 Overall winner Julia Margaret Cameron Awards
- 2023 American Photography 39
- 2022 PX3 finalist
- 2021 IPA Honorable Mention
- 2021 Paris Photo, Finalist
- 2020 Aesthetica Art Prize, Finalist
- 2020 Arte Laguna, Photographic section, Finalist
- 2019 Lucie Awards, Deeper Perspective, Honourable Mention
- 2019 Honourable Mention Julia Margaret Cameron Awards
- 2018 Arte Laguna, Belgium Residency Selection
- 2017 Black & White Spider Awards
- 2016 Sony Awards Short list
- 2016 Arte Laguna, Photographic Selection
- 2014 Prix Virginia, Paris, France Grand Prize
- 2013 International Color Awards, Fine Art Finalist
- 2012 The Big F Award, Framed Awards
- 2012 Selected for Art Basel
- 2011 Arte Laguna Special Prize Winner
- 2009 Popular Photography, reader's competition
- 2009 International Color Awards, Fine Art Finalist
- 2008 1st Place 'Magazine Cover Art', Applied Arts Magazine
- 2006 Nominee, 'David Screams', Black and White Spider Awards
- 2006 1st Place, 'Ice Cream', International Colour Awards
- 2004 1st Place, 'Hands', Applied Arts Magazine
- 2004 1st Place, 'Trackrecord Exhibit Poster' Applied Arts Magazine
- 2003 3rd Place, 'Trackrecord Exhibit Poster', Nikon PDN awards
- 2003 Top 10 Ice Cream Photo Life Magazine
- 2002 Nominee, 'Manifesto of Fun', Western Magazine Awards
- 2001 Nominee, 'Home Wrecked', Western Magazine Awards
- 1999 Nominee, 'Dig It', Western Magazine Awards

== Notable exhibitions ==
=== Solo and group exhibitions ===
2023

- Group, Studio Idan, Paris, France Le Corps Dans La Peau Curator: Luc Masson-Todeschini
- Solo, Studio Idan, Paris, France Unchanted Realities Curator: Idan Wizen

2020

- Solo, Museum of Jewish Montreal, Montreal, Canada Snapshots From The Garden Of Eden Curator: Alyssa Stokvis-Hauer
- Solo, Art Mur Gallery, Montreal, Canada Gods Of Suburbia Curator: Rheal Lanthier
- Solo, Castle of Compiano, Parma, Italy Fallen Princesses Curators: Opus in Artem
- Solo, Masterpiece Art, London, England. Modern Girl Curator: Alex Cousens
- Group, The Arts Company, Nashville, USA Dollhouse, Fallen Princesses Curator: Langley Burton
- Group, Aesthetica Art Prize, Future Now, York Gallery London, England. Princess, Snapshots From The Garden Of Eden Curator: Cherie Federico

2019

- Group, Musée de l'Homme, Paris, France. Alimentations: Nourritures/ Cultures/ Natures, The Last Supper, East Vancouver, 2014. Curators: Virginio Gaudenzi, Alexis Amen
- Group, Juming Museum, Taipei, Chance and Coincidence, Taiwan. Fallen Princesses Curator: Hung-Chih Wang
- Group, Pasinger Fabrik, Yes We Ken, Munich, Germany. In The Dollhouse Curators: Augusta Laar, Stefan-Maria Mittendorf
- Solo, Head On Photography Festival, Sydney, Australia. Gods Of Suburbia Curator: Moshe Rosenzveig

2018

- Solo, Addis Foto Festival, Addis Ababa, Ethiopia. Gods Of Suburbia, Curator: Aida Muluneh
- Solo, Museo della Padova Ebraica, Padua, Italy. Snapshots From The Garden Of Eden, Curator: Domenico Maria Papa
- Solo, Castello Cavour, Turin, Italy. Art Site Festival. Fallen Princesses. Curator: Domenico Maria Papa
- Solo, Venice Jewish Museum, Venice, Italy. Snapshots From The Garden Of Eden. Curator: Marcella Ansaldi
- Solo, Basilica of Sant'Ambrogio, Milan, Italy. Gods and Princesses Curator: Opus In Artem
- Group, Ian Potter Museum, University of Melbourne, Australia. 'All the better to see you with: Fairytales transformed' Curator: Samantha Comte

2017

- Festival, Lishui Biennial Photography Festival, Lishui Museum, China. Where Does The Future Get Made? Gods Of Suburbia. Curator: James Ramer
- Solo, Sidney and Gertrude Zack Gallery, Jewish Center, Vancouver, B.C. Snapshots From The Garden Of Eden. Curator: Linda Lando
- Group, Contemporary Jewish Museum, San Francisco, US. Jewish Folktales Retold: Artist as Maggid. Curators: Pierre-François Galpin, Renny Pritikin
- Festival, Contact Photography Festival, Toronto, Ont. Fallen Princesses. Curator: Belinda Chum Gallery House
- Festival, Auckland Festival Of Photography, Auckland, NZ. Gods Of Suburbia Curator: Shahidul Alam
- Group, Leaves from the Garden Of Eden: One Hundred Classic Jewish Tales, Contemporary Jewish Museum, San Francisco. "Curator: Pierre-François Galpin" → ·issou· ←

2016

- Festival, Daegu Photo Biennale, Daegu South Korea. Curator: Issack Kim
- Solo, Palazzo Flangini, Venice, Italy. Curator: Galleria Bianca Maria Rizzi
- Solo, Mesa Contemporary Arts Museum, Mesa, Arizona. Curator: Tiffany Fairall
- Group, Once Upon in A Fairy Tale, Mart Photography Centre Yekaterinberg, Russia. Curator: Artem Berkovich
- Solo, Dina Goldstein, Modern Girl, Virginie Barrou Planquart, Paris, France. Curator: Virginie Barrou Planquart
- Solo, Gods Of Suburbia, Capture Photo Festival, Vancouver. Curator: Kim Spencer-Nairn
- Group, The Girl Next Door, Haarlem, Holland
- Group, Palm Springs Fine Art Fair, Palm Springs, USA
- Solo, Collections, Central Dupon, Paris, France
- Festival, Gods Of Suburbia, Art Souterrain, Montreal, Quebec. Curator: Raymond Cantin
- Solo, In The Dollhouse, Rize Gallery, Amsterdam, Holland. Curator: Immechien Bonnet
- Solo, Gods Of Suburbia, Madison Gallery, CA, USA. Curator: Lorna York

2015

- Festival, Fallen Princesses, Rencontres Internationales de la Photographie En Gaspesie, Quebec, Canada. Curator: Claude Goulet.
- Solo, Fallen Princesses, Playtime Productions and Opiom Gallery- Public Exhibition, Mediathèque, Mouans-Sartoux, France. Curator: Hélène Girault
- Festival, In the Dollhouse, Fotografica Bogota Bianal- Photography Museum Colombia. Museum Director: Gilma Suárez

2014

- Solo, In the Dollhouse and Fallen Princesses, Prix Virginia Overall winner, Paris, France: Jury Curated Organizers: Marie Descourtieux and Sylvia Schildge
- Festival, Fallen Princesses, Rencontres Internationales De La Photographie En Gaspésie, Quebec, Canada Jury Curated: Festival Director, Claude Goulet
- Group, Gods Of Suburbia, Sakshi Gallery, Mumbai, India. Curator: Igor Zanti / Arte Laguna
- Catalogue Inclusion, In The Dollhouse, Musée d'Orsay Paris, France, Frida Kahlo and Diego Rivera Catalogue Curator: Marie-Paule Vial, Director. Musée de l'Orangerie
- Solo, XX, 20 Year Retrospective, Capture Photo Festival, Vancouver, British Columbia, Canada
- Festival, In The Dollhouse, Capture Photo Festival, Kimoto Gallery, Vancouver, British Columbia, Canada, Curator: Katsumi Kimoto
- Solo, In The Dollhouse, Art Mur Gallery, Montreal, Quebec, Canada Curator: Rheal Lanthier
- Group, Works On Paper, Papier 13, Montreal, Quebec, Canada Curator: Committee Papier 13
- Solo, Fallen Princesses, Musee Femme, Quebec Traveling exhibition, Curator: Marie-Eve Desautels
- Group, Fallen Princesses, Brigham Young University Museum of Art, We Could Be Heros, Utah, U.S.A. Curator: Jeff Lambson
- Group, Fallen Princesses, OUT / OFF - Mumbai, India Curator: Kanchi Mehta, Chameleon Art Projects
- Group, Fallen Princesses, Venice Arsenale, Arte Laguna, Venice, Italy, Curator: Igor Zanti
- Group, Fallen Princesses, Please Lie to Me, Art Mûr's 15th Anniversary

2010

- Festival, Fallen Princesses, Bielsko-Biala FotoArt Festival, Poland, Curator: Inez Baturo
- Solo, Fallen Princesses, Buschlen Mowatt Gallery, Vancouver, British Columbia, Canada, Curator: Barrie Mowatt

2005

- Solo, Trackrecord, Gallery L'Opera, 2004 Paris, France, Curator: Guy Berube

2004

- Solo, Trackrecord, Pendulum Gallery, Vancouver, B.C.

2003

- Group, David, Exposure Gallery, Vancouver, B.C. Curator: Ian McGuffie

2001

- Solo, Images of Gaza, Naamat Gallery, Tel Aviv, Israel Sidney and Gertrude Gallery, Vancouver, B.C

== Personal life ==
Goldstein lives in East Vancouver with her filmmaker husband, Jonas Quastel. She has two daughters, Jordan and Zoe.

== Articles and interviews ==
- Argument Magazine issue 07
- Talking Pictures interview August 2022
- Globe and Mail 2022- OG Punk
- Scout Magazine interview
- Stir Vancouver article
- Photobiz X Posed interview
- Phoblographer article
- 2020 The Guardian, The 10 Commandments
- DODHO MAGAZINE - The 10 Commandments
- Culture Trip interview
- The Sydney Morning Herald
- Arttribune
- KQED
- L'Oeil De La Photography
- DINA GOLDSTEIN: ANALYZING THE HUMAN CONDITION
- Dina Goldstein and Pop Surrealism
- China girl: Dina Goldstein's Satirical Pinups
- AI-AP: Profiles
- Dina Goldstein, Modern Girls
- The Times Of Israel
- NERDsociety Interview
- In The Dollhouse in Feature Shoot
- 2013 Moulot, Dora. Le Monde- France
- 2013 Sarno, Marco. La Repubblica- Italy
- 2013 Folie-Boivin, Émilie. Le Devoir- Canada
- Dark and Twisted Fairy Tales
