= Conach O'Shiel =

Sixteenth century Irish bishop

Conach O'Shiel (also recorded as Conat O'Siaghal) was an Irish bishop in the sixteenth century: he was appointed by Henry VIII in 1544 and died 1551.
