= Laurence Gillooly =

Irish Roman Catholic bishop

Laurence Gillooly CM
- Bishop of Elphin
- Church: Catholic Church
- Diocese: Diocese of Elphin
- In office: 1 December 1858 – 12 January 1895
- Predecessor: George Joseph Plunket Browne
- Successor: John Joseph Clancy
- Previous posts: Titular Bishop of Belline (1856-1858); Coadjutor Bishop of Elphin (1856-1858)

Orders
- Ordination: 6 December 1847
- Consecration: 7 September 1856 by William Delany

Personal details
- Born: 12 May 1819 Gallowstown (northwest of Roscommon), County Roscommon, United Kingdom of Great Britain and Ireland
- Died: 12 January 1895 (aged 75)

Laurence Gillooly CM (12 May 1819 – 12 January 1895) was an Irish Roman Catholic bishop who served as the Bishop of Elphin from 1858 to 1895. The son of Laurence Gillooly and his wife Margaret (née McGann), he was born at Bothair Garbh, Gallowstown, County Roscommon, near Roscommon Town. His older brother, Timothy, also became a priest.

Brought up an Irish Catholic, he was educated locally in Roscommon, and at St Nathy's College in Ballaghadereen. He studied at the Irish College in Paris before ordination as a Vincentian Priest in 1847. Favoured by Cardinal Cullen, his status as a ultramontanist helped him to obtain the position of bishopric of Elphin.

During Gillhooly's time in Elphin, he developed many churches, including the redevelopment of Sligo Cathedral. He founded Summerhill College (originally outside Athlone, now in Sligo) as a Diocesan College. Gillhooly Hall is named after him.

He was succeeded as Bishop of Elphin by John Joseph Clancy (bishop), a priest of the diocese and professor at Maynooth College.

Catholic Church titles
Preceded by George Joseph Plunket Browne	Bishop of Elphin; 1858–1895	Succeeded by John Joseph Clancy
