= Ciarán Ó Coigligh =

Irish a poet and retired academic (born 1952)

Dr Ciarán Ó Coigligh is an Irish a poet and retired academic.

Born in Dublin in 1952, Ó Coigligh studied at University College Dublin and Trinity College Dublin. He worked in the Modern Irish departments of NUI Galway and University College Dublin. He was a lecturer in Irish language, literature and civilisation in St. Patrick's College, Drumcondra. In 1999, as a lecturer in St. Patrick's College, Drumcondra, he became a member of Dublin City University's Academic Council.

In 2015, he became president of Newman College Ireland, a post he no longer holds.

Unlike most Irish language campaigners, Ó Coigligh has spoken out against an Irish Language Act in Northern Ireland and is vocal in his support for the Unionist DUP.

In June 2017, Dublin City University suspended Ó Coigligh's email account and condemned an email he had sent to all of the university's staff as "offensive". The email was about the death of a fellow staff member, Ann Louise Gilligan, the wife of Katherine Zappone, in which he described same-sex relationships as "a disorder" and stated that a sexual relationship between two women "cannot be conjugal, cannot be consummated, and cannot constitute marriage". The college stated, "While Dublin City University supports the concept that universities are fora where views from many different perspectives can be shared and debated respectfully, we do not condone communications that run counter to our policies and ethos of respect and dignity."

== Awards and prizes ==
- Arts Council Literary Bursary (1993)
- Travel and Training Award (2010)
- Colm Cille Prize at the Strokestown International Poetry Competition (2011)

== Publications ==
- An Troigh ar an Tairne
- Cion
- The Heritage of John Paul II
- An Fhilíocht chomhaimseartha, 1975-1985
- Duibhlinn
- Filíocht Ghaeilge: Phádraig Mhic Phiarais (editor) (Baile Átha Cliath: Clóchomhar, 1981)
