= Bishop of Elphin =

Roman Catholic episcopal title in Ireland

- Bishopric

catholic
- Coat of arms
- Incumbent; Kevin Doran since 14 May 2014
- Style: His grace

Location
- Country: Ireland

Information
- First holder: Domnall mac Flannacáin Ua Dubthaig
- Established: 1111
- Cathedral: Cathedral of St John the Baptist, Sligo

Website
- elphindiocese.ie

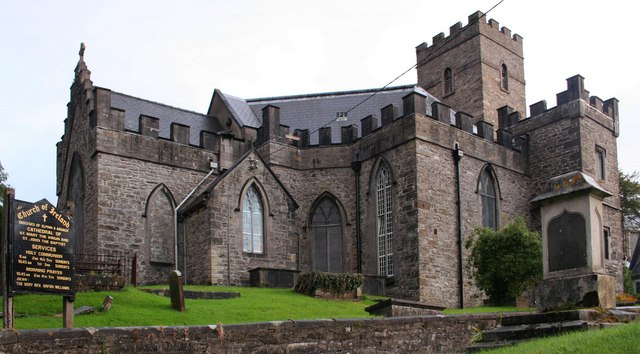
The Cathedral of St John the Baptist, Sligo, the episcopal seat of the Church of Ireland bishops of Elphin.

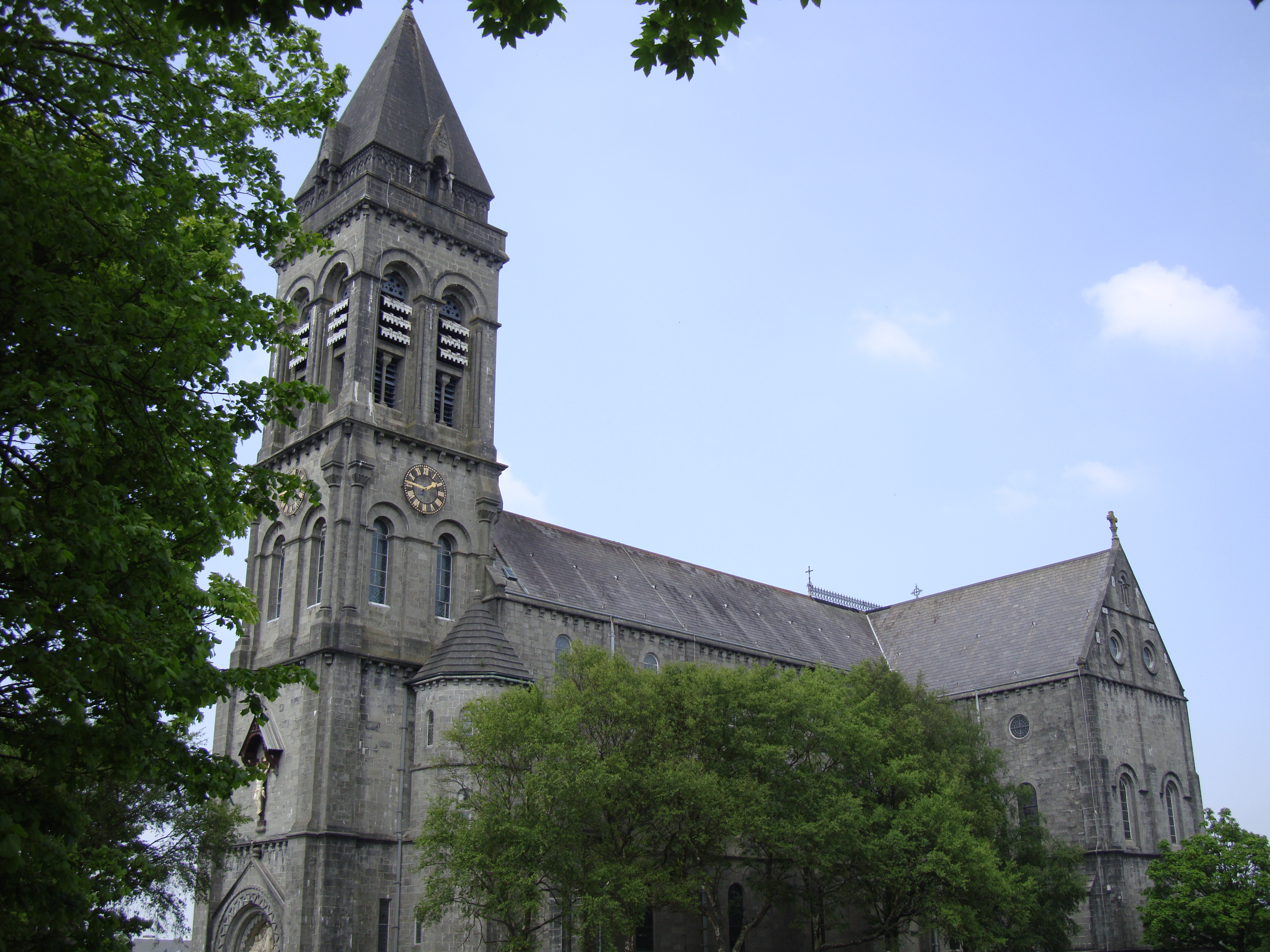
The Cathedral of the Immaculate Conception, Sligo, the episcopal seat of the Roman Catholic bishops of Elphin.

The Bishop of Elphin (el-FIN; Irish: Easpag Ail Finn) is an episcopal title which takes its name after the village of Elphin, County Roscommon, Ireland. In the Roman Catholic Church it remains a separate title, but in the Church of Ireland it has been united with other bishoprics.

== History ==
From the time Christianity first arrived in Ireland in the first half of the 5th century (in the form of Palladius's mission), the early church was centred around monastic settlements. Patrick founded such a settlement in an area known as Corcoghlan, now known as Elphin, in 434 or 435. Following the Synod of Rathbreasail in the year 1111, the Diocese of Elphin was formally established.

Following the Reformation of the 16th century and related turmoil, there were parallel apostolic successions.

In the Church of Ireland, the bishopric continued until 1841 when it combined with Kilmore and Ardagh to form the united bishopric of Kilmore, Elphin and Ardagh.

In the Roman Catholic Church, the title continues as a separate bishopric. The bishop's seat (cathedra) is located at the Cathedral Church of the Immaculate Conception in Sligo, Ireland. The current bishop, the Most Reverend Kevin Doran was appointed to the post by Pope Francis on 14 May 2014.

== Pre-Reformation bishops ==
List of Pre-Reformation Bishops of Elphin
From	Until	Ordinary	Notes
?1111	1136	Domnall mac Flannacáin Ua Dubthaig	Possibly became bishop of Elphin and Clonmacnoise at the Synod of Rathbreasail in 1111. Also was Abbot of Roscommon. Died in office on 17 March 1136.
unknown	bef. 1152	Flannacán Ua Dubthaig	Resigned before 1152 and died at Cong Abbey in 1168. He was remembered as a great scholar (ecnaid) and historian (senchaid). A genealogical section for the Síl Muiredaig in the Book of Ballymote (Minigud sencasa Síl Muiredaig) is attributed to him.
bef. 1152	1174	Máel Ísu Ua Connachtáin	Present at the Synod of Kells in 1152. Died in office.
unknown	1180	Tommaltach mac Áeda Ua Conchobair	Also known as Thomas. Translated to Armagh before February 1180.
c. 1180	1195	Floirint Ua Riacáin Uí Máelruanaid, O.Cist.	Formerly Abbot of Boyle. Became bishop c. 1180. Died in office.
1206	1215	Ardgar Ua Conchobair	Became bishop before 14 February 1206. Died in office.
fl. 1217/21	1229	Dionysius Ó Mórda	Known to be bishop around 1217 and 1221. Resigned in 1229 and died 15 December 1231.
c. 1230		Alanus	Archdeacon of Mayo. Became bishop c. 1230, but probably did not get possession of the see.
1231	1244	Donnchad mac Fíngein Ó Conchobhair	Also known as Dionysius and Donatus. Consecrated in 1231. Died in office on 24 April 1244.
1245	1246	Eóin Ó Mugróin	Also known as John O'Hugrain. Formerly Archdeacon of Elphin. Elected after 12 June 1244, appointed on 2 July 1245, and consecrated in the same year. Died in office in 1246.
1247	1259	Tomaltach mac Toirrdelbaig Ó Conchobhair	Also known as Thomas. Formerly Dean of Annaghdown. Elected before 21 August 1246 and consecrated on 21 January 1247. Translated to Tuam 23 March 1259.
1260	1262	Máel Sechlainn Ó Conchobair	Also known as Milo O'Connor. Formerly Archdeacon of Clonmacnoise. Elected before 30 January 1260 by the majority of the Chapter of Elphin, received possession of the temporalities on 8 November 1260, and consecrated c. November 1260. He was opposed by Tomas mac Fergail Mac Diarmata. Died in office on 9 January 1262.
1262	1265	Tomas mac Fergail Mac Diarmata, O.Cist.	Also known as Thomas Mac Ferrall McDermott. Elected before 26 January 1260 by the Dean of Elphin and others of the Chapter, but was not able to take possession of the see. He successfully appealed to the pope, but did not take possession of the temporalities until after the death of Bishop Máel Sechlainn Ó Conchobair in 1262. Died in office in 1265.
1266	1284	Muiris mac Néill Ó Conchobair, O.P.	Also known as Mauricius. Elected after 27 February 1266 and received possession of the temporalities after 23 April 1266. Died in office c. 5 December 1284.
1285		Amiaim Ó Tommaltaig (bishop-elect)	Elected and confirmed in 1285, but was never consecrated.
1285	1296	Gilla Ísu mac in Liathána Ó Conchobair, O.Praem.	Also known as Gelasius. Formerly Abbot of Loch Cé, near Boyle, County Roscommon. Elected on 10 August 1285 and received possession of the temporalities after 5 March 1285. Died in office before September 1296.
1297	1303	Máel Sechlainn mac Briain, O.Cist.	Also known as Malachias. Formerly Abbot of Boyle. Elected before 2 November 1296 and received possession of the temporalities on 7 September 1297. Died in office before March 1303.
1296	1297	Marianus Ó Donnabair, O.P.	Elected in September or October 1296. Died in office in 1297.
1303	1307	Donnchad Ó Flannacain, O.Cist.	Also known as Donatus. Formerly Abbot of Boyle. Elected before 28 June 1303 and received possession of the temporalities after 28 June 1303. Died in office on 22 June 1307.
1307	1310	Cathal Ó Conchobair, O.Praem.	Also known as Carolus. Formerly Abbot of Loch Cé, near Boyle, County Roscommon. Elected after 2 September 1307, consecrated c. October 1307, and received possession of the temporalities on 12 March 1309. Resigned in 1310 and died in 1343.
1310	1312	Máel Sechlainn Mac Áeda	Also known as Malachias. Formerly a canon of Elphin. Appointed on 22 June 1310 and received possession of the temporalities on 7 December 1310. Translated to Tuam on 19 December 1312.
1313	1326	Lúrint Ó Lachtnáin	Also known as Laurentius. Formerly a canon of Elphin. Appointed on 21 January 1313, consecrated after 19 February 1313, and received possession of the temporalities on 22 September 1314. Died in office in 1326.
1326	1354	Seoán Ó Fínnachta	Elected and consecrated in 1326, and received possession of the temporalities after 31 December 1326. Died in office in 1354.
c. 1355	1357	Carolus	Elected c. 1355. Deprived in 1357.
1357	1372	Gregorius Ó Mocháin	Formerly Provost of Killala. Appointed on 27 February 1357 and received possession of the temporalities on 26 June 1357. Translated to Tuam in 1372.
1372	1404	Thomas Barrett	Formerly Archdeacon of Annaghdown. Appointed on 16 June 1372 and received possession of the temporalities on 24 November 1372. Deprived by Pope Clement VIII on 17 January 1383, but without effect. Continued in office until his death in 1404.
1383		Seoán Ó Mocháin	Possibly a priest of the Diocese of Achonry. Appointed sometime between 17 January and 19 February 1383 by Pope Clement VII, but apparently did not take effect. Later appointed Bishop of Derry on 16 September 1394.
c. 1405		Gerald Caneton, O.S.A.	Translated from Cloyne c. 1405, but did not take effect.
1407	1417	Seaán Ó Gráda	Also known as John O'Grada. Appointed before 12 October 1407. Died in office in 1417.
1412	1414	Thomas Colby, O.Carm.	Appointed by Antipope John XXIII on 18 March 1412, in opposition to Seaán Ó Gráda, but did not take effect. Translated to Waterford and Lismore in February 1414.
1418	unknown	Robert Fosten, O.F.M.	Also known as Robert Forster. Appointed on 18 February 1418. Acted as a suffragan bishop in the Diocese of Durham (1426). Died in office after 1430
1421		Edmund Barrett	Also known as Éamonn 'mac an easbuig' Bairéad. Appointed in 1421 and died in the same year.
unknown	1429	Johannes	Deprived before 26 January 1429 and died before March 1434.
1429	1429	Laurentius Ó Beólláin	Formerly a canon of Elphin. Appointed on 26 January 1429. Died in office before December 1429.
1429	1449	William Ó hEidheáin	Appointed on 2 December 1429. Translated to Emly on 20 October 1449.
1449	1468	Conchobair Ó Maolalaidh, O.F.M.	Also known as Cornelius O'Mullaghlin. Translated from Emly on 20 October 1449. Died in 1468.
1458/69	1494	Nicol Ó Flannagáin, O.P.	Also known as Nicholas O'Flanagan. Appointed on 7 June 1458 and again 10 July 1469. Resigned in September 1494.
1487	?1495	Hugo Arward	Maybe also known as Aodh Mac an Bhaird. Appointed on 24 January 1487. Possibly died in 1495.
1492	unknown	Riocard mac Briain Ó gCuanach, O.P.	Appointed on 22 June 1492, but not known if took effect. Died after 1501.
1499	unknown	Georgios Vranas	Also known as Georgius de Brana, George Braua, or 'an-t-easbog Gréagach'. Translated from Dromore 15 April 1499. Resigned several years later, but the date not known. Died sometime between 18 August and 27 December 1529.
bef. 1501	unknown	Cornelius Ó Flannagain	Appointed before 1501, but not known if took effect.
1508	1511	Christopher Fisher	Appointed on 12 December 1508. Also Prebendary of Husthwaite, York (1507–11). Died in 1511.
aft. 1511	?1524	Thomas Walsh	Prior of Bradenstoke (1483–1524). He succeeded Fisher as prebendary of Husthwaite, York, and was likewise named by Erasmus as Bishop of Elphin. Died in 1524.
1525	1536	John Maxey, O.Praem.	Appointed on 7 April 1525. Acted as a suffragan bishop in the Diocese of York (1525). Also was Abbot of Welbeck (1520–36), Prebendary of Ampleforth, York (1528–36), and Abbot of Titchfield (c. 1535–36). Died in office on 15 August 1536.

== Post-Reformation bishops ==
=== Church of Ireland succession ===
List of Church of Ireland Bishops of Elphin
From	Until	Ordinary	Notes
1541	1551	Conach O'Shiel	Also surnamed as O'Shyagall or O'Negall. Nominated on 23 September 1541. Died in office before 28 July 1551.
1551	1580	Roland de Burgo	Also known as Roland Burke. Nominated on 23 November 1551 and appointed by letters patent 10 April 1552. Also was Bishop of Clonfert (1537–1580). Held possession of both sees until his death on 20 June 1580.
1580	1583	Thomas Chester	Nominated on 25 May 1582. Died in office.
1583	1611	John Lynch	Nominated on 4 November 1583. Resigned on 19 August 1611
1611	1639	Edward King	Nominated on 6 July 1611 and consecrated in December 1611. Died in office on 8 March 1639.
1639	1655	Henry Tilson	Formerly Dean of Christ Church, Dublin. Nominated on 7 August 1639 and consecrated on 23 September 1639. Died on office on 31 March 1655.
1655	1661	See vacant	
1661	1667	John Parker	Nominated on 6 August 1660 and consecrated on 27 January 1661. Translated to Tuam on 9 August 1667.
1667	1686	John Hodson	Formerly Dean of Clogher. Nominated on 17 July 1667 and consecrated on 8 September 1667. Died on office on 18 February 1686.
1686	1691	See vacant	
1691	1720	Simon Digby	Translated from Limerick, Ardfert and Aghadoe. Nominated on 4 December 1690 and appointed by letters patent on 12 January 1691. Died on office on 7 April 1720.
1720	1724	Henry Downes	Translated from Killala and Achonry. Nominated on 1 May 1720 and appointed by letters patent on 12 May 1720. Translated to Meath on 9 April 1724.
1724	1730	Theophilus Bolton	Translated from Clonfert and Kilmacduagh. Nominated on 18 March 1724 and appointed by letters patent on 16 April 1724. Translated to Cashel on 6 January 1730.
1730	1740	Robert Howard	Translated from Killala and Achonry. Nominated on 26 December 1729 and appointed by letters patent on 13 January 1730. Died in office on 3 April 1740.
1740	1762	Edward Synge	Translated from Ferns and Leighlin. Nominated on 30 April 1740 and appointed by letters patent 15 May 1740. Died on office on 27 January 1762.
1762	1772	William Gore	Translated from Clonfert and Kilmacduagh. Nominated on 21 April 1762 and appointed by letters patent on 3 May 1762. Translated to Limerick, Ardfert and Aghadoe on 5 March 1772.
1772	1775	Jemmett Browne	Translated from Cork and Ross. Nominated on 27 January 1772 and appointed by letters patent on 6 March 1772. Translated to Tuam on 11 April 1775.
1775	1795	Charles Dodgson	Translated from Ossory. Nominated on 23 March 1775 and appointed by letters patent on 12 April 1775. Died on office on 7 March 1795.
1795	1810	John Law	Translated from Killala and Achonry. Nominated on 11 March 1795 and appointed by letters patent on 27 March 1795. Died on office on 19 March 1810.
1810	1819	The Hon. Power Le Poer Trench	Translated from Waterford and Lismore. Nominated on 12 April 1810 and appointed by letters patent on 30 April 1810. Translated to Tuam on 10 November 1819.
1819	1854	John Powell Leslie	Translated from Dromore. Nominated on 16 November 1819. Became Bishop of Kilmore, Elphin and Ardagh on 15 October 1841 and died in office on 22 July 1854.
Since 1841		Part of the united Church of Ireland bishopric of Kilmore, Elphin and Ardagh.	

=== Roman Catholic succession ===
List of Roman Catholic Bishops of Elphin
From	Until	Ordinary	Notes
1539		William Magennis	Appointed on 16 June 1539. There is some confusion with this appointment; he may be Eugene Magennis, who was appointed Bishop of Down and Connor on the same day since nothing further is known of William Magennis.
1539	1541	Gabriel de S. Serio, O.S.B.	Appointed on 27 August 1539. Translated to Ferns on 3 June 1541.
1541	1542	Bernard O'Donnell, O.F.M.	Translated from Ferns on 3 June 1541. Died in office before 5 July 1542.
1542	1561	Bernard O'Higgins, O.E.S.A.	Appointed on 5 May 1542 and consecrated on 7 September 1542. He left Ireland in the later years of the reign of King Henry VIII and returned in the reign of Queen Mary I. Resigned in 1561 and died 1564.
1545	c. 1553/54	John O'Heyne (apostolic administrator)	Bishop of Cork and Cloyne (1540–1556). During the absence of Bishop O'Higgins, O'Heyne was appointed Apostolic Administrator of Elphin by papal brief on 20 February 1545. He ceased to administer the see of Elphin on the return of O'Higgins c. 1553–54.
1562	1594	Andrew O'Crean, O.P.	Appointed on 28 January 1562. Died in office in 1594.
1594	1620	See vacant	No record of vicars apostolic during this period.
1620	unknown	Nicholas a S. Patritio, O.E.S.A. (vicar apostolic)	An Augustinian friar, he was appointed vicar apostolic of Elphin by papal brief on 29 August 1620.
unknown	bef. 1625	Raymund Galvin	There is no record found of his appointment, but he was mentioned in the appointment of his successor, Boetius Egan, in 1625.
1625	1650	Boetius Egan, O.F.M.	Appointed on 9 June 1625 and consecrated in 1626. Died in office on 19 April 1650.
1650	1665	See vacant	
1665	1669	William Burgat (vicar apostolic)	Appointed vicar apostolic of Elphin on 24 November 1665. Also vicar apostolic of Emly (1657–1669) and Archbishop of Cashel (1669–1674).
1669	1671	See vacant	
1671	1703/04	Dominic de Burgo, O.P.	Also known as Dominic Burke. Appointed on 16 May 1671 (N.S.), papal brief issued on 13 July 1671 (N.S.), and consecrated on 22 November 1671 (N.S.). Died in office on 31 December 1703 or 1 January 1704.
1704	1707	See vacant	
1707	1717	Ambrose MacDermott, O.P.	Appointed on 21 March 1707 (N.S.), papal brief issued on 31 March 1707 (N.S.), and consecrated c. August 1707 (N.S.). Died in office in September 1717.
1718	1731	Gabriel O'Kelly	Also known as Carbry O'Kelly. Appointed by papal brief on 26 March 1718 (N.S.) and consecrated on 8 June 1718 (N.S). Died in office on 4 August 1731.
1731	1748	Patrick French, O.F.M.	Appointed by papal brief on 23 November 1731 (N.S.). Died in office before August 1748.
1748	1756	John Brett, O.P.	Translated from Killala. Appointed by papal brief on 28 August 1748 (N.S.). Died in office on 22 June 1756.
1756	1786	James O'Fallon	Appointed by papal brief on 4 August 1756. Died in office on 2 December 1786.
1787	1810	Edward French	Appointed by papal brief on 13 February 1787. Died in office on 29 April 1810.
1810	1814	See vacant	
1814	1827	George Thomas Plunkett	Appointed on 25 September 1814, papal brief issued on 4 October 1814, and consecrated 24 February 1815. Died in office on 8 May 1827.
1827	1843	Patrick Burke	Appointed coadjutor bishop of Elphin on 12 January 1819 and consecrated on 27 June 1819. Succeeded diocesan bishop on 8 May 1827. Died in office on 16 September 1843.
1844	1858	George Joseph Plunket Browne	Translated from Galway. Appointed on 10 March 1844 and papal brief issued on 26 March 1844. Died in office on 1 December 1858.
1858	1895	Laurence Gillooly C.M.	Appointed coadjutor bishop of Elphin by papal brief on 26 February 1856 and consecrated on 7 September 1856. Succeeded diocesan bishop on 1 December 1858. Died in office on 15 January 1895.
1895	1912	John Joseph Clancy	Appointed coadjutor bishop of Elphin on 12 January 1895, succeeded diocesan bishop on 8 February 1895, and consecrated on 24 March 1895. Died in office on 19 October 1912.
1913	1926	Bernard Coyne	Appointed on 18 January 1913 and consecrated 30 March 1913. Died in office on 17 July 1926.
1926	1950	Edward Doorly	Appointed coadjutor bishop of Elphin on 5 April 1923 and consecrated 24 June 1923. Succeeded diocesan bishop on 17 July 1926. Died in office on 5 April 1950.
1950	1970	Vincent Hanly	Appointed diocesan bishop on 19 July 1950 and consecrated 24 September 1950. Died in office on 9 November 1970.
1971	1994	Dominic Joseph Conway	Appointed an auxiliary bishop of Elphin on 16 October 1970 and consecrated on 8 November 1970. Appointed diocesan bishop of Elphin on 12 March 1971. Retired on 24 May 1994 and died on 22 August 1996.
1994	2014	Christopher Jones	Appointed on 24 May 1994 and consecrated on 15 August 1994. Retired on 14 May 2014 and died on 19 May 2018.
2014	present	Kevin Doran	Appointed on 14 May 2014 and consecrated on 14 July 2014.
