= Cathedral of the Immaculate Conception, Sligo =

Cathedral of the Immaculate Conception
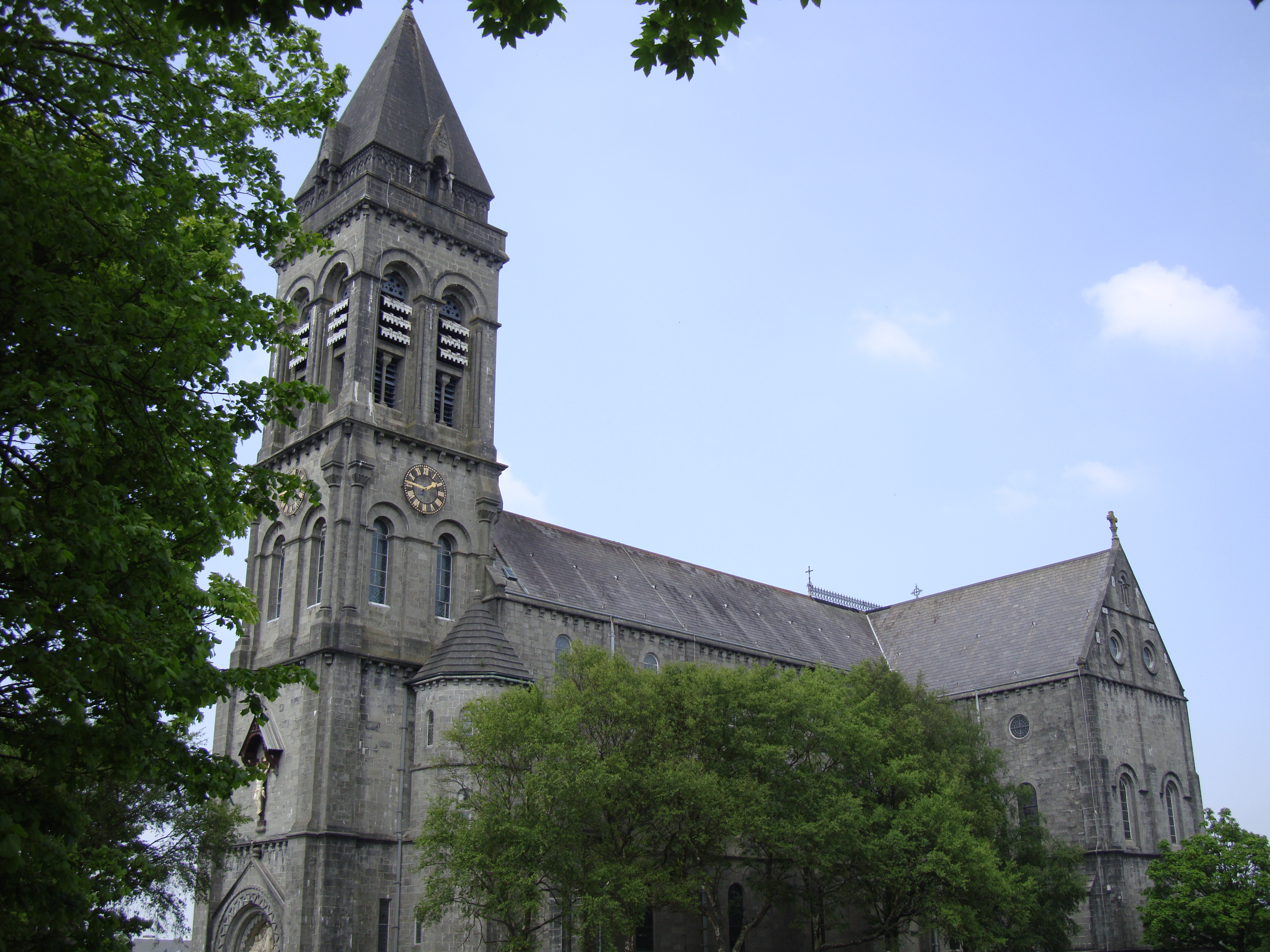
- Cathedral of the Immaculate Conception
- 54°16′12″N 8°28′42″W
- Location: Sligo, County Sligo
- Country: Ireland
- Denomination: Roman Catholic

History
- Consecrated: 1 July 1897

Architecture
- Style: Norman
- Completed: 26 July 1874

Administration
- Province: Tuam
- Archdiocese: Tuam
- Diocese: Elphin

Clergy
- Bishop: Kevin Doran
- Dean: Declan Boyce

The Cathedral of the Immaculate Conception is the cathedral church of the Roman Catholic Diocese of Elphin. It is located on Temple Street in Sligo, Ireland. The cathedral was developed by Bishop Laurence Gillooly who had been appointed Bishop of Elphin in 1858. He decided that the diocese was now of a size and wealth that the time had come to replace St. John's Parish Chapel, which had been recognised as the diocesan pro-cathedral.

He engaged George Goldie, one of the foremost Catholic architects in England in the nineteenth century. The cathedral was opened for divine worship on 26 July 1874 by Cardinal Paul Cullen of Dublin.

Modelled on a Normano–Romano–Byzantine style, it is the only example of a Romanesque style cathedral built during the 19th century. Designed in the shape of a basilica, the church has a square, pyramid-capped tower, which reaches a height of 70 metres, and supporting turrets at the west end. It can seat 1400 people. The circular baptistery incorporated in the apse with its five lancet windows behind the high altar, was originally designed as a mortuary chapel.

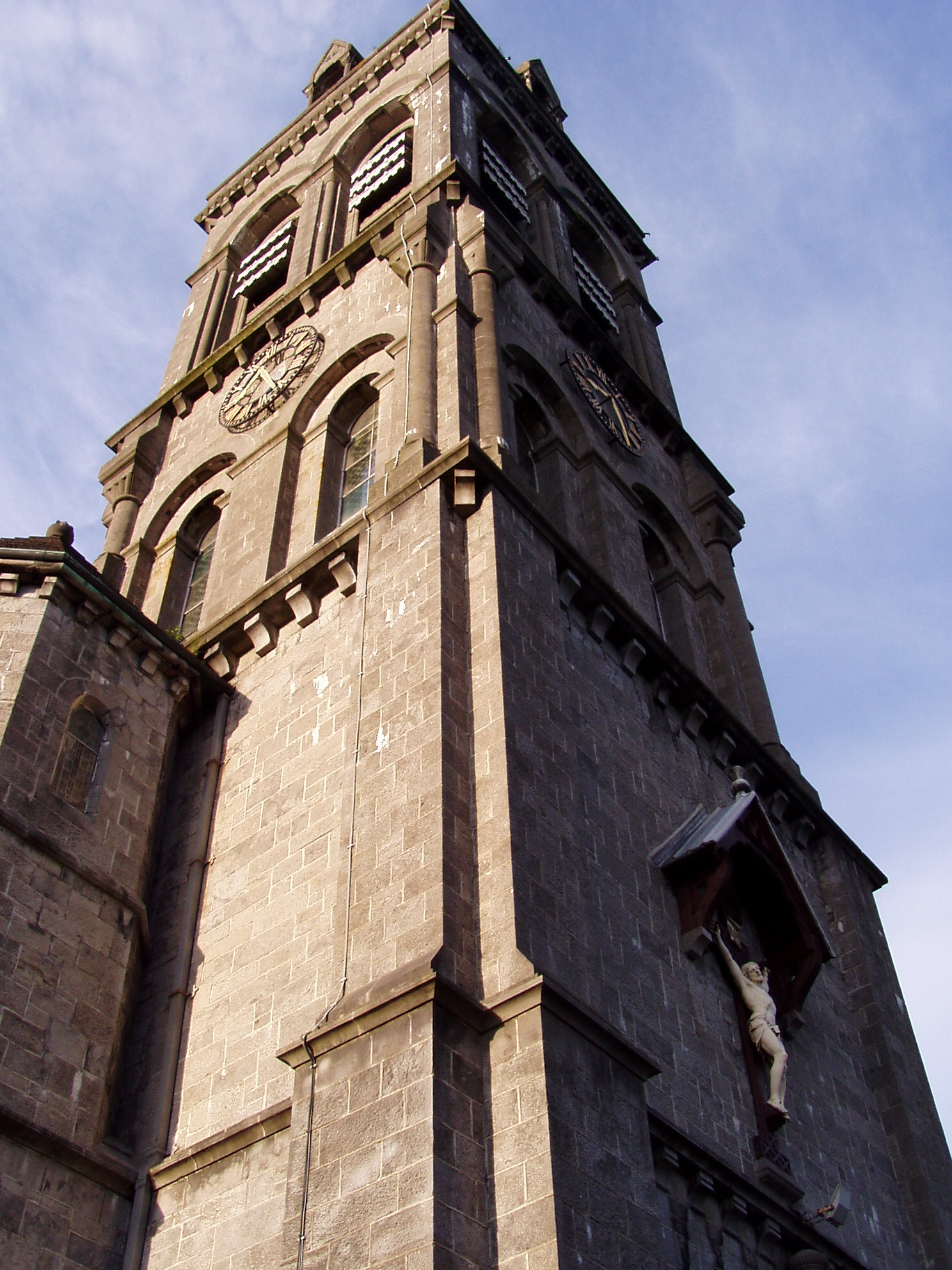
Tower

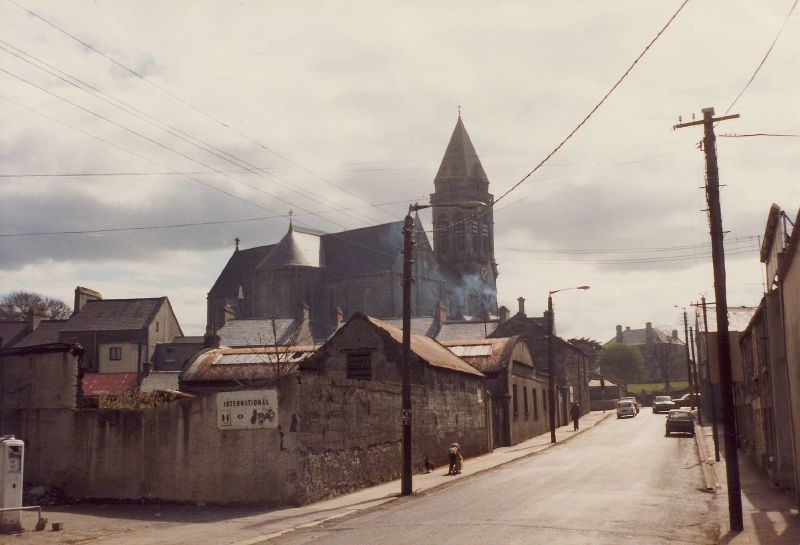
The cathedral

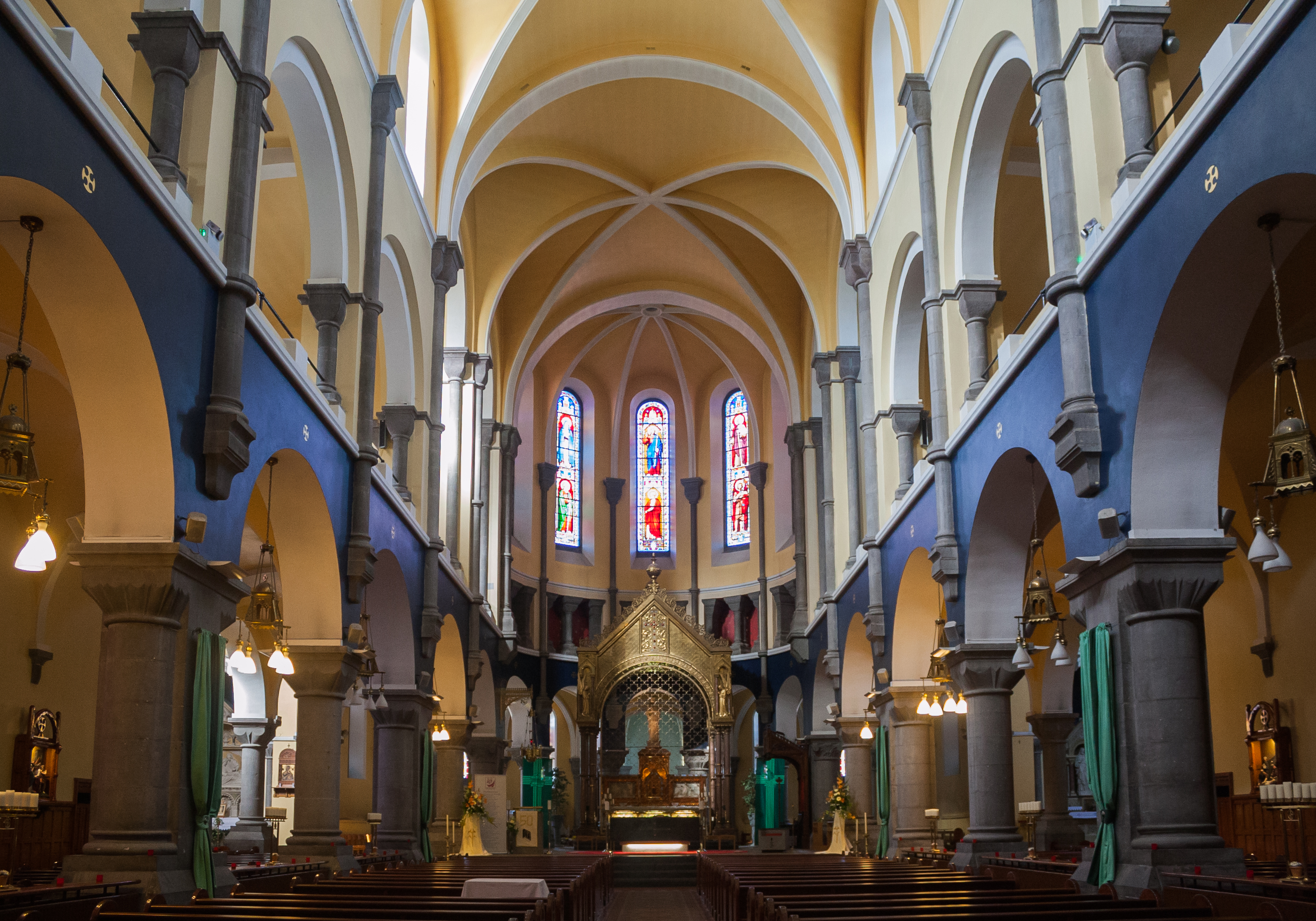
Interior of the cathedral, with the high altar
