= Kevin Doran =

Irish Roman Catholic prelate (born 1953)

The Most Reverend, Dr. Kevin Doran PhD
- Bishop of Elphin; Bishop of Achonry
- Church: Roman Catholic
- Diocese: Elphin; Achonry
- Appointed: 14 May 2014 (Elphin); 17 February 2025 (Achonry)
- Installed: 13 July 2014 (Elphin); 30 March 2025 (Achonry)
- Predecessor: Christopher Jones (Elphin); Paul Dempsey (Achonry)
- Previous posts: Apostolic administrator of Achonry; Administrator of the parish of the Church of the Sacred Heart, Donnybrook, Dublin; Secretary General of the Preparatory Committee of the 50th International Eucharistic Congress; Parish priest of St Kevin's parish, Glendalough; Lecturer at Mater Dei Institute of Education and Milltown Institute of Theology and Philosophy; Director of Vocations and Director for the Permanent Diaconate for the Archdiocese of Dublin; Spiritual director at the Pontifical Irish College; Chaplain at University College Dublin; Catechist and Chaplain at Ringsend Technical Institute

Orders
- Ordination: 6 July 1977 by Patrick Dunne
- Consecration: 13 July 2014 by Christopher Jones

Personal details
- Born: 26 June 1953 (age 73) Dún Laoghaire, County Dublin, Ireland
- Parents: Joseph and Marie Doran
- Education: Pontifical Gregorian University; Pontifical Irish College; University College Dublin; Holy Cross College
- Motto: Unum corpus in Christo (One body in Christ)
- Coat of arms

Styles of Kevin Doran
- Reference style: The Most Reverend
- Spoken style: Your Grace
- Religious style: Bishop

Kevin Peter Doran (born 26 June 1953) is an Irish Roman Catholic prelate, bioethicist and theologian who has served as Bishop of Elphin since 2014 and Bishop of Achonry since 2025.

== Early life and education ==
Doran was born in Dún Laoghaire, County Dublin on 26 June 1953, one of three children to Joseph Doran and his wife Marie (née Brady).

He attended primary and secondary school at C.B.C. Monkstown, where his father worked as a teacher. Doran studied for the priesthood at Holy Cross College between 1970 and 1974, completing a Bachelor of Arts in philosophy and French at University College Dublin, and at the Pontifical Irish College, Rome, between 1974 and 1977, completing a Bachelor of Sacred Theology at the Pontifical Gregorian University.

He was ordained a priest for the Archdiocese of Dublin on 6 July 1977.

== Presbyteral ministry ==
Following ordination, Doran received his first diocesan assignment as catechist and chaplain at Ringsend Technical Institute, during which time he also completed a higher diploma in education at University College Dublin. He subsequently served as an advisor for VEC schools in the diocesan secretariat for education, and as an occasional lecturer in midwifery ethics at the Coombe Women's Hospital.

Doran returned to University College Dublin in 1983, where he was appointed university chaplain until 1990. It was during this time that he completed a Master of Arts in philosophy between 1985 and 1987. He subsequently returned to the Pontifical Irish College in 1990, where he was appointed spiritual director, during which time he also completed a Doctor of Philosophy in philosophical anthropology, with specific focus on the philosophy of Pope John Paul II, at the Pontifical University of Saint Thomas Aquinas.

Doran returned to the Archdiocese of Dublin in 1995, where he received his first pastoral assignment as curate in Our Lady of Perpetual Succour parish, Foxrock. During this assignment, he was also a lecturer in philosophy and Catholic social teaching at Mater Dei Institute of Education and occasional lecturer in midwifery ethics at the National Maternity Hospital.

Doran was appointed parish chaplain to St Anthony's parish, Clontarf, and diocesan vocations director in 1998. He was subsequently appointed national vocations co-ordinator for the Irish Catholic Bishops' Conference in 2000 and a lecturer in philosophy and Catholic social teaching at Milltown Institute of Theology and Philosophy. Doran was subsequently appointed parish priest in St Kevin's parish, Glendalough in 2005, and four years later as parish chaplain to St Vincent de Paul parish, Marino.

He was appointed diocesan director for the permanent diaconate in 2008 and administrator of Sacred Heart parish, Donnybrook, five years later.

Doran also served as secretary general of the Preparatory Committee of the 50th International Eucharistic Congress between 2008 and 2012. He also served on numerous governing bodies, including the Mater Misericordiae University Hospital, from which he resigned in October 2013 after hospital management confirmed its intention to comply with the Protection of Life during Pregnancy Act.

== Episcopal ministry ==
=== Bishop of Elphin ===
Doran was appointed Bishop-elect of Elphin by Pope Francis on 14 May 2014. He confessed his surprise at his appointment, saying:

"Two weeks ago, we finalised a development plan for [Donnybrook] parish, and that was the only plan I had in mind for the foreseeable future. I have learnt over the years, however, that vocation is never static."

He was consecrated by his predecessor, Christopher Jones, on 13 July in the Cathedral of the Immaculate Conception, Sligo.

It was reported in February 2017 that Doran had reached an agreement for a new community of religious sisters to establish a house in his diocese. The community, who are members of the Servant Sisters of the Home of the Mother congregation, settled in Sacred Heart parish, Roscommon.

Speaking at Knock Shrine on 21 August 2022, Doran stated that even though “there are some who quite comfortably think of themselves as worthy, while judging others to be unworthy", the Eucharist should be made available to all who wish to receive it. He also received praise from former President of Ireland Mary McAleese for his contribution to the synod on synodality in Ireland, with special reference to the LBGTI+ focus group in his diocese – which prepared its own report in parallel to the report prepared by the diocese – whose "powerful voice drew particular attention in the national synthesis document". McAleese also congratulated Doran for his integrity in publishing that focus group report in its entirety, as agreed with its participants, and for ensuring it would go to Rome as written, describing his actions as "courageous in the extreme".

==== Apostolic Administrator of Achonry ====
In response to a wider reorganisation of diocesan church leadership in the ecclesiastical province of Tuam, and following the appointment of the Bishop of Achonry, Paul Dempsey, as Auxiliary Bishop of Dublin, Doran was appointed apostolic administrator sede vacante of Achonry on 10 April 2024.

=== Bishop of Achonry ===
Following the simultaneous announcement by Pope Francis that the Dioceses of Elphin and Achonry would be united in persona episcopi, Doran was appointed Bishop-elect of Achonry in addition to his appointment as Bishop of Elphin on 16 February 2025.

He was installed on 30 March in the Cathedral of the Annunciation of the Blessed Virgin Mary and St Nathy, Ballaghaderreen.

== Controversies ==
=== Marriage and parenthood ===
In December 2004, Doran urged Catholics to consider the appropriateness of participating in or attending a register office marriage. Writing in Alive!, he said Catholics needed to consider if this was "in conflict with the truth" and said "This would be particularly important for someone who is asked to act in a formal capacity as a witness".

On 24 February 2015, in advance of a referendum on permitting civil marriage for same-sex couples, Doran said

"The reality is that those who wish to change the Constitution are not actually looking for marriage equality. They are looking for a different kind of relationship which would be called marriage; a relationship which includes some elements of marriage, such as love and commitment, but excludes one of the two essential aspects of marriage, which is the openness of their sexual relationship to procreation. This is only possible if we change the meaning of marriage and remove that aspect of openness to procreation."

Speaking on Newstalk Breakfast on 9 March, Doran differentiated between marriage and same-sex relationships, saying that "[one] [...] is of its very nature, directed towards the upbringing, the care of children, and one [...] isn't and they can't be said to be the same", that gay and lesbian couples who have children are "not parents" and that some "people who have children are not necessarily parents'.

When asked in the same interview whether homosexuality was what God intended, Doran said that "That would be to suggest if some people who are born with Down syndrome or spina bifida, that that was what God intended either".

The Archbishop of Dublin, Diarmuid Martin, described Doran's choice of words as "an unfortunate phrase" and hoped that offence had not been caused. Doran later expressed his regret over the hurt experienced by people, either due to his choice of words or to the manner in which what he said had been subsequently reported. Following this event, the Archbishop declined to comment on whether or not Martin had retained his confidence. Doran expressed regret days later saying he was “conscious that whatever the situation, some people were hurt by either what I said or what they thought I had said and I very much regret that”.

=== Abortion ===
In 2013, while a member of the Mater Hospital board, Doran said the hospital "can't carry out abortions because it goes against our ethos". As an institution listed in the Protection of Life During Pregnancy Act, the hospital was obliged to carry out or assist with terminations where the life of a pregnant woman was in danger. A spokesperson for Department of Health replied to say that the Act "does not provide for conscientious objection by institutions" and consciousness objections related solely to the rights of the "persons involved in the delivery of the treatment only". In the case of an immediate risk to the life of a pregnant woman, the health professional has a "duty to ensure that another colleague takes over the care of the patient as per current medical ethics'.

Speaking on Newstalk Breakfast on 9 March 2015, Doran caused controversy by suggesting that rape victims seek abortions to "get back" at their perpetrators:

"Objectively speaking, to kill another human being is always sinful. The child is still a human being, you don’t destroy a life in order to get back at the mother’s rapist."

Following the passing of a referendum on liberalising abortion laws on 25 May 2018, he encouraged Catholics who voted Yes in the referendum to repent. While he believed those who voted in favour of the motion knowing abortion would be the outcome had committed “a sin”, Doran also stated that any decision by Catholics who voted yes to receive Communion was "a matter for their own personal conscience".

=== Contraception ===
At an event commemorating the 50th anniversary of the papal encyclical Humanae vitae in August 2018, Doran claimed "the fact that [women who use contraception] are less likely to become pregnant also takes away from women one of the principle motives or freedoms for saying no to unwanted sex", stating that "there is a very direct connection between the contraceptive mentality and the surprisingly high number of people who seem ready to redefine marriage today as a relationship between two people without distinction as to sex".

The then-Minister for Health, Simon Harris, tweeted in response:

"Please just make it stop! Increasing access to & availability of contraception is and will remain public health policy. Religion plays an important role for many on an individual basis – but it will not determine health and social policy in our country any more. Please get that."

=== COVID-19 ===
In an article for The Irish Catholic in January 2021, Doran warned that lives would be lost if significant numbers refused to take the COVID-19 vaccine. One of the most outspoken pro-life voices in the Catholic Church in Ireland, he insisted that "[vaccination], as an aspect of preventive medicine, is recognised and encouraged by the Catholic Church as an essential element of the mission of healthcare professionals".

In July 2021, Doran defied government advice by advising priests in the Diocese of Elphin to proceed with celebrating the sacraments of First Communion and Confirmation. In an article for the Irish Independent on 30 July, he opined that the mission of the church could not be put on hold indefinitely. This prompted a response from the then-Taoiseach, Michéal Martin, who questioned whether it was "too much to ask" for adherence to public health advice, adding that he didn't "approve of any unilateral breaching of regulations no matter what quarter they come from".

=== Assisted suicide ===
Doran was reported to have had his Twitter account temporarily restricted on 22 February 2021, after he Tweeted on 31 January his opposition to efforts to legalise assisted suicide in Ireland. However, by 23 February, the Tweet was restored and restrictions on Doran's account were removed.

Kevin Doran
(@KevinElphin)
tweeted:

There is dignity in dying. As a priest, I am privileged to witness it often. Assisted suicide, where it is practiced, is not an expression of freedom or dignity, but of the failure of a society to accompany people on their “way of the cross”

31 January 2021

== Bibliography ==
- Doran, Kevin (1988). More Joy in Heaven: The Sacrament of Reconciliation. Dublin: Veritas. ISBN 9781853900013.
- Doran, Kevin (1989). What Is a Person?: The Concept and the Implications for Ethics (Problems in Contemporary Philosophy). New York: Edwin Mellen Press. ISBN 9780889461406.
- Doran, Kevin P. (1996). Solidarity: a synthesis of personalism and communalism in the thought of Karol Wojtyla / Pope John Paul II. New York: Peter Lang. ISBN 9780820430713.
