= Summerhill College =

Coordinates: 54.266947°N 8.47938°W

- Coláiste Cnoic an tSamhraidh
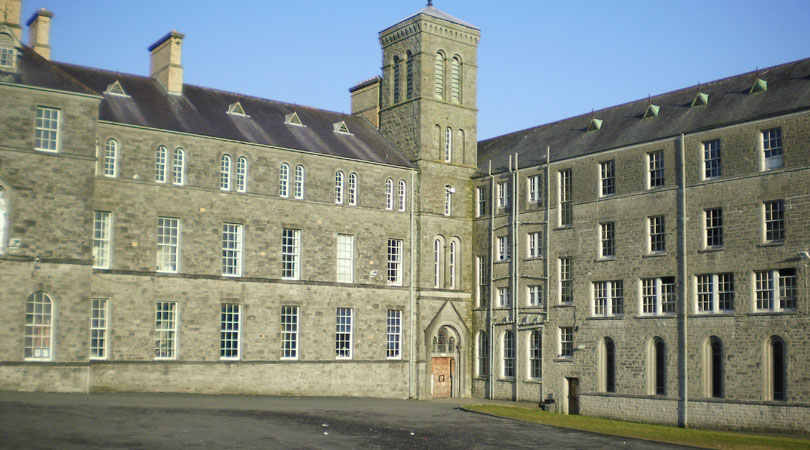

Location
- College Road; Sligo, County Sligo; Ireland

Information
- Type: Voluntary secondary school
- Motto: Estote Factores Verbi
- Established: 1857
- Founder: Laurence Gillooly
- Patron: Kevin Doran
- Principal: Paul Keogh
- Teaching staff: 82
- Gender: Mixed
- Enrollment: 1062
- Colours: navy blue, light blue
- Athletics: soccer, Gaelic games, rugby union, athletics, basketball, swimming, surfing
- Nickname: Boys in Blue, The Hill
- Website: http://www.summerhillcollege.ie
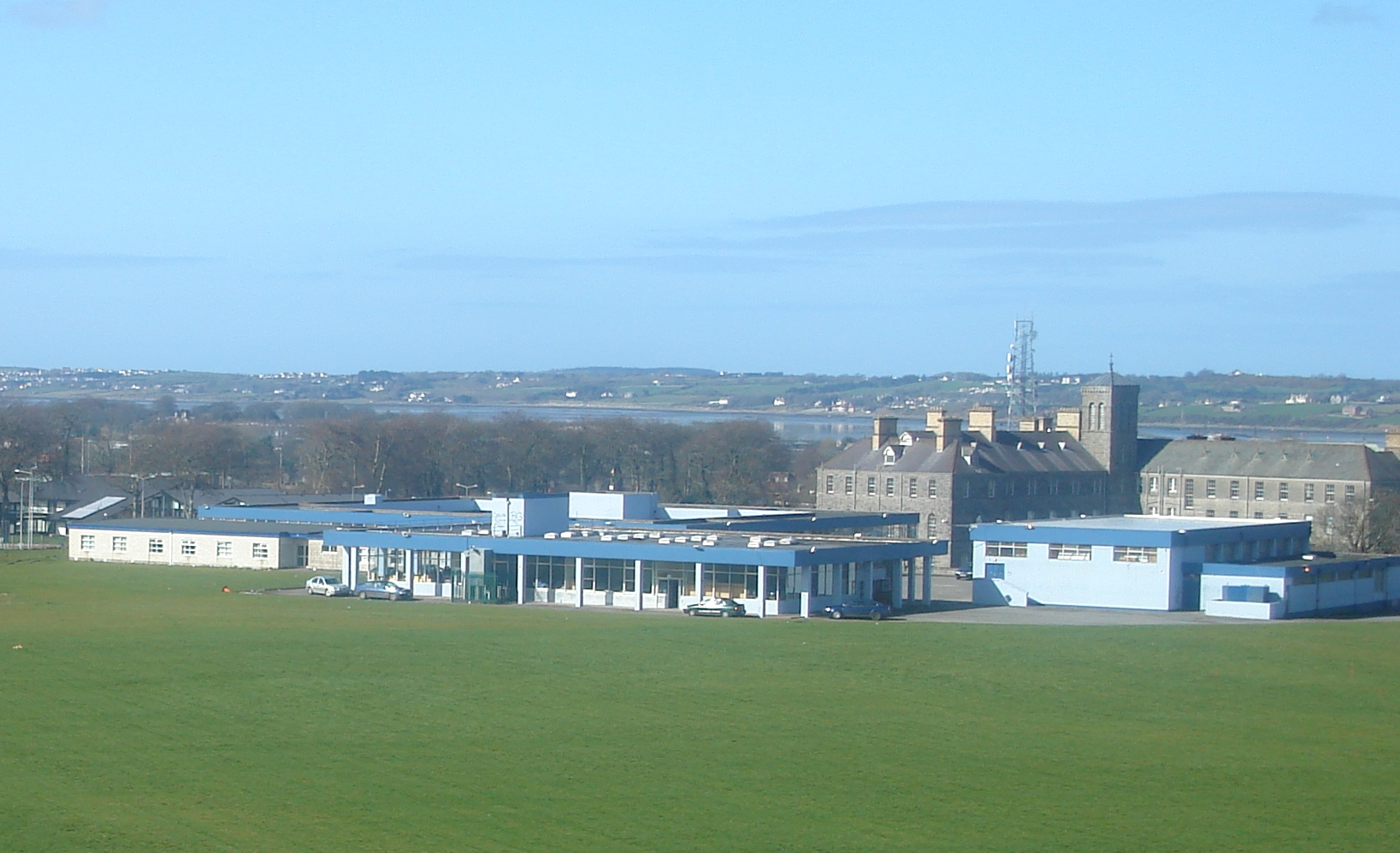
- The old buildings of Summerhill College (now replaced by a new building programme)

Summerhill College (aka The College of the Immaculate Conception) is a Roman Catholic voluntary secondary school located in the town of Sligo in north-west Ireland.

== History ==
The school was founded in 1857 by then-bishop of Elphin, Laurence Gillooly, in Summerhill, Athlone, County Roscommon (present-day County Westmeath). It moved to temporary accommodation in Sligo in 1880 (Quay Street) and to a new school building (the present site) in 1892. Although the official name of the school is the College of the Immaculate Conception, it has always been known locally as Summerhill or Summerhill College.

The college has been a diocesan college — historically an entry school for those wishing to train as priests for the Catholic diocese of Elphin. The college took in both boarders and day boys until the dormitories were closed in the 1980s due to economic circumstances.

== Curriculum ==
The school offers the traditional Junior and Leaving Certificate cycles to its pupils. It also provides other options such as Junior Certificate School Programme (JCSP), Transition Year, Leaving Certificate Vocational Programme (LCVP) and Leaving Certificate Applied (LCA).

== Extra-curricular activities, clubs and sport ==
Summerhill College offers many sports to its students, including Gaelic football, soccer, rugby union, basketball, athletics, kayaking, sailing and surfing.

== Notable staff ==
Cyril Haran taught English at the school and was known as "Cyrilly" or "Dosser".

== Presidents/principals of Summerhill College ==
=== 19th century ===
John Lyster, later bishop of Achonry

=== 20th century ===
- Thomas Finnegan (1966–1979), served as bishop of Killala
- Austin McKeon (1987–1990)
- Kevin Earley (1990–1999)

=== 21st century ===
- Thomas McManus (2009–2014)
- Paul Keogh (2014–present)

== Selected past pupils ==
Some of Summerhill's more well-known alumni:

- Tabby Callaghan (b. 1981) — singer, finalist on The X Factor
- John Caulfield — football coach and former player, manager of Galway United
- Kian Egan, Mark Feehily and Shane Filan — three of the four members of boy band Westlife
- Edward J. Flanagan (1886–1948) — founder of Boys Town orphanages in the US (the old gym in the school was named "Fr. Flanagan Hall" after him)
- Tommie Gorman (1956–2024) — Northern Ireland correspondent with Irish state broadcaster RTÉ
- Chris MacManus (b. 1973) — Former Sinn Féin MEP for Midlands–North-West
- Ray MacSharry (b. 1938) — former Fianna Fáil TD, Tánaiste and European Commissioner
- Dermot Mannion (b. 1958) — former CEO of Aer Lingus
- John McCormack (1884–1945) — world-famous tenor
- Paul McGee (b. 1954) — former Republic of Ireland soccer international player
- Conán O'Donnell (b. 1996) — rugby player
- Patrick O'Dowd (1892–1968) — Fianna Fáil TD (Roscommon) and medical practitioner
- Michael O'Flanagan (1876–1942) — Irish Republican and Roman Catholic priest
- Albert Reynolds (1932–2014) — Fianna Fáil TD and Taoiseach
- Mark Scanlon (b. 1980) — professional cyclist, former World Junior Cycling Champion

== New school building programme ==
In January 2006 it was announced that Summerhill was to get €20 million funding for a new school building. Work was due to begin in 2008, but the Department of Education said later that same year that "the project will not be progressed further this year". However, work finally began on the demolition of the 1970s building and construction of a new school in the summer of 2011. The new three-storey building opened its doors to new students in August 2012 at a reduced cost of €12.5M. There are over 40 new classrooms in the new building, with a new gym and hardcourt playing pitches opened in November 2012.

== Controversies ==
The school received a damning report from the Department of Education in May 2010. The principal at the time of this inspection was Michael Murphy.

In February 2013 a trial in Sligo Circuit Court heard of alleged improper use of Department of Education funds by former school staff during 2008–09.

== See also ==
- Education in the Republic of Ireland
