= Roman Catholic Diocese of Elphin =

Catholic diocese in Ireland

Coordinates: 54.2699°N 8.4786°W

Diocese of Elphin Dioecesis Elphinensis Deoise Ail Finn

Catholic
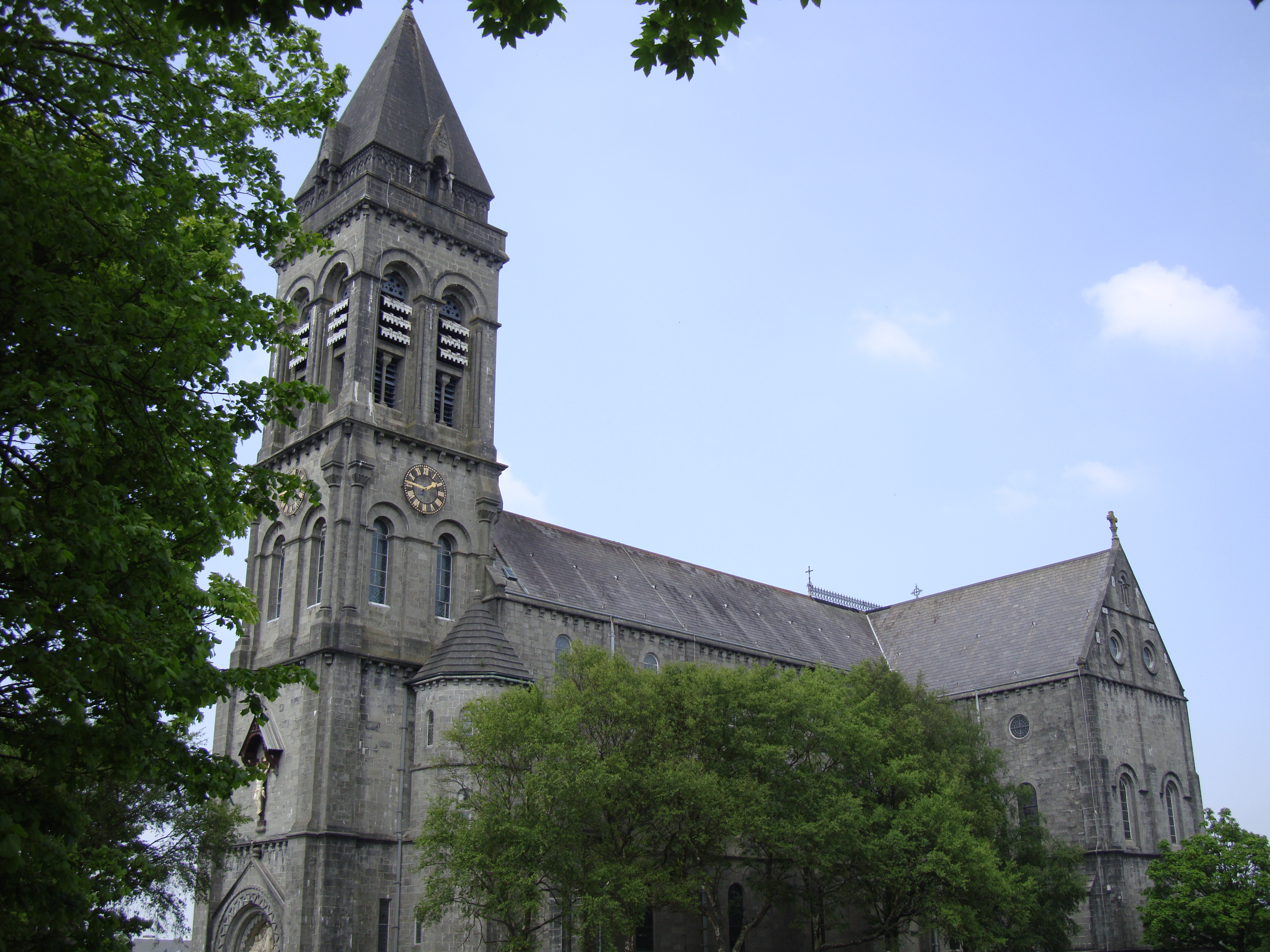

Location
- Country: Ireland
- Territory: Parts of counties Roscommon, Sligo, Westmeath and Galway
- Ecclesiastical province: Province of Tuam
- Metropolitan: Archdiocese of Tuam

Statistics
- Area: 1,201 sq mi (3,110 km^{2})
- Population: Total; Catholics: 70,000; 68,000
- Parishes: 37

Information
- Denomination: Catholic
- Sui iuris church: Latin Church
- Rite: Roman Rite
- Established: Diocese in 1111
- Cathedral: Cathedral of the Immaculate Conception, Sligo
- Patron saint: St Ascius and the Immaculate Conception

Current leadership
- Pope: Leo XIV
- Bishop: Kevin Doran; Bishop of Elphin
- Metropolitan Archbishop: Francis Duffy; Archbishop of Tuam
- Vicar General: Canons Tom Hever & Liam Devine

Map
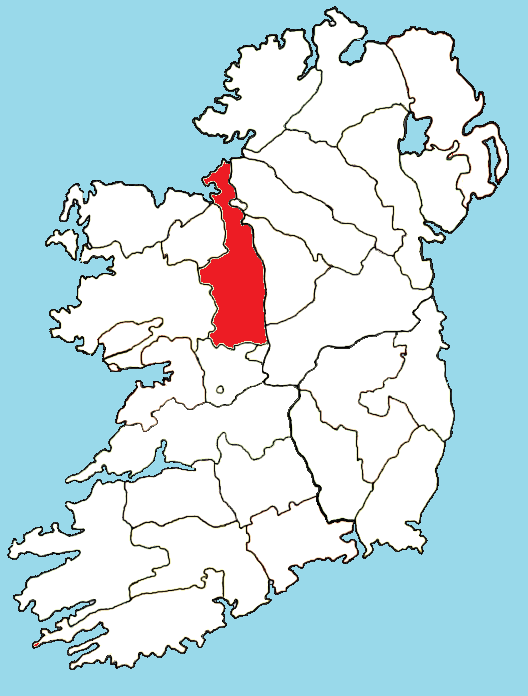

Website
- elphindiocese.ie

The Diocese of Elphin (el-FIN; Irish: Deoise Ail Finn) is a Latin Church diocese of the Catholic Church in the western part of Ireland. It is in the Metropolitan Province of Tuam and is subject to the Metropolitan Archdiocese of Tuam. The current bishop is Kevin Doran who was appointed in 2014.

== Geographical remit ==
The diocese covers parts of the counties of Roscommon, Sligo and Galway, and Westmeath. Its Cathedral, which was originally established in the Roscommon town of Elphin, is now in Sligo. The major towns are Athlone, Boyle, Castlerea, Roscommon and Sligo.

== History ==
The See dates to the earliest days of the Irish Church. From the time Christianity first arrived in Ireland in the second half of the 5th century (in the form of Saint Patrick's mission), the early church was centred on Monastic settlements. St. Patrick founded such a settlement in an area known as Corcoghlan, now known as Elphin, in 434 or 435. The first Abbot bishop of this monastic settlement was Assicus, who was said to be St. Patrick's silversmith or coppersmith. Saint Assicus is now the patron of the diocese. Following the Synod of Rathbreasail in 1111 the diocese was formally recognised. The cathedral established here was dedicated to Beatae Mariae Virgini (Blessed Mary the Virgin).

Following the English Reformation of the 16th century, the cathedral and many monasteries and convents were destroyed. It wasn't until 1874 that the then bishop, Laurence Gillooly, decided to rebuild the cathedral, this time in Sligo town. This cathedral was dedicated to The Immaculate Conception. Just under 20 years later, in 1892, Bishop Gillooly supervised the building of a College dedicated to training boys for the priesthood, known as the College of the Immaculate Conception. This school still operates today, as Summerhill College.

In recent years the Diocese has run the Maryvale Institute course in catechism as part of it faith development programmes.

== Diocesesan governance ==
There are currently thirty-seven parishes in the diocese, which are divided into 6 administrative deaneries, based in the towns of Sligo, Boyle, Strokestown, Castlerea, Roscommon and the part of Athlone west of the River Shannon. There are currently 108 priests, ministering to a population of approximately 70,000, of whom 97% (68,000) are Roman Catholic.

== Parishes ==
The following are the parishes of the Diocese of Elphin:

Ahamlish-innismurray (Grange and Cliffoney)

Ahascragh (Ahascragh and Caltra)

Ardcarne (Cootehall)

Athleague (Athleague and Fuerty)

Athlone, Ss Peter and Paul's

Aughanagh (Ballinafad)

Aughrim (Aughrim and Kilmore)

Ballinameen (Kilnamanagh and Estersnow)

Ballintubber (Ballintober and Ballymoe)

Ballyforan-dysart-tisrara

Ballygar (Killian and Killeroran)

Boyle

Castlerea (Kilkeevan)

Croghan (Killukin and Killummod)

Drumcliff & Maugherow

Elphin (Elphin and Creeve)

Fairymount (Tibohine)

Frenchpark (Kilcorkey and Frenchpark)

Geevagh

Kilbegnet (Glinsk and Creggs)

Kilbride (Fourmilehouse)

Kilgefin (Ballagh, Cloontuskert and Curraghroe)

Kilglass (Kilglass and Rooskey)

Kiltoom (Kiltoom and Cam)

Knockcroghery / St. John's / Rahara

Loughglynn (Loughglynn, Lisacul and Gorthaganny)

Oran (Cloverhill)

Riverstown

Roscommon

Rosses Point

Sligo, St Anne's & Carraroe

Sligo, St Joseph's & Calry

Sligo, St Mary's (Cathedral parish)

Strandhill/Ransboro

Strokestown (Kiltrustan, Lissonuffy and Cloonfinlough)

Tarmonbarry

Tulsk (Ogulla and Baslic)

== See also ==
- Catholic Church in Ireland
- Diocese of Kilmore, Elphin and Ardagh (Church of Ireland)
