= John Armstrong =

John Armstrong may refer to:

== Politicians ==
- John Alexander Macdonald Armstrong (1877–1926), Canadian politician
- John Armstrong (Australian politician) (1908–1977)
- John Armstrong (New Zealand politician) (1935–2018)
- John Armstrong Jr. (1758–1843), soldier and U.S. Secretary of War
- John Armstrong Sr. (1717–1795), American general and Continental Congressman
- John Armstrong (Wisconsin pioneer) (1814–1887)
- John Franklin Armstrong (1819–1887), schoolteacher and Texas state representative
- John Armstrong (Irish politician), MP for Fore

== Religion ==
- John Armstrong (archbishop of Armagh) (1915–1987), Anglican bishop
- John Armstrong (bishop of Grahamstown) (1813–1856), Anglican bishop
- John Armstrong (bishop of Bermuda) (1905–1992), Anglican bishop
- John Armstrong (dean of Kilfenora) (1792–1856), Anglican priest in Ireland

== Sports ==
- Jock Armstrong (born 1970), Scottish rally driver
- John Armstrong (cricketer) (born 1981), England
- John Armstrong (footballer, born 1890) (1890–1950), England
- John Armstrong (footballer, born 1936), Scotland
- John Armstrong (footballer, born 1987), Scotland
- John Armstrong (rugby league), Australia
- John Lee Armstrong (1932–2012), American football player and coach
- John Armstrong (American football) (born 1963), American football defensive back
- Johnny Armstrong (1897–1960), American football player

== Others ==
- John Armstrong (architect) (1857–1941), Scottish architect
- John Armstrong (artist) (1893–1973), British artist and muralist
- John Armstrong (British Army officer) (1674–1742), Surveyor General
- John Armstrong (British writer/philosopher) (born 1966), British writer and philosopher
- John Armstrong (Carolina) (1735–1784), American soldier and land registrar
- John Armstrong (of Carrick) (1909–1984), farmer and musician from Northumberland
- John Armstrong (comics) (died 2018), British artist
- John Armstrong (frontiersman) (1755–1816), Pennsylvania and Ohio
- John Armstrong (journalist/poet) (1771–1797), Scotland
- John Armstrong (model railroader) (1920–2004), US
- John Armstrong (physician) (1784–1829), England
- John Armstrong (poet) (1709–1779), Scotland
- C. A. J. ("John") Armstrong (1909–1994), British medieval historian
- John Alexander Armstrong (1922–2010), professor of political science at University of Wisconsin-Madison
- John Archibald Armstrong (1917–2010), Canadian business executive
- John Barclay Armstrong (1850–1913), Texas Ranger and U.S. Marshal
- John S. Armstrong (1850–1908), developer, Texas
- John Armstrong (engineer) (1775–1854), Britain
- John Armstrong, New Zealand Army, made calculations for the Te Rata Bridge
- John Eric Armstrong (born 1973), American serial killer
- John W. Armstrong, British naturopath who popularized urine therapy

== See also ==
- Armstrong (surname)
- Jack Armstrong (disambiguation)
- "Johnnie Armstrong", a folk ballad about a Scottish raider and folk-hero
