= Corcomroe =

Corcomroe may refer to

- Corcomroe (barony), a geographical region in County Clare, Ireland
- Corcomroe Abbey, an abbey in County Clare, Ireland
- Kings of Corco Modhruadh, rulers of an area roughly corresponding to the baronies of Corcomroe and Burren
