= Kilfenora Cathedral =

Church of Ireland cathedral in County Clare, Ireland

- Saint Fachtnan's Cathedral
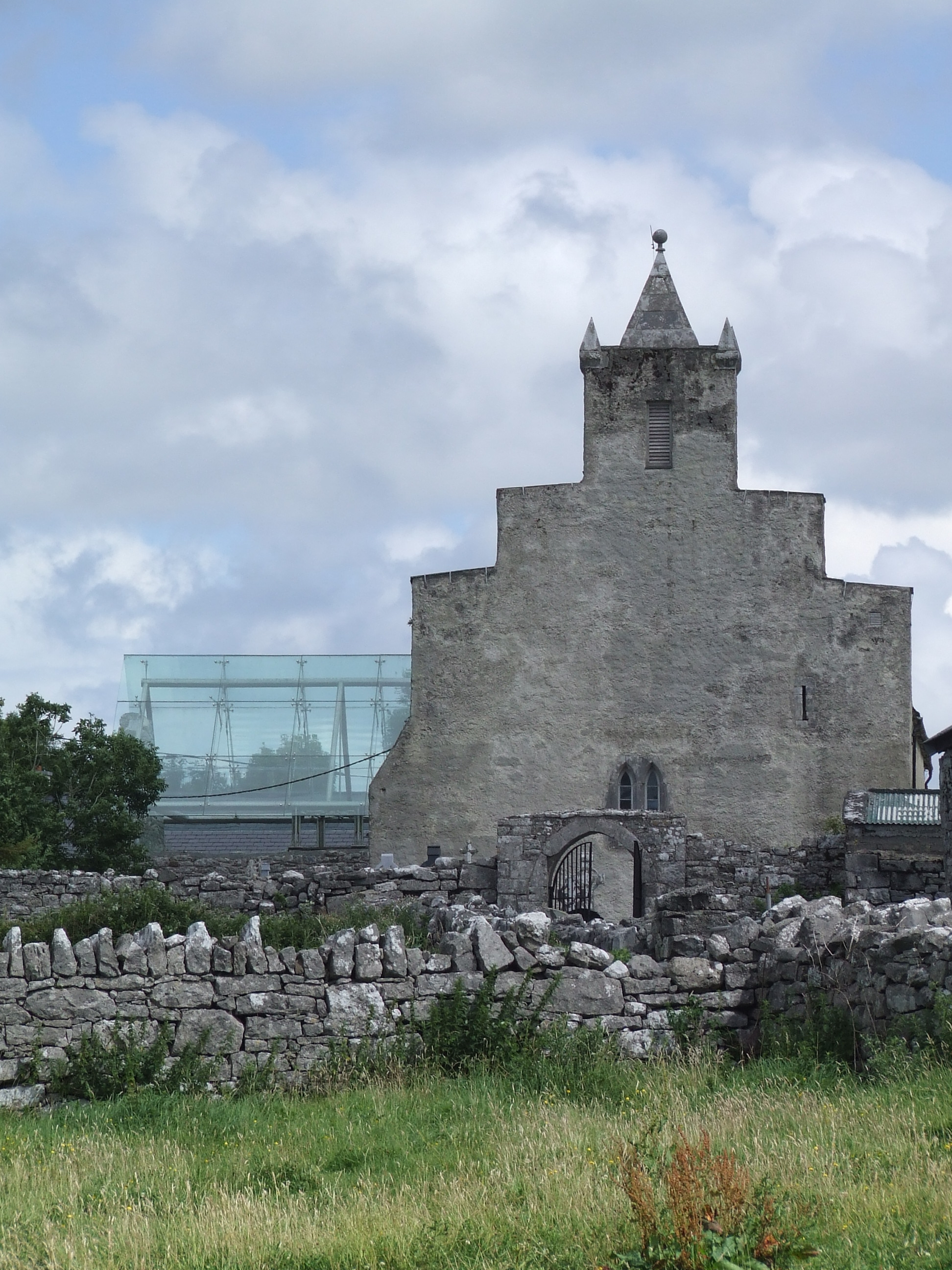
- Kilfenora Cathedral. The northern transept is on the left, with the glass roof installed in 2005 to conserve the high crosses

- Location in Ireland
- 52°59′24″N 9°12′36″W
- Location: Kilfenora, County Clare
- Country: Ireland
- Denomination: Church of Ireland
- Previous denomination: Roman Catholic
- Churchmanship: Central churchmanship

Clergy
- Bishop: Rt Rev Michael Burrows
- Rector: Rev'd Vicki Lynch
- Dean: Very Rev'd Richard Marsh

Designations

National monument of Ireland
- Official name: Kilfenora Abbey, cathedral and crosses; Kilfenora church at Kilcarragh
- Reference no.: 7, 8, 9

Kilfenora Cathedral is a cathedral of the Church of Ireland. Part of the structure is occasionally used as a place of worship by the Church of Ireland and it includes a bishop's throne among its furniture. The church is in the village of Kilfenora, in the region known as the Burren, County Clare, Ireland. In medieval times, it was the episcopal see of the Bishop of Kilfenora.

== History ==
According to tradition, the ecclesial presence at Kilfenora began with Saint Fachanan, who founded a church here in the 6th century. The first building was probably made of wood and followed by a stone construction. That church was burned down in 1055 by Murchad O'Brien. It was rebuilt between 1056 and 1058, only to be plundered in 1079 and then destroyed by an accidental fire in 1100.

In 1152, the Synod of Kells changed the status of the ecclesial settlement from monastic to diocesan. The diocese corresponded with the ancient territory of Corcomroe.

Kilfenora Cathedral is dedicated to St. Fachtna (also known as St. Fachanan or St. Fachtnan). The present structure dates to between 1189 and 1200. It was built in the so-called transitional style with a nave and a chancel. These were later separated and by 1839, "thirty-six feet of the east end" were roofless.

Part of the ecclesiastical province of Cashel, the diocese only extended over 200 square miles of very thinly populated land. It was reckoned the poorest diocese, with only 13 parishes. Demand for the position of bishop thus was not great, but for 1189 a bishop is recorded.

Following the Reformation in Ireland, the Catholic Church continued to appoint diocesan bishops in parallel with those of the established church. This practice ceased with the succession of James Augustine O'Daly (d. 1749). In 1750, the diocese was united with Kilmacduagh. In 1883 "Kilfenora and Kilmacduagh" was again merged with the diocese of Galway. Today, the bishops of Galway and Kilmacduagh are styled "Bishop of Galway and Kilmacduagh and Apostolic Administrator of Kilfenora"; while the bishop administers the diocese, in Canon Law, he does so as representative of the Pope.

In the Church of Ireland, Kilfenora was merged in turn with the dioceses of Limerick (1606–07), Tuam (1617–1742), Clonfert (1742–1752), Killaloe (1752–1976) and again Limerick (since 1976). In 1661 Samuel Pullen was made Archbishop of Tuam and Kilfenora became part of his province.

== Description ==
Today the church shows "a curious mix of styles" from a number of periods. The oldest part likely is the north wall of the nave showing (now plaster-covered) cyclopean masonry, this turn-of-the-first-millennium building may have been aisled.

One 19th-century visitor was unimpressed by the cathedral's appearance: "The attempt at a tower is conspicuously mean and hideous. A pile of emigrants' luggage with a rabbit-hutch or bird-cage overhead would look equally imposing".

The nave is now used for worship by the Church of Ireland, for which it was reconstructed around 1850. It features a bishop's throne, donated in 1981. There is also a large square stone baptismal font (possibly from around 1200). In addition, the church contains various tombs, but the interior is mostly devoid of ornamentation.

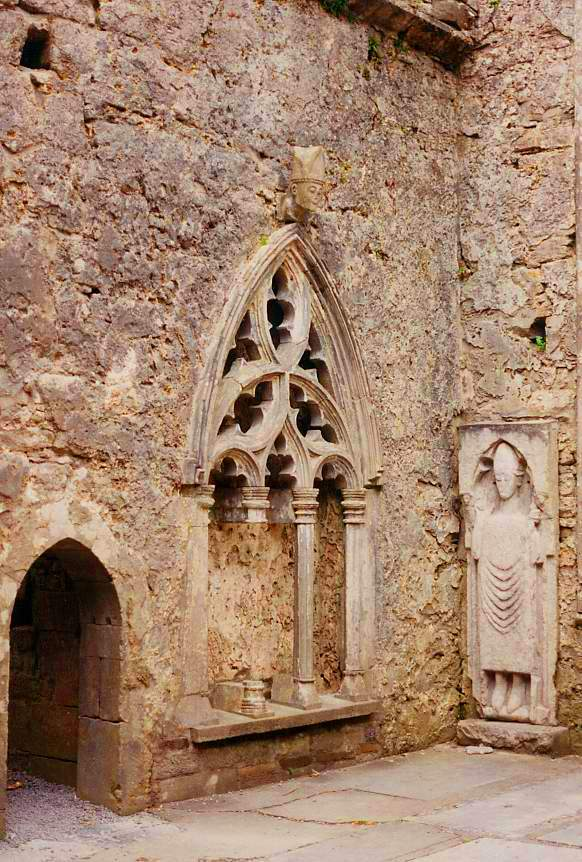
The Gothic sedilia in the chancel of Kilfenora Cathedral

According to local tradition, the late 12th- to early 13-century chancel was roofed with an oak ceiling (painted blue with gold leaf stars) until the end of the 18th century. It is roofless today and features a 15th-century doorway, a 15th-century Gothic sedilia as well as a Romanesque three-light east window with its triangular pillars topped by carved capitals. On both sides of the window is a carved effigy: a bishop with his right hand raised in blessing (possibly early 14th century), to the north; and a tonsured, bareheaded cleric holding a book (possibly 13th century) to the south. The chancel also contains several tombs and the remains of high crosses. It shares some design features such as the three-lighted decorated east window with other structures from the early 13th century, e.g.Corcomroe Abbey, belonging to the style known as the "school of the west". One of the tombs is the burial site of Neptune Blood, the uncle of Thomas Blood, who tried to steal the English crown jewels in 1671.

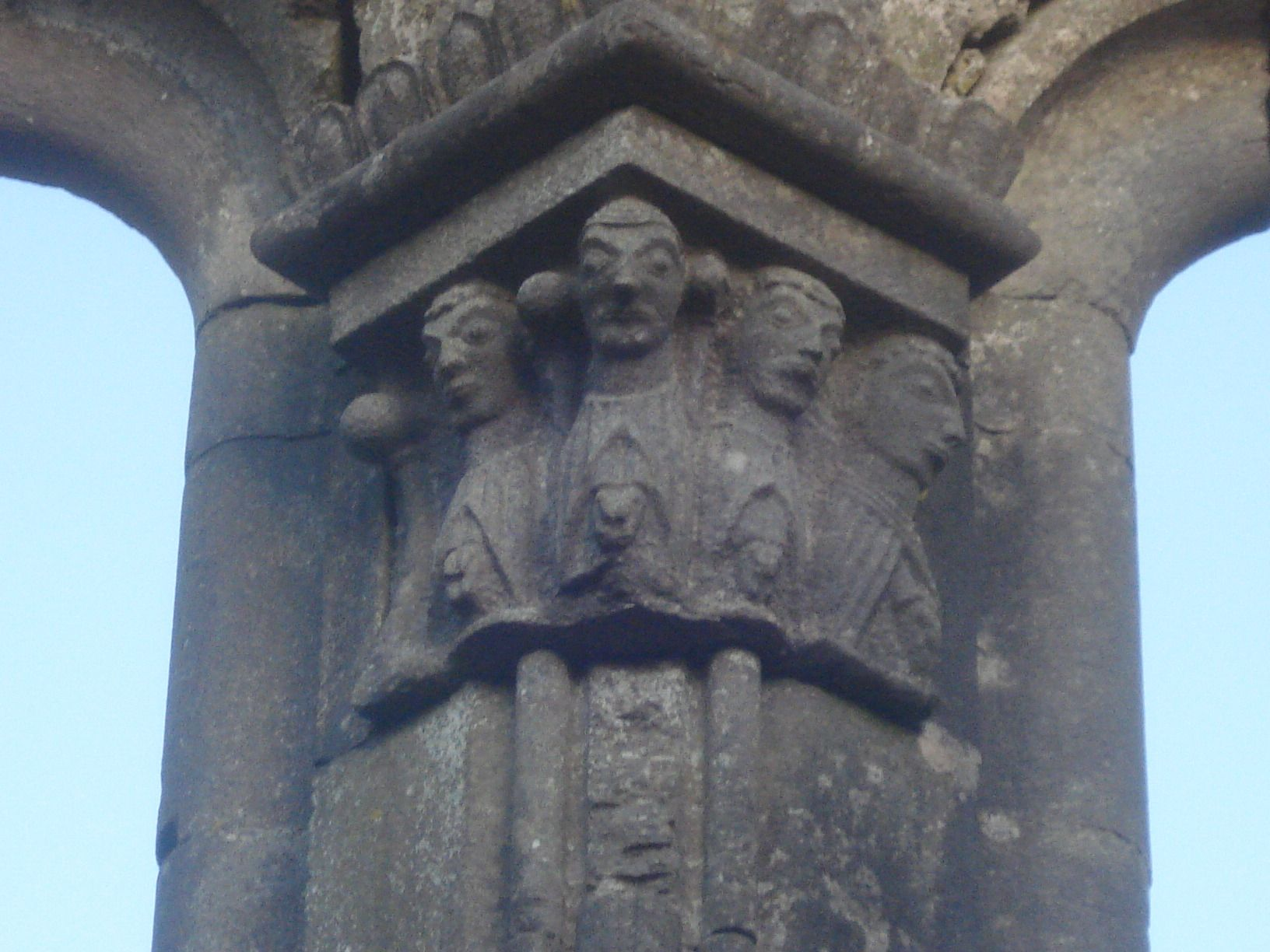
Detail of a pillar on the east window in the chancel of Kilfenora Cathedral

The Lady Chapel was in a rectangular wing leading to the north of the chancel. It likely shares the building date of the main building and may have served as a sort of transept in the past. Two lancet-type windows and a broken two-light one are left in the eastern wall. There are also fragments of a high cross.

Today, the cathedral remains in partially ruined state, although restoration work was done by the National Monument Service in the early 2000s. The transept was fitted with a glass roof in 2005 to protect the remains of the three high crosses moved there.

== Ecclesiastical parish ==
In 1837, the nave portion of the cathedral was adopted for use as the parish church for Kilfenora. It is still used for occasional worship.

== See also ==
- Dean of Kilfenora
- List of abbeys and priories in the Republic of Ireland (County Clare)
