= St. Fachanan, Kilfenora =

- Roman Catholic parish
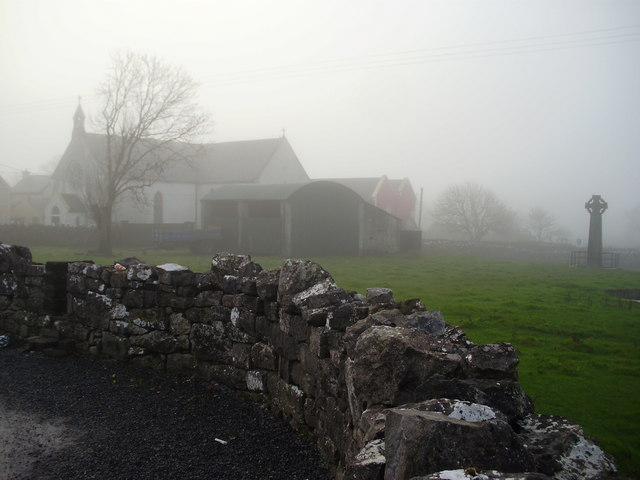
- St. Fachtna's Catholic church and the "West Cross" in the mist

- Location in Ireland
- Coordinates: 52°59′25″N 9°13′0″W
- Country: Ireland
- Province: Munster
- County: County Clare

Government
  - Dáil Éireann: Clare
- Time zone: UTC+0 (WET)
  - Summer (DST): UTC-1 (IST (WEST))

St. Fachanan, Kilfenora parish is a parish in County Clare, Ireland, and part of the Kilfenora Deanery of the Roman Catholic Diocese of Galway, Kilmacduagh and Kilfenora.

As of 2021, the parish priest is Edward Crosby.

The parish incorporates the parish of Kiltoraght.

The main church of the parish is the Church of St. Fachanan in Kilfenora, mentioned in or shortly before 1837. The second church of the parish is the Church of St. Attracta in de townland Toormore in Kiltoraght. According to Samuel Lewis, this church was built while writing his book "County Clare: A History and Topography", published in 1837.

The history of the parish is rather chequered, with beginnings around the year 590 when an abbey was founded here. The role of the abbey was recognized at the Synod of Kells and then elevated to be a separate diocese: Bishop of Kilfenora. The bishop had his see in Kilfenora Cathedral.
