= Joseph Amyrauld =

The Ven. Joseph Amyrauld (some sources, Amirault) (1644–1714) was a Church of Ireland priest in the late 17th and early 18th centuries.

Gore was born in Carrig, County Tipperary and educated at Trinity College, Dublin. He was ordained on 31 March 1667. In 1690 he succeeded his father as Archdeacon of Kilfenora, and in 1691 also became Archdeacon of Killaloe.
