= Richard Betts =

Richard Betts may refer to:

- Richard A. Betts, British climate scientist
- Richard K. Betts (born 1947), American political scientist and international relations scholar
- Richard Betts (priest), Anglican priest of the 17th century

== See also ==
- Dickey Betts (1943–2024), American musician
- Richard Bett, professor in philosophy and classics at Johns Hopkins University
