= Paul Amyrault =

17th-century Anglican priest in Ireland

Paul Amyrault (some sources Amyrauld) was a 17th-century Anglican priest in Ireland.

Amyrault was of Huguenot descent. He was Archdeacon of Kilfenora from 1663 to 1690, Provost of Tuam from 1667 to 1667 and Chancellor of Killaloe from 1667 to 1674;

He was succeeded by his son Joseph Amyrault as Archdeacon of Kilfenora.
