= John Whitty =

John Whitty may refer to:

- John Whitty (priest)
- John Whitty (cricketer)
- John Whitty (snooker player)
