= Clooney, Corcomroe =

Clooney Cluaine
- Civil parish
- Location in Ireland
- Coordinates: 52°53′50″N 9°19′14″W
- Country: Ireland
- Province: Munster
- County: County Clare
- Time zone: UTC+0 (WET)
  - Summer (DST): UTC-1 (IST (WEST))

Clooney (Irish: Cluaine) is a civil parish in County Clare, Ireland. It comprises the hamlets of Clooney (north and south), to the east of Ennistymon.

== Geography ==
It is part of the historical barony of Corcomroe that is situated in the north-western part of the county. It is bordered by the parish of Kilfenora to the north, Kiltoraght to the north-east, Rath to the east, Inagh to the south, Kilfarboy to the southwest, and Kilmanaheen to the west. It is divided into 40 townlands:

- Ardmore
- Ardrush
- Ballyculleeny
- Ballyvranneen
- Cahersherkin
- Carrownaclogh
- Clooney (North)
- Clooney (South)
- Cullenagh
- Derrymore
- Feagreen
- Garraun
- Glen (North)
- Glen (South)
- Gorteenmacnamara
- Gortkeel
- Illaunbaun
- Keelkyle
- Killeinagh
- Knockacarn
- Knockacullea (North)
- Knockacullea (South)
- Knockanulty
- Knockatullaghaun
- Knockdrummagh (North)
- Knockdrummagh (South)
- Knocknagraigue (East)
- Knocknagraigue (West)
- Knockneppy
- Knockroe
- Lavarreen
- Lisroe
- Moananagh
- Mooghna
- Renalicka
- Russa
- Spaug
- Teerleheen
- Tullagroe
- Tullaloughaun

== See also ==
- List of townlands of County Clare
