= Kiltoraght =

Civil parish in County Clare, Ireland

Kiltoraght Cill Tórachta
- Civil parish
- Location within Ireland
- Coordinates: 52°58′05″N 9°10′03″W
- Country: Ireland
- Province: Munster
- County: County Clare
- Time zone: UTC+0 (WET)
  - Summer (DST): UTC-1 (IST (WEST))

Kiltoraght (Irish: Cill Tórachta) is a civil parish in County Clare, Ireland. It is just south of Kilfenora and is part of Catholic parish of St. Fachanan.

== Location ==
The parish is in the barony of Corcomroe, and is 2.75 miles (4.43 km) southeast of Kilfenora. It is 2.5 by 2 miles (4.0 by 3.2 km) and covers 3,091 acres (1,251 ha). The land is mostly suitable for farming, either tillage or rich pasture. Lough Fergus lies on the western boundary of the parish. The main hamlet in 1845 was Knockeighra.

== Antiquities and History ==
The name of the patron saint of the parish is not found in the Irish Martyrologies. The old church in the townland of Knockroe is completely ruined. In 1580 there were two castles in the parish, at Inchovea and Kilmore, both the property of Teige MacMurrogh O’Brien. The main antiquities surviving in 1845 were Knockaunacurra fort and the ruin of Inchovea castle.

The population in 1841 was 1,074 in 163 houses. In 1845 the parish was united with the Catholic parish of Clooney. Kiltoraght today is part of Catholic parish of St. Fachanan in the Roman Catholic Diocese of Galway, Kilmacduagh and Kilfenora. It is served by the church of Saint Attracta, Kiltoraght.

== Townlands ==
Townlands are Ballynacarhagh, Derrynaheilla, Drumeevin, Kilmore North, Kilmore South, Knockaneden, Knockroe and Toormore.
