= John O'Nialain =

John O'Nialain also recorded as John O'Neylan was an Irish Roman Catholic clergyman in the 16th century: he was appointed Bishop of Kilfenora by Pope Paul III on 21 November 1541; and died in 1572.

Catholic Church titles
Preceded by Maurice O'Kelly	Bishop of Kilfenora; 1541–1572	Succeeded by See vacant
