= Charles Coote (priest, died 1780) =

Anglican priest

Charles Coote (died 1780) was an 18th-century Anglican priest in Ireland.

Coote was born in Kilmallock, where his father Chidley Coote was M.P.

Charles Coote was educated at Trinity College, Dublin. He was Prebendary of Kilrush in Killaloe Cathedral from 1740 to 1777; Vicar choral of tuam Cathedral from 1777 to 1781; and Dean of Kilfenora from 1761 until his death in 1780, when he was succeeded by his nephew, also Charles Coote.
