= John Whitty (priest) =

Irish archdeacon

John Whitty (1780–1864) was an Irish Anglican priest: Archdeacon of Kilfenora from 1822 until his death in 1864.

He was educated at Trinity College, Dublin and served for many years as Rector of Kilmanaheen.

He died on 13 February 1864.
