= Denis Ó Connmhaigh =

Irish clergyman

Denis Ó Connmhaigh also recorded as Denis O'Cahan or in Latin as Dionysius was an Irish Roman Catholic clergyman in the 15th century: he was appointed Bishop of Kilfenora on 17 November 1434 and consecrated on 26 December that year; resigned on 12 December 1491.

== Bibliography ==
- Brady, W. Maziere (1876). The Episcopal Succession in England, Scotland and Ireland, A.D. 1400 to 1875. Vol. 2. Rome: Tipografia Della Pace.
- Cotton, Henry (1851). The Province of Munster. Fasti Ecclesiae Hiberniae: The Succession of the Prelates and Members of the Cathedral Bodies of Ireland. Vol. 1 (2nd ed.). Dublin: Hodges and Smith.
- Fryde, E. B.; Greenway, D. E.; Porter, S.; Roy, I., eds. (1986). Handbook of British Chronology (3rd, reprinted 2003 ed.). Cambridge: Cambridge University Press. ISBN 0-521-56350-X.
- Moody, T. W.; Martin, F. X.; Byrne, F. J., eds. (1984). Maps, Genealogies, Lists: A Companion to Irish History, Part II. New History of Ireland. Vol. 9. Oxford: Oxford University Press. ISBN 0-19-821745-5.

Catholic Church titles
Preceded by Fearghal	Bishop of Kilfenora; 1434–1491	Succeeded by Muircheartach mac Murchadha Ó Briain
