= Neptune Blood (junior) =

Anglican priest

Neptune Blood (junior) (1655–1716) was Anglican priest in Ireland in the late 17th and early 18th centuries .

The son of another ecclesiastical Neptune Blood he too was educated at Triwnity College, Dublin. He became Rector of Killilagh in 1680; and Treasurer of the Diocese of Kilfenora from 1688 to 1692; and Dean of Kilfenora from 1692 until his death.
