= Maurice O'Kelly =

Maurice O'Kelly was an Irish Roman Catholic clergyman in the 16th century: he was appointed Bishop of Kilfenora in 1514; and died in office in 1541.

Catholic Church titles
Preceded by Muircheartach mac Murchadha Ó Briain	Bishop of Kilfenora; 1514–1541	Succeeded by John O'Nialain
