= Neptune Blood =

Irish Anglican priest

Neptune Blood was a 17th-century Anglican priest in Ireland.

Blood was educated at Trinity College, Dublin. He was ordained a priest on 12 March 1622. A Prebendary of Rath at Killaloe Cathedral, he was Archdeacon of Kilfenora from 1641 to 1663. He was Dean of Kilfenora from 1663 to 1692; and Vicar general from 1676.

His son was Dean of Kilfenora from 1692 until 1716.
