= Jack Armstrong =

Jack Armstrong may refer to:

== People ==
- Jack Armstrong (English footballer) (1884–1963), English footballer
- Jack Armstrong (Australian footballer) (1899–1942), Australian footballer
- Big Jack Armstrong (1945–2008), American radio personality from North Carolina
- Jack Armstrong, American radio personality from northern California on Armstrong & Getty
- Jack Armstrong (basketball) (born 1963), American basketball broadcaster and former coach
- Jack Armstrong (baseball) (born 1965), American baseball pitcher
- Jack Armstrong (piper) (1904–1978), English player of the Northumbrian smallpipes
- Jack Armstrong (artist) (born 1957), American artist, model, and jeweler

== Media ==
- Jack Armstrong, the All-American Boy, a radio adventure series from 1933 to 1951
- Jack Armstrong (serial), a 1947 Columbia Pictures film serial

== See also ==
- John Armstrong (disambiguation)
