= Muircheartach mac Murchadha Ó Briain =

Irish clergyman

Muircheartach mac Murchadha Ó Briain also recorded as Maurice O'Brien or in Latin as Mauricius was an Irish Roman Catholic clergyman in the late 15th and early 16th centuries: he was appointed Bishop of Kilfenora on 12 December 1491 with the Papal bulls being expediated on 26 August 1492.

Catholic Church titles
Preceded by Denis Ó Connmhaigh	Bishop of Kilfenora; 1491–1514	Succeeded by Maurice O'Kelly
