= Arthur Tatton =

Anglican priest

Arthur Tatton (1811-1885) was an Irish Anglican priest: the Archdeacon of Kilfenora from 1864 until his death.

He was born in Cork and educated at Trinity College, Dublin He was ordained deacon in 1841 and priest in 1842. He held incumbencies at Drumcliff and Kilmanaheen.
