= Dean of Kilfenora =

Church of Ireland official

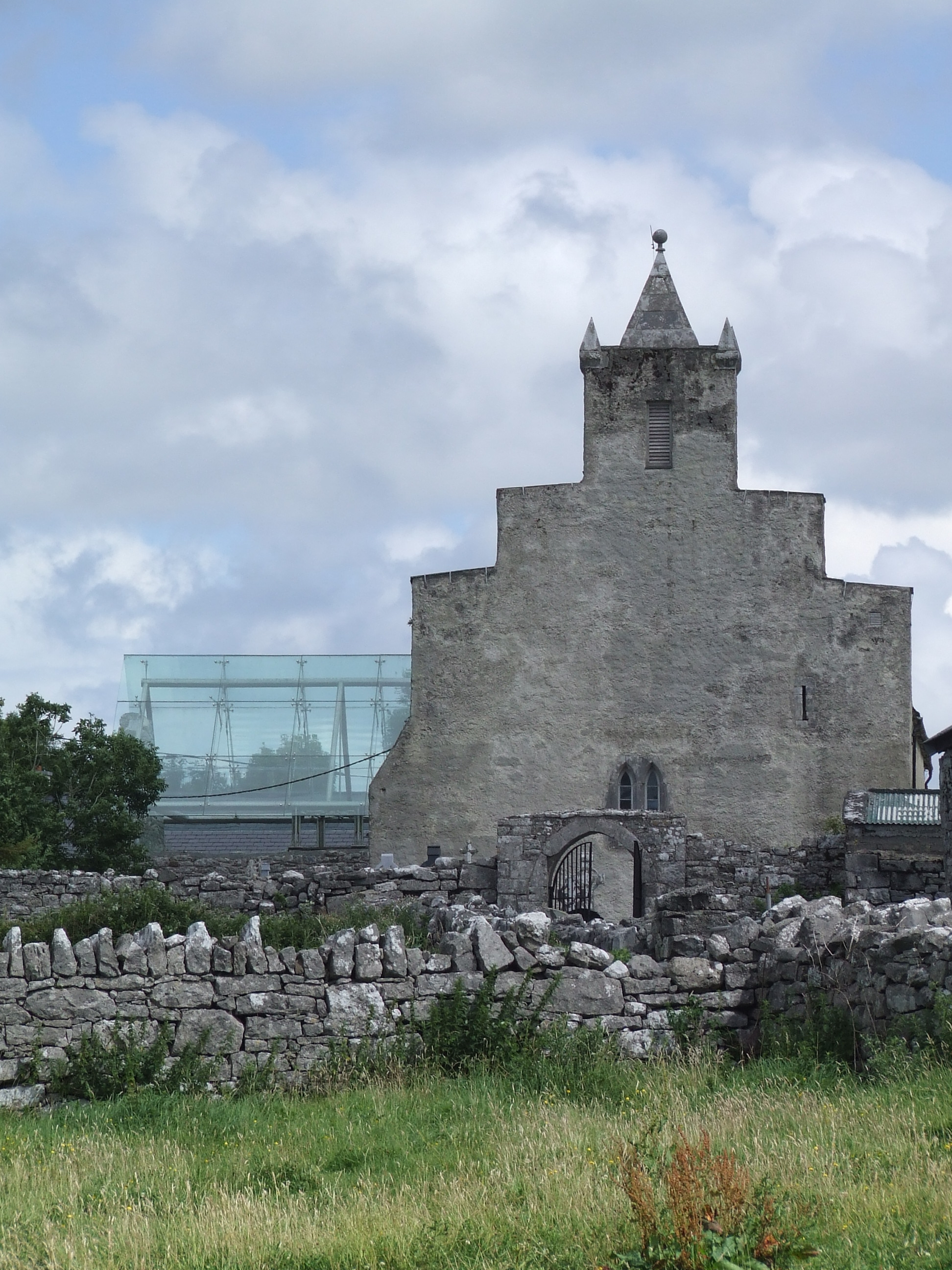
St Fachnan's, Kilfenora

The Dean of Kilfenora was based at the Cathedral Church of St Fachnan (also known as St Fachtna) in Kilfenora, Clare in the small Diocese of Kilfenora within the Church of Ireland. It is probable that the Dean and Chapter were established around the end of the 12th century.

St Fachnan's is now in a semi-ruined condition, although services are still held in the nave.

The current dean of Killaloe is also dean of Kilfenora.

== Deans of Kilfenora ==
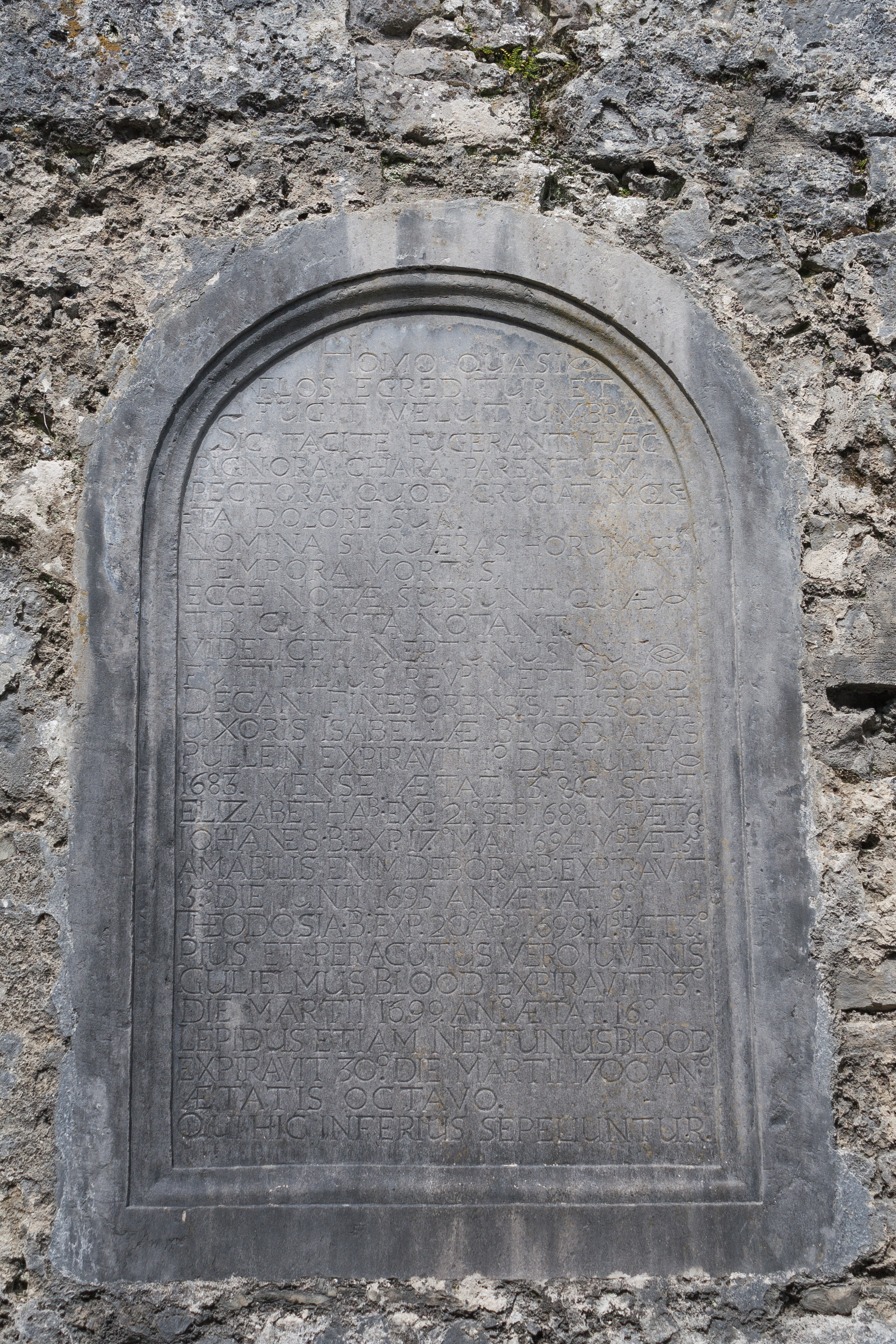
Monument erected by Neptune Blood and his wife Isabella in memory of their children.

Source: Fasti Ecclesiæ Hibernicæ

- ?–1281 Charles (Carolus or Congalach Ó Lochlainn) (afterwards Bishop of Kilfenora, 1281)
- ?–1303 Maurice (Mauritius or Maurice Ó Briain) (afterwards Bishop of Kilfenora, 1303)
- c.1585 Daniel Shennagh
- c.1591 Donald O'Heanon
- c.1615 Donat O'Shanny
- 1617-? Hygatus Lone (or Love) (died 1638)
- 1625–? John Yorke
- 1639–? Philip Flower
- 1663–1692 Neptune Blood (senior); married Elizabeth Lone, died 1692)
- 1692–1716 Neptune Blood (junior); married Isabella Pullen, died 1716)
- 1716–1724 William White
- 1724–1757 Jonathan Bruce
- 1761–1780 Charles Coote (uncle) (died 1796)
- 1781–1796 Charles Coote (nephew)
- 1796–1802 Latham Coddington
- 1802–1825 George Stevenson
- 1825–1847 William Henry Stacpoole (died 1847)
- 1847–1856 John Armstrong (died 1856)
- 1856–1877 Michael Keating
- 1884–1886 Robert Humphreys
- 1886–1908 (retired) John Robert Copley (died 1923)
