= William White (priest) =

William White was an Anglican priest in Ireland in the late 18th and early 19th centuries: a native of Dublin and educated at Trinity College there, he was Dean of Kilfenora from 1716 until his resignation in 1724.
