= Peter Kilkelly =

Irish Roman Catholic priest

- Bishop of Kilmacduagh
- In office: 1750-83
- Predecessor: Milo Burke

Orders
- Consecration: 14 October 1744

Personal details
- Born: County Galway
- Died: 29 May 1783

Peter Kilkelly was an Irish Roman Catholic priest, who served as Bishop of Kilmacduagh from 1750 to 1783.

Kilkelly was a native of County Galway. His family, Mac Giolla Cheallaigh, were a branch of the dynasty that once ruled Ui Fiachrach Aidhne, a kingdom occupying roughly the same land area as the diocese of Kilmacduagh.

A member of the Dominican Order, Kilkelly was appointed 22 June and consecrated 14 October 1744, and became Apostolic Administrator of Kilfenora when the two dioceses united in September 1750.

Bishop Kilkelly died on 29 May 1783. On his death, Kilfenora was united to the diocese of Kilmacduagh under Laurence Nihell (or Nihill), D.D., a native of Tulla, County Clare.

== See also ==
- Catholic Church in Ireland

== Other sources ==
- http://www.clarelibrary.ie/eolas/coclare/history/frost/chap7_kilfenora_diocese.htm
- http://www.irishtimes.com/ancestor/surname/index.cfm?fuseaction=Go.&UserID=
- The Surnames of Ireland, Edward MacLysaght, 1978.
- A New History of Ireland: Volume IX - Maps, Genealogies, Lists, ed. T.W. Moody, F.X. Martin, F.J. Byrne, pp. 322–324.

Catholic Church titles
Preceded by Milo Burke	Bishops of Kilmacduagh; 1750-1783	Succeeded by Laurence Nihill
