= George Stevenson (priest) =

Irish priest (1763–1825)

George Stevenson, LL.D. (7 August 1763 – 5 April 1825) was an Irish Anglican priest.

== Biography ==
Stevenson was born on 7 August 1763, in Egham, and educated at King's College, Cambridge. He was an assistant master at Eton from 1788 to 1796 when he became Rector of St James Garlickhythe in the City of London. He was Dean of Kilfenora from 1802 until his death.

Stevenson's daughter, Harriet Stevenson, married Lieut. General Charles Turner (1779-1854), of the 19th Regiment of Foot, who died in 1854, aged 75, at Sutton Lodge, Chiswick, Middlesex. The mural monument to her 10th son Capt. Henry Whichcote Turner (1829-1856), survives in All Saints Church Dickleburgh, Norfolk. He died on 5 April 1825, aged 27, of disease during the Crimean War, and was buried in the graveyard of the Highland Division at Kamara in the Crimea.
