= Robert Humphreys (priest) =

Irish 19th century anglican priest

Robert Humphreys was a 19th-century Anglican priest in Ireland.

Humphreys was born in County Cork, educated at Trinity College, Dublin and ordained in 1854. He served curacies at Drumcliff, Borrisokane, Broadford and Lisdoonvarna. He was the incumbent at Quin, County Clare, from 1881 to 1884. He was Dean of Kilfenora from 1884 to 1886 when he became Dean of Killaloe.
