= Charles Coote (priest, died 1796) =

Anglican priest in Ireland

Charles Coote (1713–1796) was an Anglican priest in Ireland.

Coote was educated at Trinity College, Dublin. He was the son of Chidley Coote and Jane Evans, and the brother of Eyre Coote. He was Precentor of Christ Church Cathedral, Dublin from 1772; and Dean of Kilfenora from 1781, where he succeeded his uncle (also called Charles Coote). He held both posts until his death in 1796.
