= William Stacpoole (priest) =

Irish Anglican priest

William Henry Stacpoole, D.D. (b. 17 January 1787; d. 29 January 1847) was a 19th-century Anglican priest in Ireland.

Stacpoole was educated at Trinity College, Dublin. He was Dean of Kilfenora from 1825 until his death.
