= Latham Coddington =

Irish Anglican priest

Latham Coddington (2 February 1772 – 14 January 1860) was an Anglican priest in Ireland.

Coddington was born in County Meath and educated at Trinity College, Dublin. He was Dean of Kilfenora from 1796 until 1802. when he became the Vicar of Timolin, a post he held until his death. He was a Prebendary of Timothan in St Patrick's Cathedral, Dublin from 1809 until 1844.
