= Corcomroe (barony) =

Barony of Corcomroe Corco Modhruadh
- Location within Ireland
- Coordinates: 52.990278°N 9.216667°W
- Country: Ireland
- Province: Munster
- County: Clare

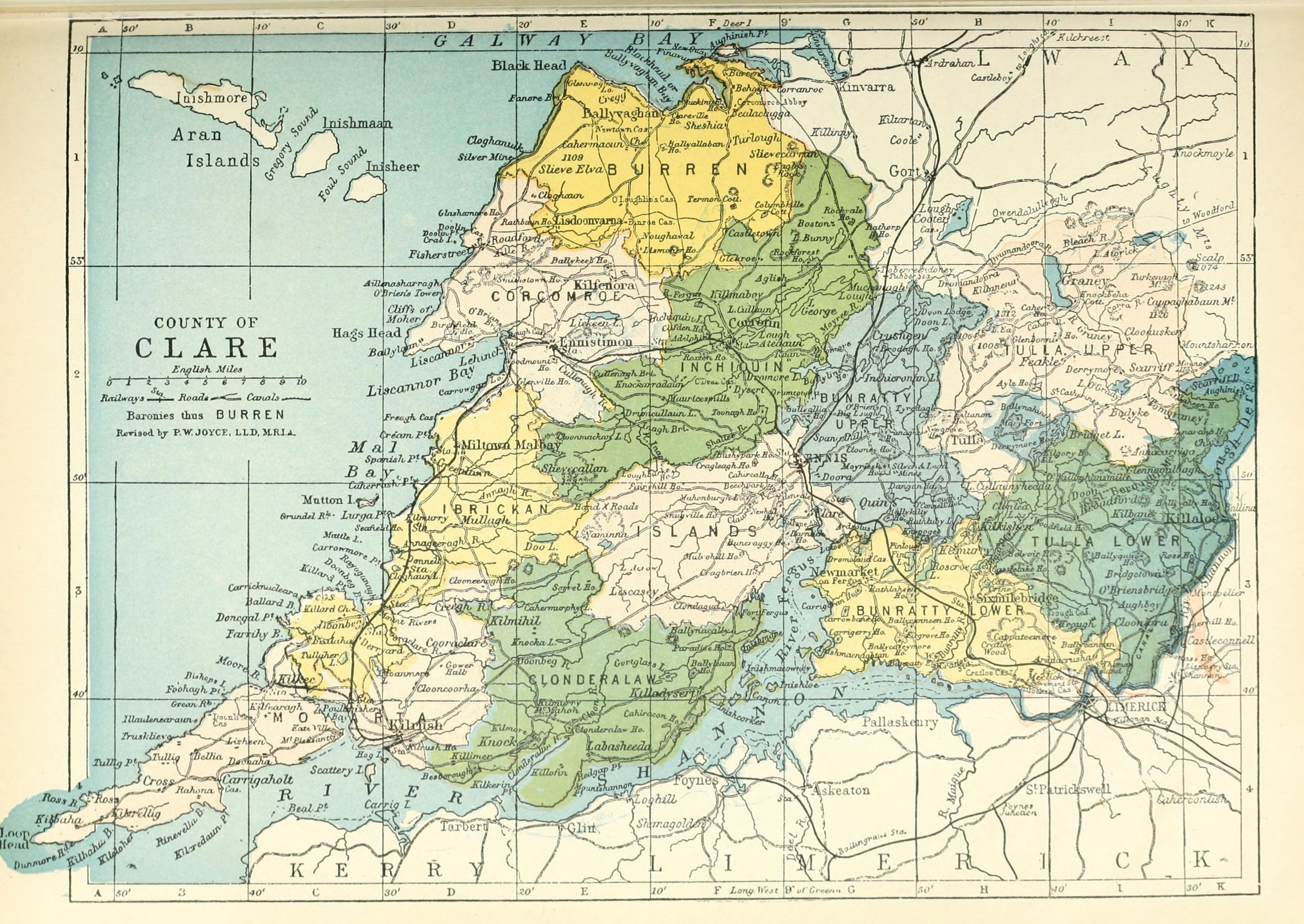
Baronies of Clare. Corcomroe is towards the north.

Corcomroe (Irish: Corco Modhruadh, meaning 'seed or people of Modhruadh') is a barony in County Clare, Ireland. It is the southern half of the Gaelic tuath of Corco Modhruadh.

== Legal context ==
Baronies were created after the Norman invasion of Ireland as divisions of counties and were used the administration of justice and the raising of revenue. While baronies continue to be officially defined units, they have been administratively obsolete since 1898. However, they continue to be used in land registration and in specification, such as in planning permissions. In many cases, a barony corresponds to an earlier Gaelic tuath which had submitted to the English Crown.

== Location ==
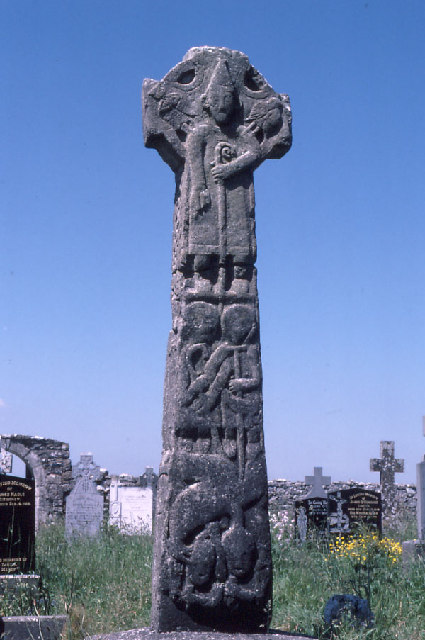
The "Doorty" Cross, Kilfenora

This tuath, or territory, was coextensive with the Diocese of Kilfenora. At some point around the 12th Century, the territory was divided in two: Corco Modhruadh Iartharach ("Western Corcomroe") and Corco Modhruadh Oirthearach ("Eastern Corcomroe") also known as Boireann. The territories were ruled by the Ó Conchubhair Corcomroe and Ó Lochlainn clans, respectively. They became administrative baronies in the Lordship of Ireland in the late 16th century known as Corcomroe and Burren.

Corcomroe Abbey, which is in the barony of Burren, itself was also known as the Abbey of Burren, or Sancta Maria de Petra Fertilis (Blessed Mary of the Fertile Rock).

The barony contains the villages of Ennistymon, Lehinch, Kilfenora, Liscannor, Doolin and Kilshanny. It contains the civil parishes of Clooney, Kilfenora, Killaspuglonane, Kiltoraght, Kilmanaheen, Kilmacrichy, Killilagh and Kilshanny.

== Corco Modruadh in the Annals of Inisfallen ==
Corcomroe is mentioned in the Annals of Inisfallen:

- 907. Kl. The plundering of Lough Rí by the men of Mumu as far as Mairg Laigen and Mag Léna, as a result of which Mael Craíbe son of Cathalán, king of Cenél Fiachrach, and many others were slain. Cet, son of Flaithbertach, took the kingship of Corcu Modruad. Eight score ferryings(?) [were made] by Cormac, king of Caisel, until they [his forces] arrived in Cluain Moccu Nóis during that Christmas.
- 919. Kl. Death of Cet son of Flaithbertach, king of Corcu Modruad. A year of scarcity and hunger.
- 920. The slaying of Murchad son of Flann, king of Corcu Bascinn.
- 936. Repose of Aniudán son of Mael Gorm, king of Corcu Modruad.
- 983. A large fleet [was brought] by Brian, son of Cennétig, into the territory of Connachta, and portion of his force was slain there, i.e. Mael Sechnaill, son of Coscrach, and Finn, son of Dubchrón, and Lochlainn son of Mael Sechnaill, royal heir of Corcu Modruad. His officials went by land into Uí Briúin, and great slaughter was mutually inflicted upon them and upon the Uí Brúin.
- 993. A naval raid by Brian, and he reached Breifne from Loch Rí by way of Áth Liac northwards. A great slaughter of the Connachta by the king of Corcu Modruad, namely, by Conchobar, son of Mael Sechnaill, and Ruaidrí son of Coscrach, king of Uí Briuin, and many others fell therein.
- 996. A slaughter of the Corcu Modruad in Connachta, in which Muirgius, son of Ruaidri, fell.
- 1003. The slaying of Conchobar son of Mael Sechnaill, king of Corcu Modruad, and of Amlaíb, son of Lochlainn, and of Aicher Ua Traigthech in the west of Connachta; and Cathal, son of Labraid, was killed by the sons of Donnchadh Finn.
- 1015. Death of Domnall, son of Dub dá Bairenn, in a battle against the son of Bran. Cathal, son of Conchobur, and Lochlainn his kinsman, were treacherously slain ... both from their kingship. One followed the other in the kingship of Corcu Modruad. Death of Aed Ua Ruairc, king of Bréifne. The foreigners of the Isles, viz. with the complement of seven ships, raided the Islands, and they plundered Ara, Inse Mod, and Inis Aingin(?), and carried off one hundred and fifty [captives] as booty.
- 1016. The slaughter of Ára, in which Ua Lochlainn, royal heir of Corcu Modruad, was killed in Port Ciaráin in Ára. It was the Conmaicne who slew him. A great soughing wind in the autumn of the above year, and it broke down woods and houses, and people well-nigh died of terror. Death of Muiredach son of Cadla, king of Conmaicne Mara.
- 1017. Death of Donnchadh, son of Dub dá Bairenn. He was slain by Mael Muad.
- 1023. Great drought from the Epiphany until May. Ua Duib dá Bairenn was blinded. A solar eclipse this year, i.e. the spring of the black cloud.
- 1027. Death of Conchobar son of Mael Sechnaill, king of Corcu Modruad.
- AI1094.3 The Síl Muiredaig inflicted a great slaughter on the Corcu Modruad and on [the army of] the west of Connachta, and Ua Flaithbertaig, and the grandson of Conchobar, son of Mael Sechnaill, escaped therefrom.

== See also ==
- Corc mac Fergus
- Kings of Corco Modhruadh
- List of abbeys and priories in Ireland (County Clare)
- Pre-Norman invasion Irish Celtic kinship groups, from whom many of the modern Irish surnames came from
