= Jonathan Bruce =

Jonathan Bruce was an 18th-century Anglican priest in Ireland.

Bruce was born in County Cork and educated at Trinity College, Dublin. He was Dean of Kilfenora from 1724 to 1757.
