= Richard Betts (priest) =

Irish Anglican priest

Richard Betts was an Anglican priest.

Betts was Chaplain-in-Ordinary to King James I & VI. He was appointed Bishop of Kilfenora by letters patent on 19 September 1628, but who, when he arrived in Ireland and learned of the poverty of the see, declined the appointment and left without consecration.
