= John Armstrong (model railroader) =

- Born: November 18, 1920; Canandaigua, New York
- Died: July 28, 2004 (aged 83); Montgomery Village, Maryland
- Education: Purdue University
- Occupation: Mechanical engineer
- Known for: Model railroad layout design and operations

John H. Armstrong (November 18, 1920 – July 28, 2004) was a mechanical engineer, inventor, editor, prolific author, and model railroader best known for layout design and operations. He was married for 44 years to Ellen Palmer. They had four children.

== Early life ==
He was born and raised in Canandaigua, New York, and began designing his Canandaigua Southern Railroad model layout when he was 14 years old.

After earning a mechanical engineering degree from Purdue University, he settled in Silver Spring, Maryland in the late 1940s. He was employed at the Naval Ordnance Laboratory of the United States Navy in White Oak, Maryland and contributed to the design of weapons systems for nuclear submarines. Following his retirement from the Navy, he was a contributing editor for Railway Age magazine for ten years.

== Model railroad construction ==
In evenings and on weekends he began building his Canandaigua Southern Railroad O scale layout in the basement of the modest Armstrong family home, carefully cutting the cross-ties from balsa wood, setting them on rail-beds made from scale-sized gravel, and then laying out each length of track and carefully nailing it into place with tiny railroad spikes to scale that were hammered into the cross-ties one at a time.

Armstrong was extensively published in the U.S. railroading press, publishing 13 books including "Railroad: What It Is, What It Does" (1978) and articles for Model Railroader and trade magazine Railway Age. He has over 300 references in the Trains Magazine Index.

== Influence on the hobby ==
Armstrong wrote many books and articles on the subject of railroading and model railroading. His personal model railroad, the Canandaigua Southern, was the subject of many newspaper and magazine articles by other writers.

In the late 1940s, Armstrong submitted a track plan to a contest sponsored by the magazine Model Railroader. His plan was so successful that it led to an invitation to contribute an article to the magazine on the Canandaigua Southern, which appeared in 1946. He remained a regular writer for the magazine, contributing 76 articles over his lifetime. His last article, was 'Main line through the mountains', was published posthumously in the April 2005 issue.

He also held at least four patents.

Armstrong was well known in the model railroad community in part through his memberships in the National Model Railroad Association, the Capital Area O Scalers and the Lexington Group. He was named to the O Scale Hall of Fame in 1998. He was a two-time recipient of the National Model Railroad Association's Distinguished Service Award, in 1968 and 1997, and was named an NMRA Pioneer of Model Railroading in 2001.

== Death ==
Armstrong died in Montgomery Village, Maryland of complications due to pulmonary disease on July 28, 2004, and was widely mourned.

== Selected books and articles ==
- "All About Signals" (Two-article series). Trains Magazine, June and July 1957.
- Track Planning for Realistic Operation (Kalmbach Publishing Co, Milwaukee, Wisconsin, 1963. Second Edition, Kalmbach Books, 1976, ISBN 0-89024-504-5)
- The Railroad: What It Is, What It Does (Omaha, NE: Simmons-Boardman, 5th ed. 2008, ISBN 978-0-911382-58-7.)
- Creative Layout Design (Kalmbach Books, 1978, ISBN 0-89024-538-X)
- 18 Tailor-Made Model Railroad Track Plans (Kalmbach Books, 1983, ISBN 0-89024-040-X)
