= John Armstrong (dean of Kilfenora) =

John Armstrong (1792–1856) was a 19th-century Anglican priest in Ireland.

Armstrong was born in King's County (now Offaly), educated at Trinity College, Dublin and became Dean of Kilfenora in 1847.
