= Chidley Coote =

Irish politician

Chidley Coote was an Irish politician.

Coote was educated at Trinity College, Dublin.

He sat in the Irish House of Commons as a Member of Parliament (MP) for Kilmallock from 1695 to 1703, serving with Standish Hartstonge. Among his sons were the soldier Eyre and priest Charles.
