= Saint Fachanan =

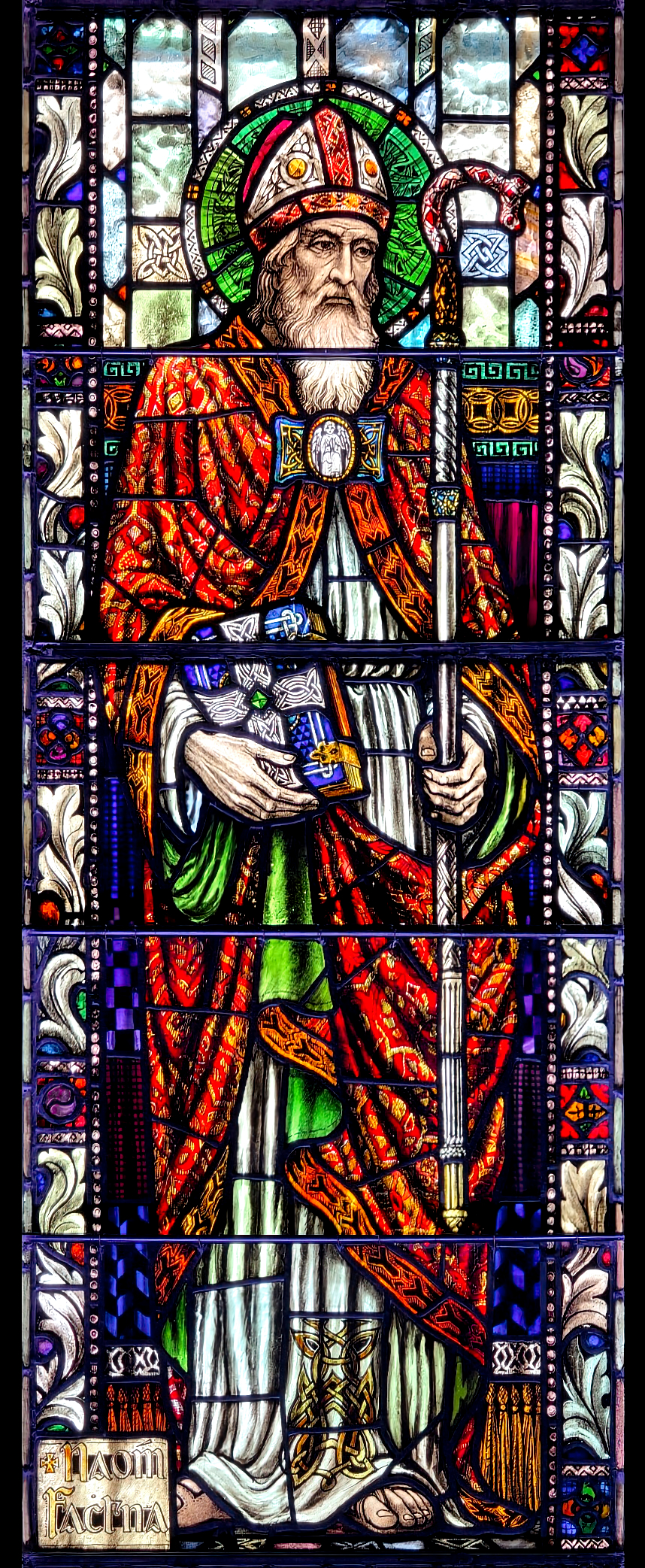
St. Fachtna by Alfred Child at the Honan Chapel

Saint Fachanan (also known as Fachtna), belonged to the ancient princely race of the Corcu Loígde.

Very little is known with certainty about Fachanan. He is linked by a strong early tradition with Kilfenora, where he founded a monastery in the sixth century. He is venerated as the first Bishop of Kilfenora.

In the Roman Catholic Church, this diocese is now administered by the Diocese of Galway and in the Anglican church by the Diocese of Limerick and Killaloe.

St Fachanan's great achievement was the establishment of the monastic school of Ross, at what is now Rosscarbery, in county Cork, one of the most famous schools of Ireland, which flourished for three hundred years and survived in some form until the coming of the Normans.

His feast day is 13 August.
