= John Armstrong (journalist/poet) =

Scottish journalist and poet

John Armstrong (1771–1797) was a Scottish journalist and poet from Leith.

== Biography ==
Armstrong was born of humble parents, at Leith, in June 1771. After attending Leith Grammar School and the High School of Edinburgh, he entered the University of Edinburgh, where he graduated with and MA. In 1789 he published Juvenile Poems, with remarks on Poetry, and a Dissertation on the best means of punishing and preventing Crimes. Their publication obtained for him the honour of being invited to compose the words of the songs used in connection with the ceremony of laying the foundation-stone of the University of Edinburgh buildings. While tutor in a family in Edinburgh, Armstrong pursued the theological studies necessary to qualify him to become a preacher in the Church of Scotland, but in 1790 he removed to London, where he obtained employment on one of the daily papers at a small weekly salary.

Armstrong used the nom de plume of "Albert" and for that reason he was at one time thought to have been the author of "A Confidential Letter of Albert; from his first attachment to Charlotte to her death" which was published in 1790, but this was reassigned to a novelist named Anne Eden. Few details are known of her life.

In 1791 he published a collection of poems, under the title Sonnets from Shakspeare. His literary prospects continued gradually to improve, and he was in receipt of a considerable income, when his health began suddenly to give way.

He retired to Leith, where he died of a rapid decline, 21 July 1797.
