= Jack Armstrong (artist) =

American artist

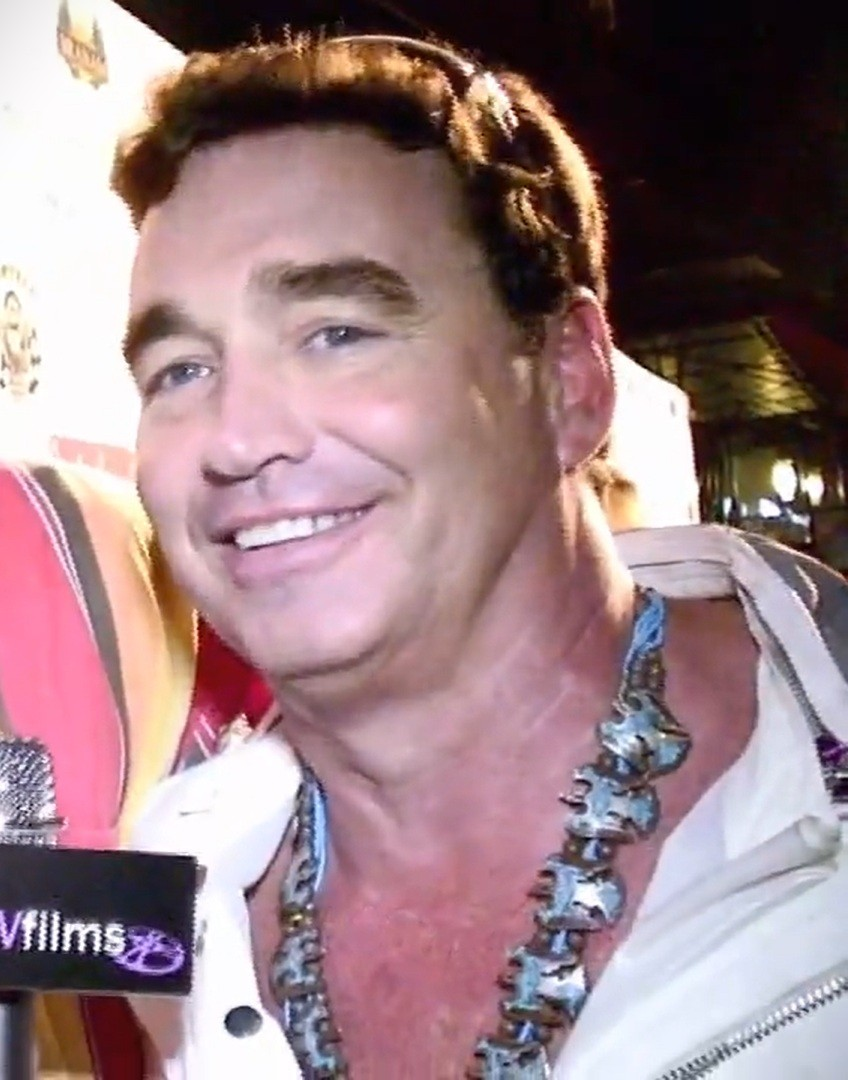
Armstrong in 2010

Jack Armstrong is an American artist who is known as the founder of Cosmic Extensionalism or Cosmic X art. Armstrong has created only 100 Cosmic X paintings. His other works include the Cosmic Starship motorcycle and the Cosmic Star Cruiser bicycle. His Cosmic Firebird painting served as the centerpiece for a ballet in 2011.

== Life ==
Jack Armstrong was born in Omaha, Nebraska.

Armstrong arrived in New York in 1979 where he became friends with Andy Warhol. Armstrong has never been represented by a dealer and is known for his anti-establishment views of the industry.

In 2002, Armstrong co-owned the Black Star of Queensland, a sizable sapphire. He became known for his connection to the gem, which he reportedly slept with, under his pillow. There ensued a controversial legal battle named by the Los Angeles Times as the "Heavy Weight Gem Scuffle" in which Armstrong fought for control of the stone.

== Cosmic X ==
Between 1999 and 2000, Armstrong founded Cosmic Extensionalism or Cosmic X, a new style of art. He was inspired by an ethereal experience he had with the Black Star of Queensland. Cosmic X requires the artist to embody the art they are creating, feeling no separation between the art itself. This demands a unique state of mind to be achieved, connecting to a universal presence that Armstrong believes exists in every being and is the force that generates the art, rather than the artist.

=== 100 Paintings on Canvas ===
Armstrong decided to paint only 100 paintings using his Cosmic X style after he had reportedly destroyed all of his original works in 1994.

His work features in the private collections of Walmart heiress Alice Walton, Michel Polnareff, and Narendra Patel. His paintings have been offered for sale at prices of up to $113 million.

==== Warhol Naked ====
The acrylic on canvas painting Warhol Naked, one of the 100 Cosmic X paintings created between 1999 and 2019, has been offered for sale at $300 million. Armstrong has commented "This painting captures the true 'spirit' of Andy, with its deep red color and bold signature in white. Warhol is an image Andy spent his life creating.

=== Cosmic Starship ===
In October 2010, Armstrong unveiled his flagship piece of kinetic art, the Cosmic Starship. The motorcycle was conceived by Robert Star, CEO of Star Global International Inc., who wanted to launch Armstrong on the world stage in a similar way that Campbell's Soup Cans launched Andy Warhol on an unsuspecting art world that claimed, "If this is art it is the end of art." The work is a Harley-Davidson V-ROD motorcycle that Armstrong painted using acrylic paint and 37 coats of clear-coat. The V-Rod motorcycle had been developed in a joint project with Porsche Engineering and Erik Buell and was chosen for its futuristic style. The Cosmic Starship was sold in 2012 for $3 million to the Moran family of California.

=== Cosmic Firebird ===
In 2011, his Cosmic Firebird painting was the mascot and centre piece for a ballet produced and directed by Marie Hoffman in association with Jack Armstrong's "The Cosmic Firebird Dance Concert" held at The Rose Centre Theatre on April 2, 2011, which featured performances by the Encore Dance Company, the APA Repertory Ensemble, HBHS Dance Team, and more.

=== Cosmic Star Cruiser ===
In 2014, he painted the Cosmic Star Cruiser bicycle, an art bike designed and painted with fellow artist Kelsey Fisher with a $3 million price tag. The Cosmic Star Cruiser was created on a SOLE beach cruiser made in Los Angeles, over a period of six months and made its debut appearance at the Big Boys Toys event in Dubai in 2014.

=== Cosmic Cowboy Boots ===
In 2018, Armstrong painted a pair of 1968 Tony Lama boots that he owned, known as his Cosmic Cowboy Boots.

== Stolen works ==
In 2018, Armstrong's painting Steve McQueen Le Mans was reported stolen by The Hollywood Times from a private home in Dallas, Texas, where it was on loan. The painting was valued at $13 million. In 2021, it was reported that two Armstrong paintings, IMAGINE #3 and PrimalSun #1, were stolen from a car in Westchester, Los Angeles.
