= Kings of Corco Modhruadh =

King of Corco Modhruadh

Details
- Style: his Majesty
- First monarch: Torpaid
- Last monarch: Conchobar Ua Chonchobuir
- Abolished: 1104

The Kings of Corco Modhruadh reigned over an area that was coextensive with the diocese of Kilfenora.

In the 12th-century, the kingdom split into Corco Modhruadh Iartharach ("Western Corcomroe") and Corco Modhruadh Oirthearach ("Eastern Corcomroe") also known as Boireann. These districts were ruled by the Ó Conchubhair Corcomroe and Ó Lochlainn families, respectively.

In the 16th-century these areas became the English administrative baronies of Corcomroe and Burren.

== List of kings (incomplete) ==
For further references, see Annals of Inisfallen

- Torpaid, died 769.
- Flaithbertach mac Dub Ruip, died 873.
- Cet mac Flaithbertach, 907–919
- Aniudán mac Mael Gorm, died 936.
- Conchobar mac Mael Sechnaill, fl. 993, died 1003.
- Cathal mac Conchobur, died 1015
- Lochlainn, died 1015.
- Conchobar mac Mael Sechnaill, died 1027.
- Congalach Ua Lochlainn, died 1045.
- Anad Ua Lochlainn, killed 1060.
- Conchobar Ua Chonchobuir, died 1104
