= John Armstrong (footballer, born 1890) =

English footballer

Personal information
- Full name: John Busby Armstrong
- Date of birth: 23 September 1890
- Place of birth: Gateshead, England
- Date of death: 13 December 1950 (aged 60)
- Position: Forward

Senior career*
Years	Team	Apps	(Gls)
1911–1912	Shildon Athletic		
1912–1913	Grimsby Town	4	(1)
- * Club domestic league appearances and goals

John Busby Armstrong (23 September 1890 – 13 December 1950) was an English professional footballer who played as a forward.
