= Corcomroe Abbey =

Ruined Cistercian friary in County Clare, Ireland

- Mainistir Chorco Modhruadh
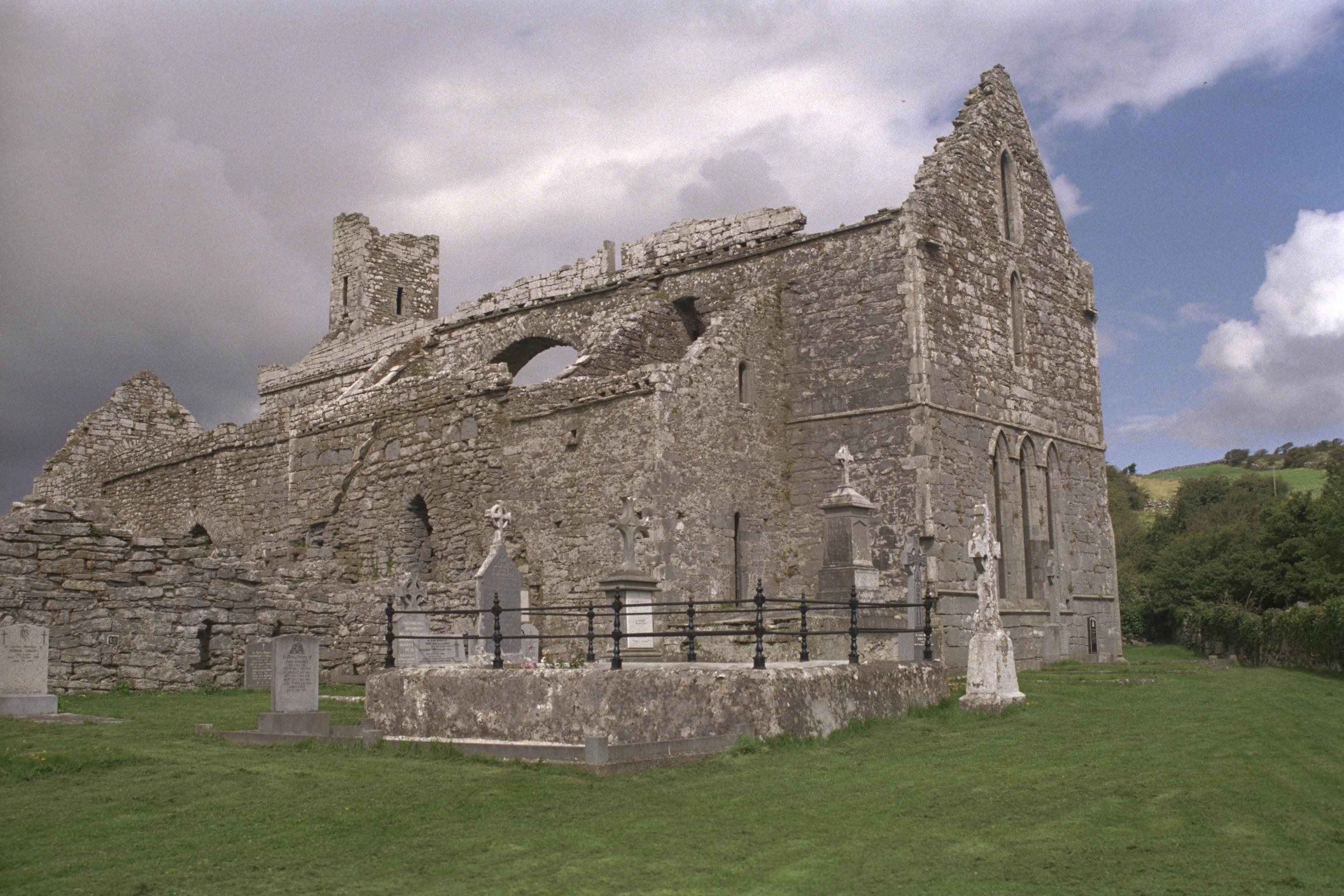
- Corcomroe Abbey as viewed from the southeast

- Location within Ireland
- Interactive map of Corcomroe Abbey

Monastery information
- Other names: Abbey Church of Saint Mary of the Fertile Rock, Corcomroe
- Order: Cistercians
- Established: 1180–1200
- Disestablished: 1554
- Diocese: Galway, Kilmacduagh and Kilfenora

People
- Founder: Domnall Mór Ua Briain or Donough Cairbreach

Architecture
- Status: Inactive
- Style: Gothic

Site
- Location: County Clare, Ireland
- Coordinates: 53.126703°N 9.054014°W
- Public access: Yes

Corcomroe Abbey (Irish: Mainistir Chorca Mrua) is an early 13th-century Cistercian monastery located in the north of the Burren region of County Clare, Ireland, a few miles east of the village of Ballyvaughan in the Barony of Burren. It was once known as "St. Mary of the Fertile Rock", a reference to the Burren's fertile soil.

The Gothic ruins feature stone carvings that are considered to be among the finest in a Cistercian church in Ireland. The abbey appears in W. B. Yeats' play The Dreaming of Bones. It is a National Monument and is open to the public.

== Geography ==
=== Location ===
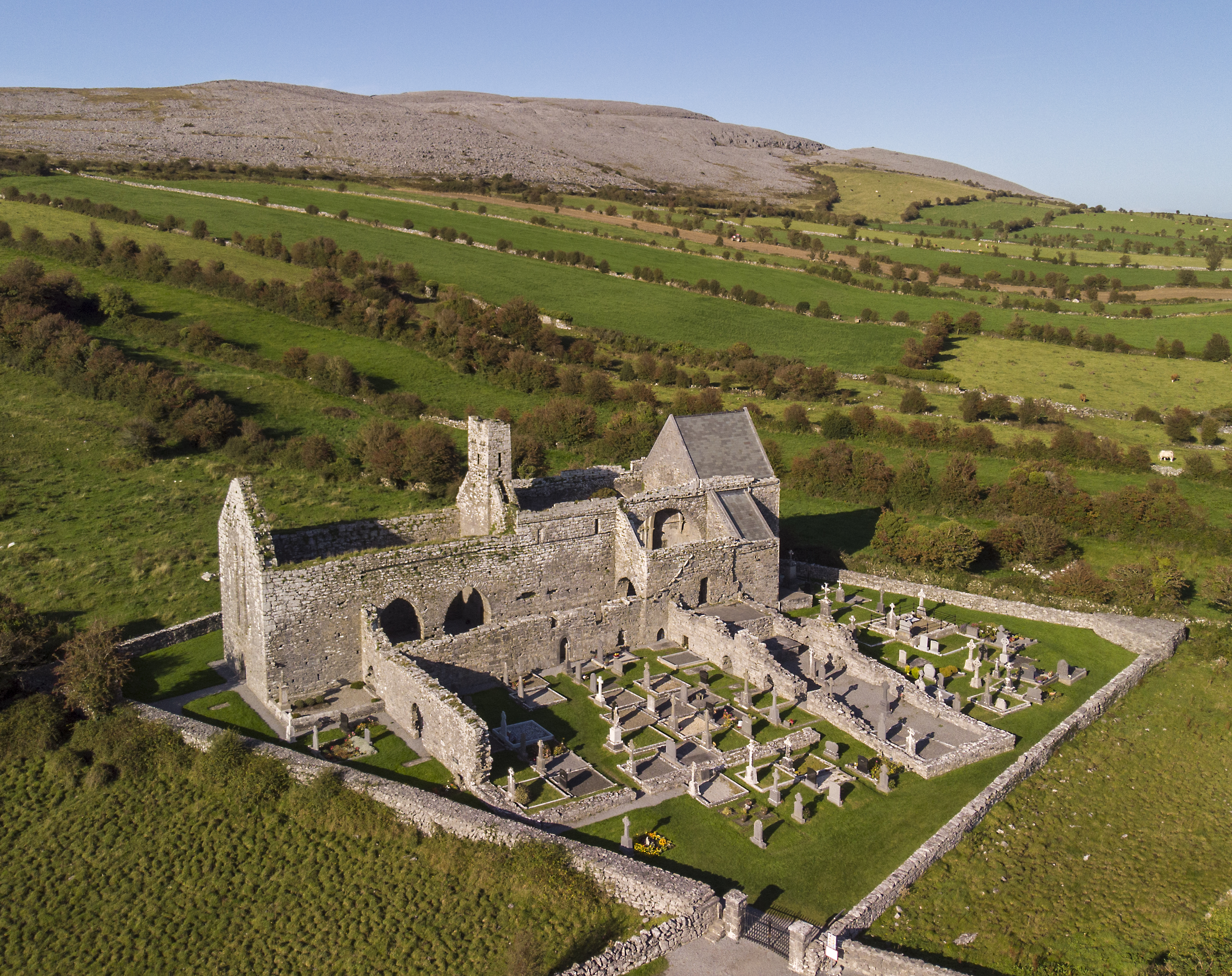

The ruins are located around 800 metres east of the village of Bellharbour in Glennamannagh, a valley of the Burren. The closest large village is Ballyvaughan, a few miles further west. The L1014 road passes close by the abbey. About a kilometre from the abbey are the ruined churches of Oughtmama. Although no stream was present at the site, several wells are located in the townland where the abbey stands, which probably provided water to the monastic foundation.

== History ==
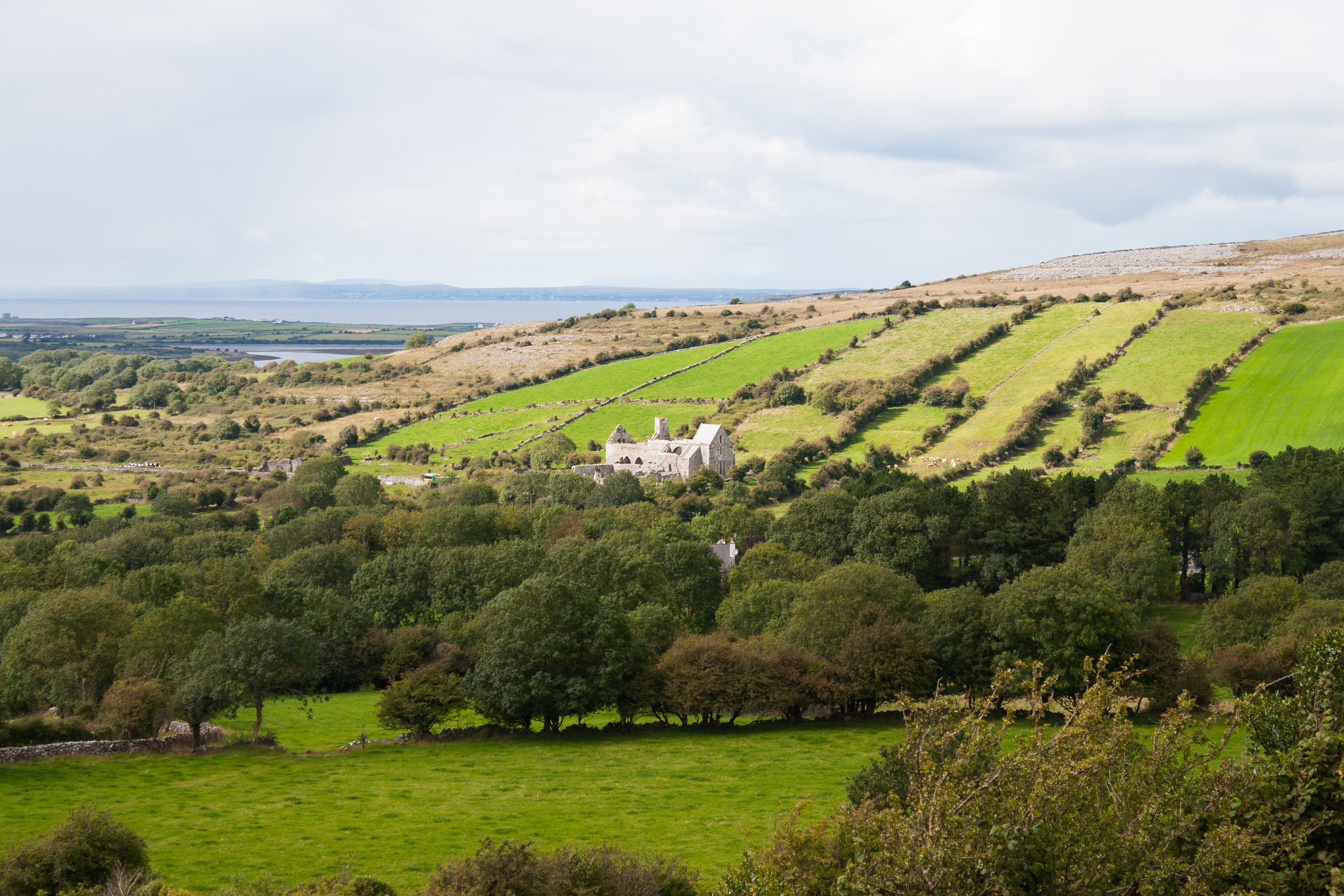
View of Corcomroe from Oughtmama with Galway Bay in the background

A band of Cistercian monks came to the area from the abbey at Inislounaght in County Tipperary in the late 12th century. Sources vary as to the exact founding date (1180–1200). The foundation is attributed either to Donal Mór Ua Briain (Donald O'Brien), the patron of a number of other religious structures in the historic Thomond region, who died in 1194 or his successor Donough Cairbreach. If it is true that Corcomroe established a daughter-house in 1198 at Kilshane (County Limerick) the former is more likely. Alternatively, Kilshane may have been the first attempt by this group of monks to set up a monastery and after that failed in 1200, Corcomroe may have been the site of their second try. On stylistic grounds, the founding is thought to have occurred around 1205–10.

Construction of the abbey used local limestone. Legend maintains that the building was indeed commissioned by King Conor na Siudane Ua Briain (see below). According to the legend, Ua Briain executed the five masons who completed the abbey to prevent them from constructing a rival masterpiece elsewhere.

The documentary evidence on Corcomroe Abbey is scanty. Moreover, since the Cistercians did not engage in pastoral work to the same extent as some other orders, few traditions on the abbey were maintained by local folklore. In 1226, a papal mandate addressed to the Bishop of Kilfenora and the abbot of Corcomroe shows that the abbey was integrated into the Cistercian network at that time and that the abbot was an important functionary in the local church. Another missive, from 1359, concerned the finances of the archdiocese of Tuam and the diocese of Kilmacduagh. In between, in 1228, the relationship with the mother-house at Inislounaght was ended and Corcomroe became subservient to Furness Abbey. This was part of an attempt by the order to bring the more remote houses of the order in Ireland under closer control. In 1227, 1280 and 1287 there were complaints that the abbot of Corcomroe had failed to appear at the General Chapter at Citeaux for a long time.

According to a 15th-century report, in 1268 a battle was fought at Siudáine, close to Corcomroe in which Conor O'Brien (Conor na Siudane Ua Briain), King of Thomond was surprised by Conor Carrach O'Loughlain and slain with many of his retainers. His body was retrieved from the battlefield and buried at Corcomroe by the monks.

Another battle reportedly took place nearby in 1317, when there was internal feuding between the O'Briens and their allies. The abbey was used as a barracks by Dermot O'Brien. By the end of the 14th century, the local area was held by a branch of the O'Cahans (O'Kane or Keane) from Derry in Ulster. It is not clear exactly how this occurred. Earlier that century, the wool trade had boomed but then fell into decline. Selling off or mortgaging land may have been a way tried by the abbey to improve its economic circumstances. In any case, the O'Cahans became stewards of the abbey's lands.

Papal letters of the early 15th century refer to issues around appointments at Kilfenora and Killilagh. In 1419, the abbot John became Bishop of Kilmacduagh. Papal correspondence became more frequent after this time, mostly for reasons of local abuses of order rules notably the ban against marriage. Church dynasties had become quite common in Ireland at that time, and were also present at Corcomroe. Through the 15th century, the abbey and several parishes were controlled by the Tierney family.

These practices of hereditary succession of abbots and use of abbey resources by powerful families resulted in a decline of monasteries' fortunes. The number of monks fell, monastic churches were reduced in size. At Corcomroe, the church was shortened by 13 metres in the 15th century. There is also evidence that suggests that at the time the monks' dormitory had been in disuse.

The English Reformation led to the dissolution of Catholic monasteries in England and Ireland. In 1554, the abbey and its land (15 quarters) was granted to the Earl of Thomond/Baron Inchiquin, Murrough O'Brien. The property is last mentioned in the family papers in 1702, when they were mortgaged By William, Earl of Inchiquin to Donat O'Brien of Dromoland.

The monks continued to tend the fields and maintain the abbey as circumstances allowed, but the political climate led to continued decline.

In 1625, Father Daniel O'Griffy of Dysert O'Dea Monastery was appointed as "commendatory abbot" of Corcomroe, but that may have been purely titular. This was also true of the last abbot, the Reverend John O'Dea, a monk of Salamanca, appointed in 1628.

In 1879, the Office of Public Works acquired the ruins.

== Description ==
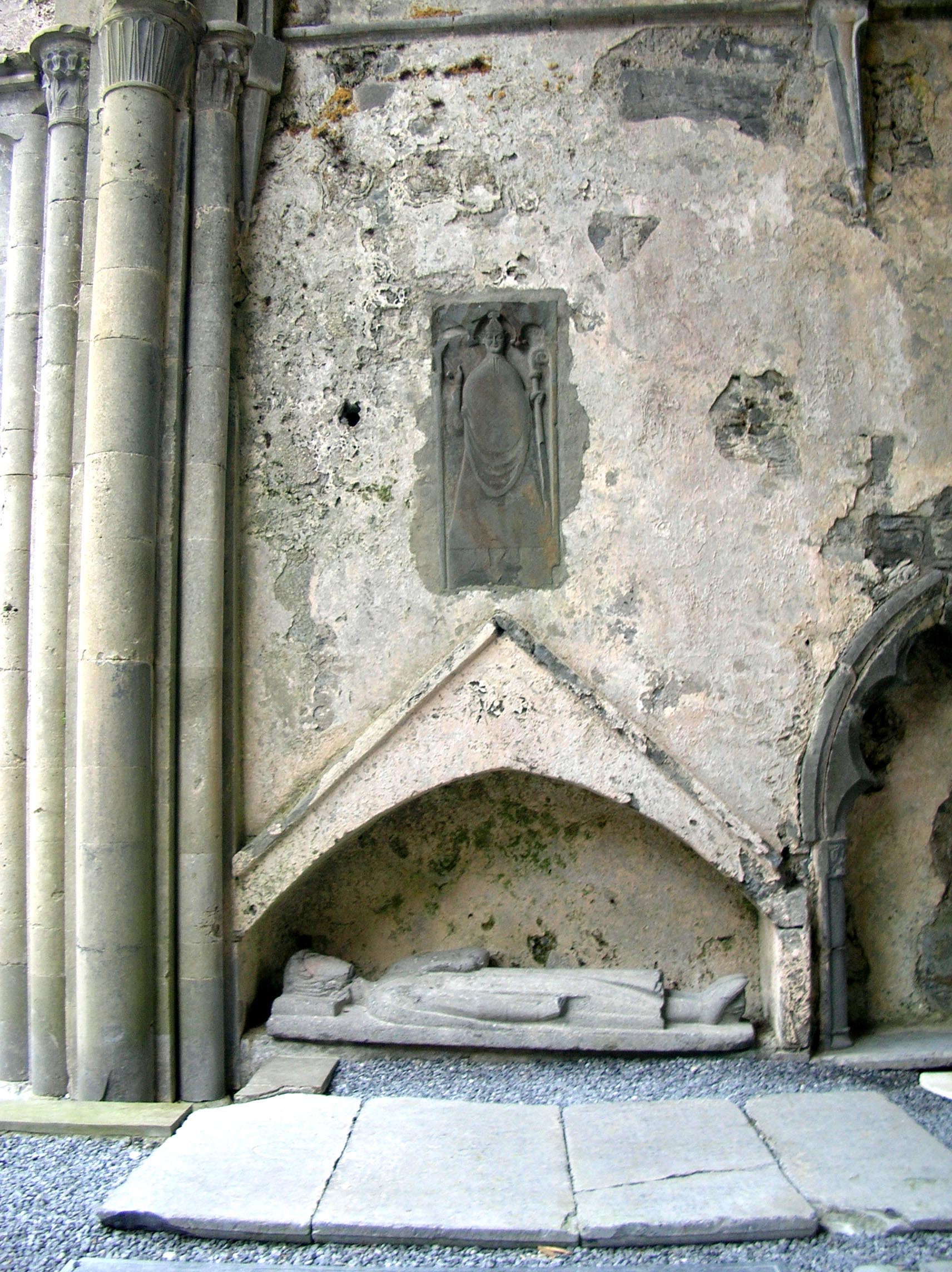
Tomb in the sanctuary with carving of bishop above

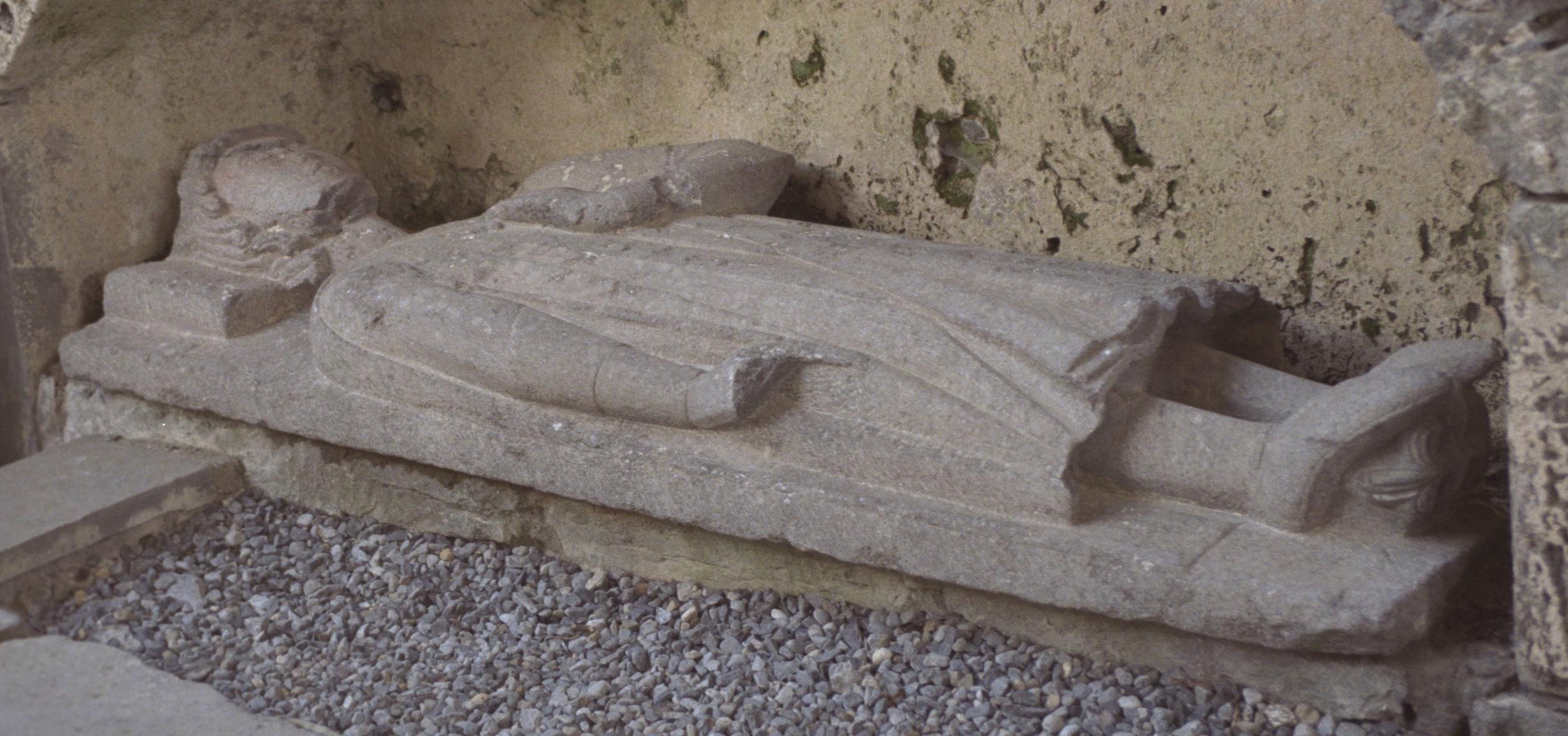
Detail of the tomb effigy of Conor na Siudane Ua Briain.

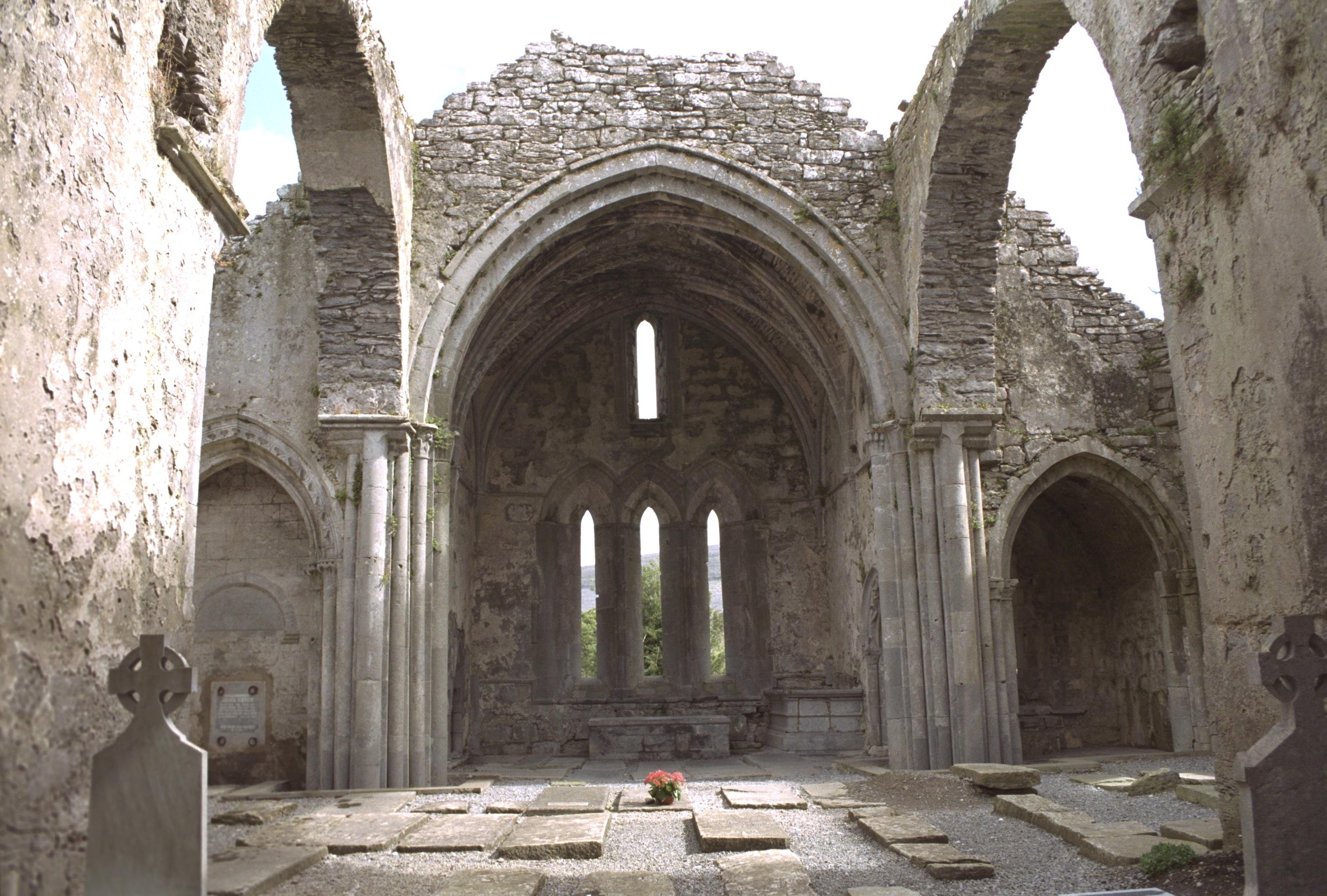
The interior of Corcomroe Abbey, looking east through the choir and into the presbytery.

The construction used the standard plan of Cistercian foundations, but on a reduced scale. The cruciform church, facing east, features just one side chapel in each transept and a small cloister court.

The church, though lacking a roof, is largely intact with an aisled nave (of which the north aisle has all but disappeared or was never completed). Of the abbey's domestic buildings only a few traces remain. However, significant pieces of the high wall surrounding the five acre monastic precinct are still visible. The arched gate through this wall was blown down by a storm in 1839. Its remains and those of a gatehouse lie about 100 meters west of the church.

The abbey is noted for its detailed carvings and other rich ornamentation, which are not commonly found in structures from this period.

This includes columns, capitals and ribs that support the vaulted sanctuary (or choir) ceiling. The sanctuary also contains the tomb of Conor O'Brien (or Conor na Siudane Ua Briain), King of Thomond, located in an arched recess. The limestone effigy (close to life size) is one of the few contemporary representations of an Irish chieftain. Although vandalised in the early 19th century, the monument is in fairly good condition.

A late addition is the Neoclassical "O'Loughlin King of the Burren Family Tomb", from the late 18th or early 19th century. It is located in the floor in front of the recess with Conor O'Brien's tomb.

== Today ==
The abbey today is a public tourist attraction.

== See also ==
- List of abbeys and priories in Ireland (County Clare)

== Sources ==
- Corcomroe Abbey at Clare County Library
- Clements, P. 2011. Burren Country. The Collins Press. ISBN 9781848891173
