= Kilmanaheen =

Civil parish in County Clare, Ireland

Kilmanaheen Cill Mhainchín
- Civil parish
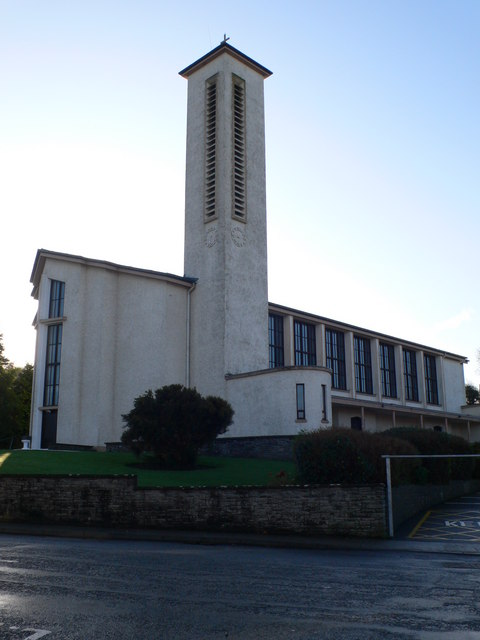
- Roman Catholic Church, Ennistymon, on the Lahinch road

- Location in Ireland
- Coordinates: 52.937414°N 9.325125°W
- Country: Ireland
- Province: Munster
- County: County Clare
- Time zone: UTC+0 (WET)
  - Summer (DST): UTC-1 (IST (WEST))

Kilmanaheen (Irish: Cill Mhainchín) is a civil parish in County Clare, Ireland. It contains the market town of Ennistymon.

== Location ==
Kilmanaheen is named after Saint Mainchín, the patron saint of the diocese of Limerick. It is part of the historical barony of Corcomroe. The parish is 3.75 by 3.25 miles (6.04 by 5.23 km) and covers 8,177 acres (3,309 ha). It includes a detached district of 463 acres (187 ha) about 0.75 miles (1.21 km) to the south of the main part of the parish. Liscannor Bay forms the western boundary. The land is mostly low hills and is suitable for farming. It rises to 510 feet (160 m) on the eastern boundary.

== Antiquities ==
The old church of Kilmanaheen stood on top of a hill in the Lissatunna townland. It has almost vanished now, but the large cemetery surrounding it was still in use in 1897. According to tradition the church stood on the same place as the former Dún, or residence, of Baoth Bronach, King of Corcomroe. He gave the place to Saint Mainchín for the glory of God. There was a castle in Ennistymon, which in 1580 belonged to O’Connor. It has since disappeared.

== Settlements ==
In 1841, the population of the parish was 6,436 in 1,065 houses, of whom 4,494 lived in rural districts.

Kilmanaheen contains the small town of Ennistymon and part of the village of Lahinch. Ennistymon lies at one end of the N85 road from Ennis, and on the N67 road between Galway and Tarbert (via the Shannon Ferry). The river Cullenagh runs through the town. It is near to the edge of the Burren, a scenic area. Ennistymon was a stop on the West Clare Railway until it was closed in the late 1950s. Brian Merriman, the poet, was born in Ennistymon in 1749. Caitlin Macnamara of Ennistymon married the Welsh poet, Dylan Thomas.

== Catholic parish ==
In 1837, the parish was part of the Catholic union or district of Ennistymon, which also included the parish of Clooney, and contained the chapels of Ennistymon, Lahinch, and Kilthomas. Today, the Catholic parish of Ennistymon, which is within the diocese of Galway, Kilmacduagh and Kilfenora, includes the churches of Our Lady and Saint Michael in Ennistymon, Saint Columba in Clouna and the Immaculate Conception in Lahinch.

== Townlands ==
Townlands within the civil parish of Kilmanaheen include Ardnacullia North, Arcnacullia South, Attycristora, Ballingaddy East, Ballingaddy West, Calluragh East, Calluragh South, Calluragh West, Carrowgar, Carrowntedaun, Castlequarter, Cloonaveige, Clooncoul, Clooneybreen, Crag, Deerpark Lower, Deerpark Middle, Deerpark Upper, Deerpark West, Ennistimon, Fahanlunaghta Beg, Fahanlunaghta More, Furraglaun, Glebe, Gortnaclohy, Kilcornan, Knockbrack, Knockpatrick, Lehinch, Lissatunna, Maghera, Rinneen, Shanbally, Sroohil, Tullygarvan East, Tullygarvan West and Woodmount.
