= Archdeacon of Kilfenora =

Senior ecclesiastical officer

Province of Dublin
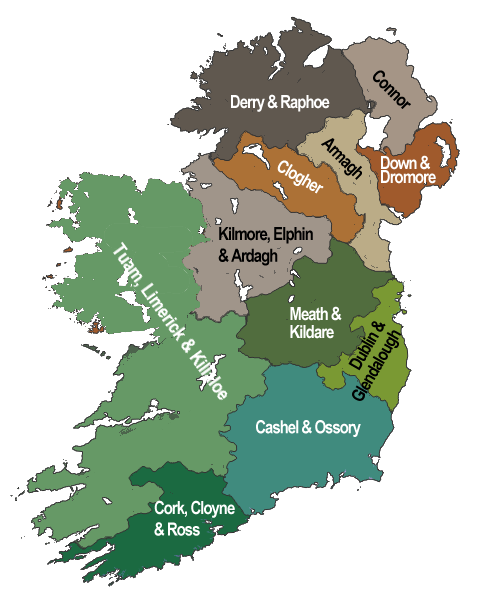
- Church: Church of Ireland
- Metropolitan bishop: Archbishop of Dublin
- Cathedral: Christ Church Cathedral, Dublin
- Dioceses: 5

The Archdeacon of Kilfenora was a senior ecclesiastical officer within the Diocese of Kilfenora until 1643; the Archdiocese of Tuam until 1752; the Diocese of Killaloe and Kilfenora until 1834; and the Diocese of Killaloe and Clonfert until 1923 when it was amalgamated with Killaloe.

The archdeaconry can trace its history back to Charles who held the office in 1302 through to the last discrete holder Arthur Tatton.

== Sources ==
- Cotton, Henry (1850). The Province of Connaught. Fasti Ecclesiae Hiberniae: The Succession of the Prelates and Members of the Cathedral Bodies of Ireland. Vol. 4. Dublin: Hodges and Smith.
- Moody, T. W.; Martin, F. X.; Byrne, F. J., eds. (1984). Maps, Genealogies, Lists: A Companion to Irish History, Part II. A New History of Ireland. Vol. IX. Oxford: Oxford University Press. ISBN 0-19-821745-5.
