= Kilfenora =

Village in County Clare, Ireland

Kilfenora Cill Fhionnúrach
- Village
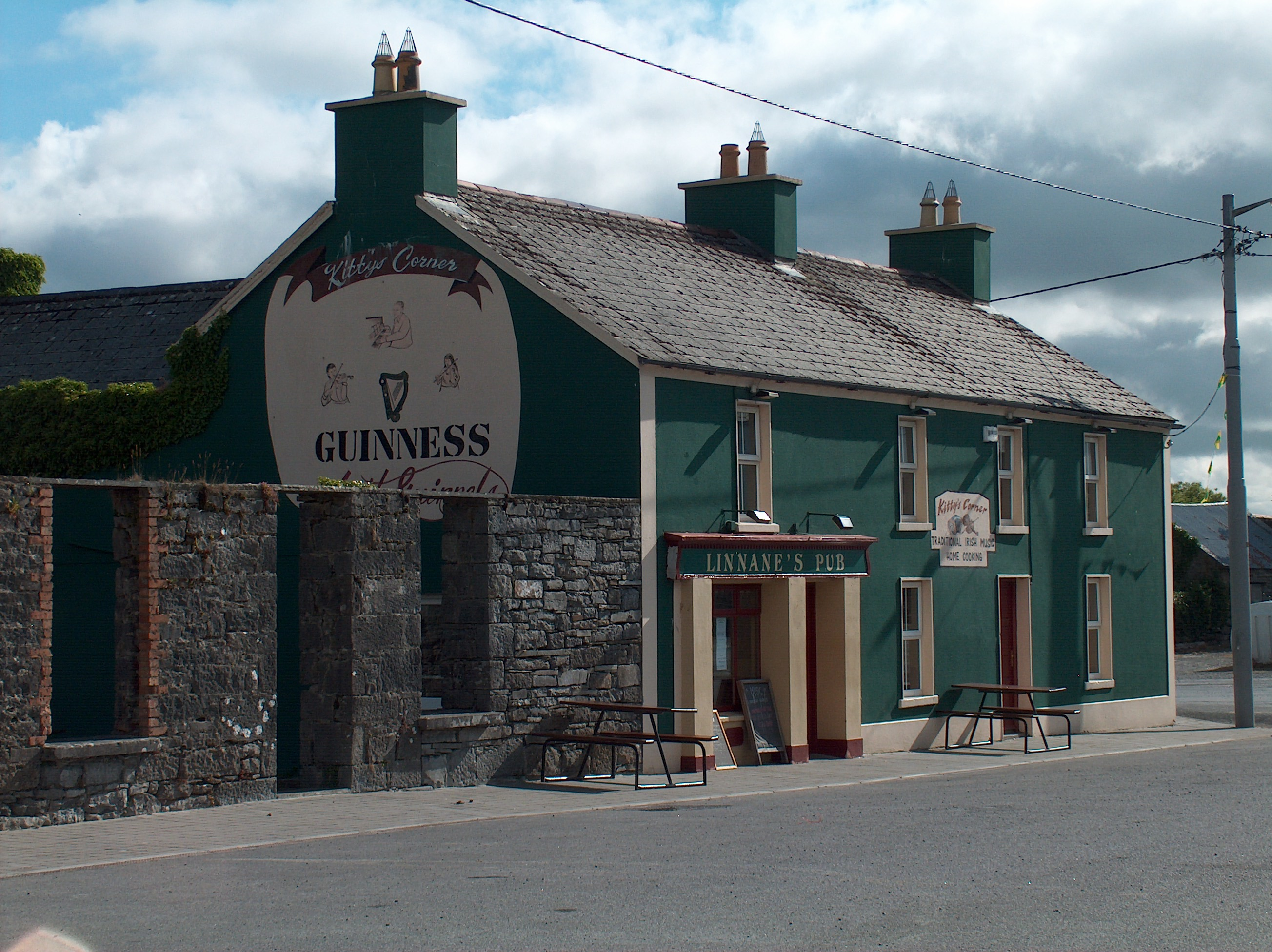
- Main Street

- Location in Ireland
- Coordinates: 52°59′25″N 9°13′0″W
- Country: Ireland
- Province: Munster
- County: County Clare

Population (2022)
  - Total: 152
- Time zone: UTC+0 (WET)
  - Summer (DST): UTC-1 (IST (WEST))
- Irish Grid Reference: R180939

Designations

National monument of Ireland
- Official name: Kilfenora Abbey, cathedral and crosses; Kilfenora church at Kilcarragh
- Reference no.: 7, 8, 9

Kilfenora (Irish: Cill Fhionnúrach [ˌciːl̠ʲ ˈɪn̪ˠuːɾˠəx], meaning 'church of the fertile hillside' or 'church of the white brow') is a village and a civil parish in County Clare, Ireland. It is situated south of the karst limestone region known as the Burren. Since medieval times when it was the episcopal see of the Bishop of Kilfenora, it has been known as the "City of the Crosses" for its seven (now five) high crosses. The village had around 150 inhabitants in 2022. Much of the TV show Father Ted (1995–98) was filmed there.

== Name ==
Cill Fhionnúrach is generally translated as "church of the fertile hillside", "church of the white brow" or "church of the white meadow". The village and diocese of Kilfenora have also been referred to as Fenebore, Kilfenoragh, Finneborensis or Collumabrach.

== Village ==
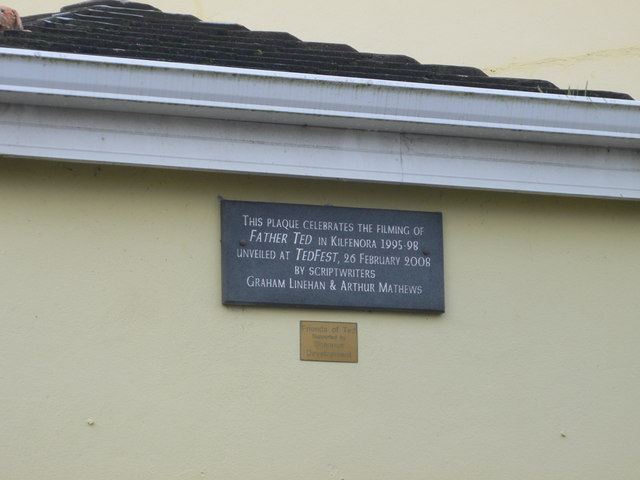
A plaque on the Kilfenora village hall commemorating "Ted Fest"

According to the Census of 2011, 463 people lived in the Kilfenora area, up from 409 in 2006. However, most of them do not live inside the village. In 2011, there were just 220 inhabitants in the village proper, up from 169 in 2006 and only around 100 in 1980. In 1975 the "Burren Display Centre", an interpretative centre displaying the botany and wildlife of The Burren, in the former National School building, was opened by president Cearbhall Ó Dálaigh. It was the first interpretative centre in Ireland and was built with funds from Fáilte Ireland and the Clare County Council.

The TV show Father Ted (1995–98) used Kilfenora as an important filming location. This later gave rise to a "Father Ted Festival", first held in 2007. Kilfenora also gave its name to the Kilfenora Ceili Band.

=== Kilfenora Cathedral ===
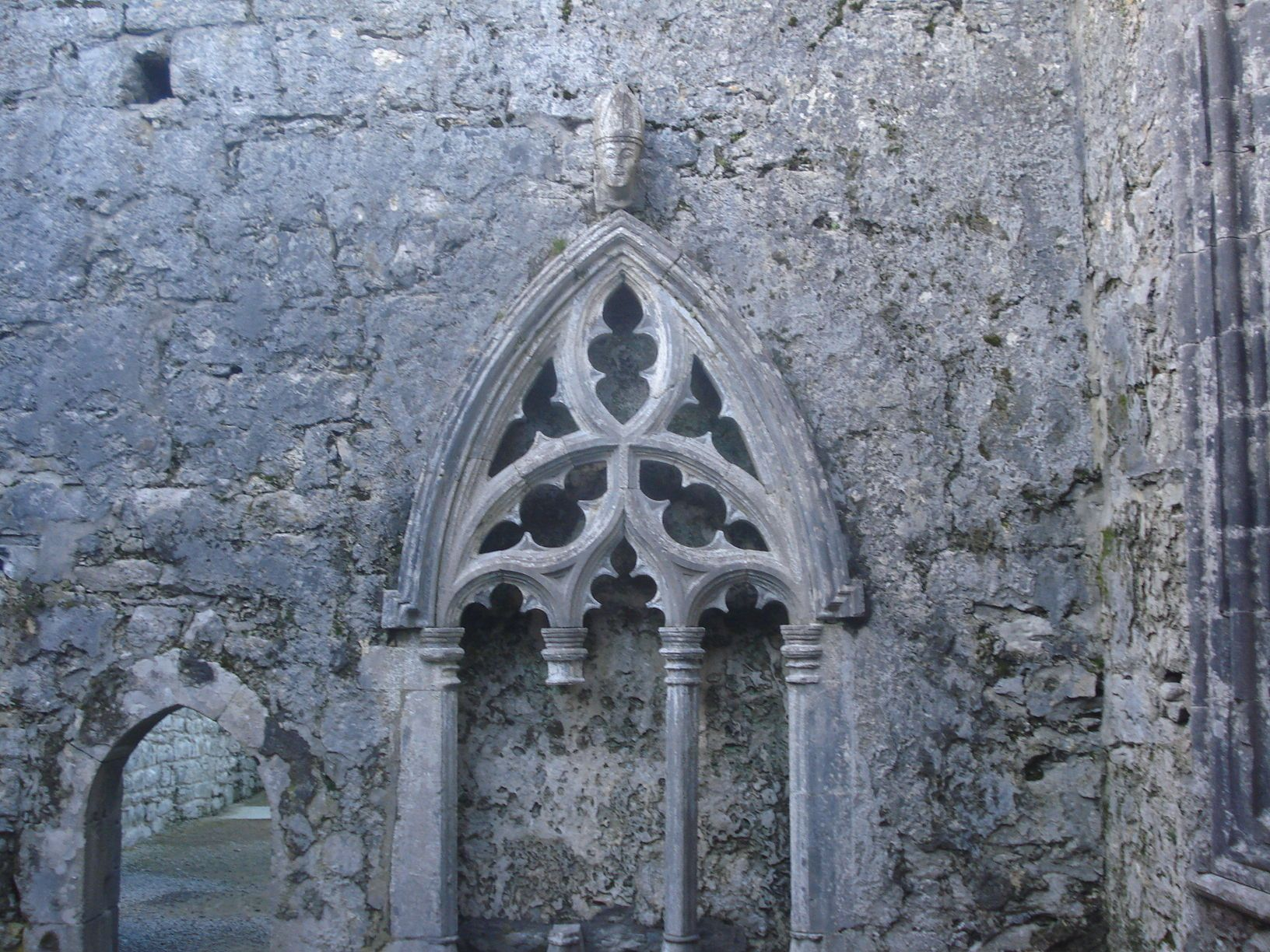
The Gothic sedilia in the chancel of Kilfenora Cathedral

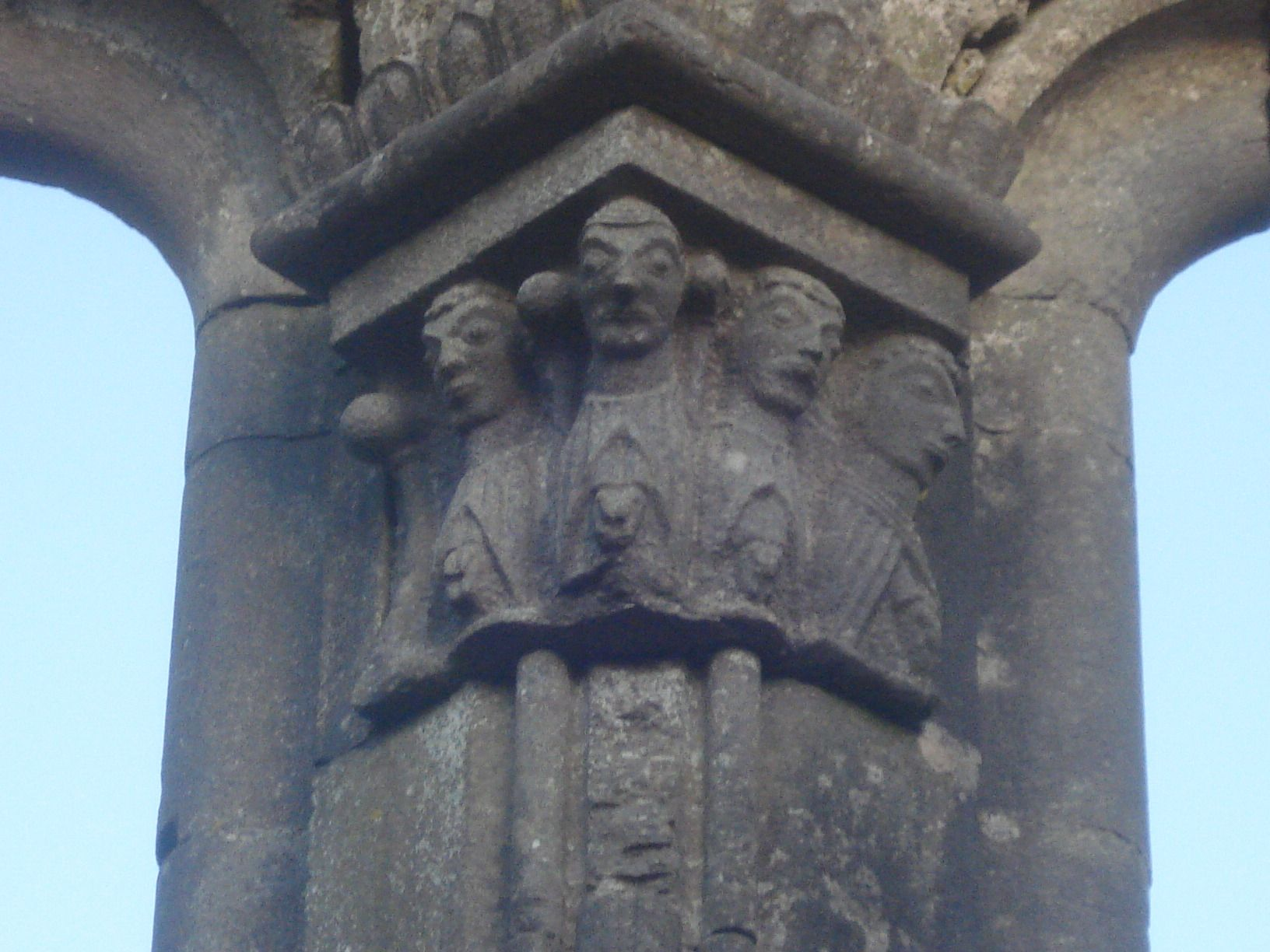
Detail of a pillar on the east window in the chancel of Kilfenora Cathedral

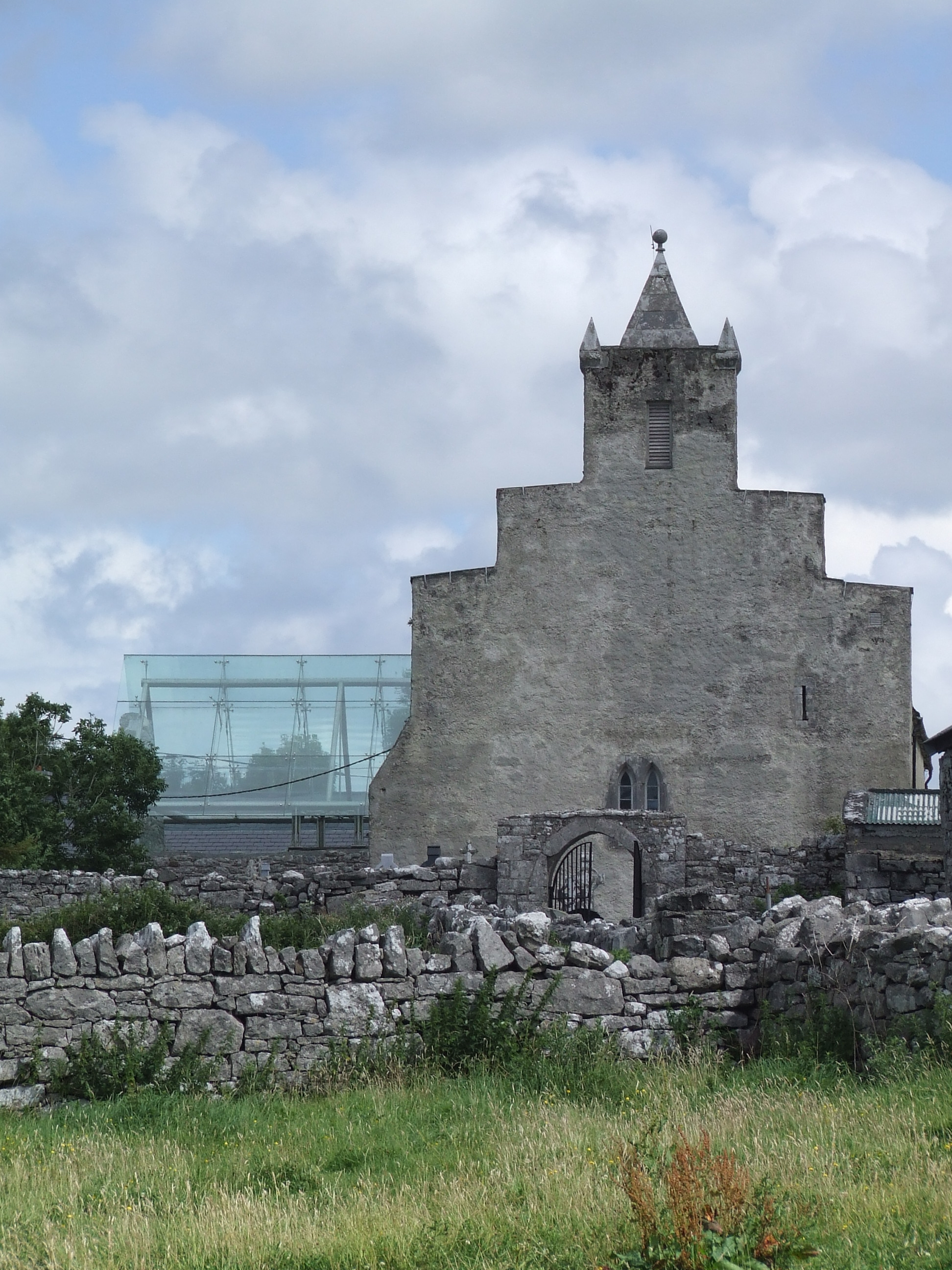
Kilfenora Cathedral. The northern transept is on the left, with the glass roof installed in 2005 to conserve the high crosses.

Kilfenora Cathedral is dedicated to Saint Fachanan, also known as St Fachtna, and the present structure dates to between 1189 and 1200. It was built in the so-called transitional style with a nave and a chancel. These were later separated and by 1839, "thirty-six feet of the east end" were roofless.

The nave is now used for worship by the Church of Ireland, for which it was reconstructed around 1850. It features a bishop's throne, donated in 1981. There is also a large square stone baptismal font (possibly from around 1200). In addition, the church contains various tombs, but the interior is mostly devoid of ornamentation.

According to local tradition, the chancel was roofed with an oak ceiling (blue with a gold star) until the end of the 18th century. It is roofless today and features a 15th-century doorway, a 15th-century Gothic sedilia as well as a Romanesque three-light east window with its triangular pillars topped by carved capitals. On both sides of the window is a carved effigy: a bishop with his right hand raised in blessing (possibly early 14th century), to the north; and a tonsured, bareheaded cleric holding a book (possibly 13th century) to the south. The chancel also contains several tombs and the remains of high crosses.

The "Lady Chapel" (sacristy or chapter room) was in a rectangular wing leading to the north of the chancel. It likely shares the building date of the main building and may have served as a sort of transept in the past. Two lancet-type windows and a broken two-light one are left in the eastern wall. There are also fragments of a high cross.

Today, the cathedral remains in a partially ruined state, although restoration work was done by the National Monument Service in the early 2000s. The transept was fitted with a glass roof in 2005 to protect the remains of the three high crosses moved there.

Although tradition maintains that there were once seven crosses, only the remains of five of them were extant in modern times (plus one from post-reformation times). Three of those, including the one known as the "Doorty Cross", were located within the graveyard of the cathedral. The Doorty Cross is so named because its shaft was used as the tombstone of the Doorty family grave until the 1950s when the two parts of this mid-12th century cross were reunited. A shaft of a 13th- or 14th-century cross stood near the doorway of the cathedral (the "South Cross"). Near the graveyard, gate was a simple cross (possibly dating from the 14th or 15th century). The third cross is located within the chancel. West of the graveyard and roughly halfway between the cathedral and the modern Catholic church is the fourth high cross (the "High Cross"), standing in a field. The fifth cross ("Cross on the Hill") was removed in 1821, by Dr Richard Mant, Bishop of Kilfenora and Killaloe, to Killaloe, County Clare where it is still on display at St. Flannan's Cathedral and known as the "Kilfenora High Cross".

In 2003, three high crosses from the site were removed for conservation by the Office of Public Works and from 2005 have been on display in the transept of the cathedral; amongst them the "Doorty Cross".

=== Other antiquities ===
The ruins of Ballyshanny Castle are located in the eponymous townland, around 600 meters from the village. It was built in a ringfort and was originally an O'Brien castle. In 1631 it was owned by Daniel O'Shanny, Dean of Kilfenora. Remains of two upper floors and a vaulted lower floor are still extant.

To the west of Ballyshanny, in Ballykeel South townland, lie the outhouses of the Ballykeel estate, one of the few "big houses" in northwestern Clare. It was originally built by George Lysaght of Woodmount, Ennistymon in the late 18th century. It was replaced in the early 19th century by the Blake Foster family with a classical house of cut stone with a central bow.

A large ring fort surrounded by chevaux de frise in Ballykinvarga townland is named after the townland. The fort itself has a diameter of over 50 meters but has not been conclusively dated. Due to its size it has been considered the likely seat of a regional "cattle baron", and was described in detail by antiquarian Thomas Johnson Westropp in 1897.

=== Burren Centre ===
The former Burren Display Centre today provides an updated exhibition on the Burren, a film, tea rooms and a craft store.

== Civil parish ==
Kilfenora civil parish is on the east side of barony of Corcomroe. The parish is 5.3 by 5 miles (8.5 by 8.0 km) and covers 10,776 acres (4,361 ha). In 1845, the "Parliamentary Gazette" reported that about one-half of the surface is prime fattening-ground; about one-fourth is excellent rearing and tillage-land; and the remainder is mountain and bog, but only to a small extent unprofitable. The land, while of good quality, is also better cultivated than that of the adjacent districts on the south.

=== Townlands ===
This is a list of townlands in the parish: Ballagh, Ballybaun, Ballybreen, Ballyclancahill, Ballygoonaun, Ballyhomulta, Ballykeel North, Ballykeel South, Ballykinvarga, Ballyshanny, Boghil, Caherminnaun East, Caherminnaun West, Clogher, Clooneen, Cloonomra, Cohy, Commonage, Coolpeekaun, Creggaun, Doon, Fanta Glebe, Kilcarragh, Kilfenora, Laraghakea, Lickeen East, Lickeen West, Lisdoony East, Lisdoony West, Lisket, Maryville, Roughan, Slievenagry, Tullagh Lower and Tullagh Upper.

=== History ===
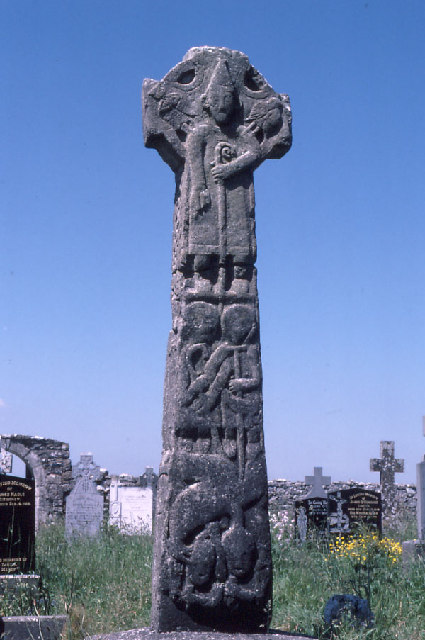
The "Doorty Cross" in the graveyard of Kilfenora Cathedral in the 1980s

Kilfenora is "one of the oldest urban settlements" in County Clare. According to tradition, the ecclesial presence at Kilfenora began with Saint Fachanan, who founded a church here in the 6th century. The first building was probably made of wood and followed by a stone construction. That church was burned down in 1055 by Murchad O'Brien. It was rebuilt between 1056 and 1058, only to be plundered in 1079 and then destroyed by an accidental fire in 1100. In 1152, the Synod of Kells changed the status of the ecclesial settlement here from monastic to diocesan. The diocese corresponded with the ancient territory of Corcomroe.

Part of the Archdiocese of Cashel, it only extended over 200 square miles of very thinly populated land. It was reckoned the poorest diocese, with only 13 parishes. Demand for the position of bishop thus was not great, but for 1189 a bishop is recorded. In 1660, Samuel Pullen was made Archbishop of Tuam and Kilfenora became part of his province.

Kilfenora was the site of the largest fair in north Clare, held here on 9 October from late mediaeval times until the early 19th century. Of this an old paying stand is still extant next to the field known as "Fair Green" east of the R476 road.

The last Bishop of Kilfenora in the succession of the Roman Catholic Church was James Augustine O'Daly (d. 1749). In 1750, the diocese was united with Kilmacduagh. In 1883 "Kilfenora and Kilmacduagh" was again merged with the diocese of Galway. Today, the bishops of Galway and Kilmacduagh are styled "Bishop of Galway and Kilmacduagh and Apostolic Administrator of Kilfenora"; while the bishop administers the diocese, in Canon Law, the ordinary of the diocese is the Pope.

In the Church of Ireland, Kilfenora was merged in turn with the dioceses of Limerick (1606–07), Tuam (1617-1742), Clonfert (1742-1752), Killaloe (1752-1976) and again Limerick (since 1976).

From the late 17th century Kilfenora went into decline and the Catholic population suffered under the Penal Laws. Attempts by the clergy to support their parishioners led to confrontations with the temporal authorities. In 1712, the High Sheriff of Clare ordered the arrest of the entire clergy at Kilfenora on the suspicion of turning a blind eye to the laming of landowner cattle by malcontents. After the 1798 uprising, a local priest, Father Charles Carrick was briefly jailed for supporting the rebels.

By 1837, Samuel Lewis described Kilfenora as "a decayed market town" of 558 people, linked by a new road to Lisdoonvarna and Ennistymon. After the West Clare Railway in 1887 connected Ennistymon, but not Kilfenora, to the rest of the country by rail, the latter's decline into a backwater was hastened. As of 1841, the population of the parish was 3,266 in 522 houses.

In 1942, a survey by the Irish Tourist Association found that the town had 100 inhabitants and "seven public houses, ten groceries, a Post Office, a Guard's Barracks [and] a National School". It also noted that around 60 men were employed by a phosphate mine and that Kilfenora was "a very important village for cattle and sheep fairs".

== Ecclesiastical parish ==
=== Protestant Parish ===
In 1837, the nave portion of the cathedral was adopted for use as the Protestant parish church for Kilfenora. It is still used for occasional worship.

=== Catholic Parish ===
In the Roman Catholic Church, the ecclesiastical parish is merged with the civil parish of Kiltoraght. There are two churches in this parish: St. Fachtna's (in Kilfenora) and St Attracta's (Kiltoraght).

== See also ==
- Dean of Kilfenora
- List of abbeys and priories in the Republic of Ireland (County Clare)
- List of towns and villages in Ireland
