= Bishop of Kilfenora =

Former episcopal title in Ireland

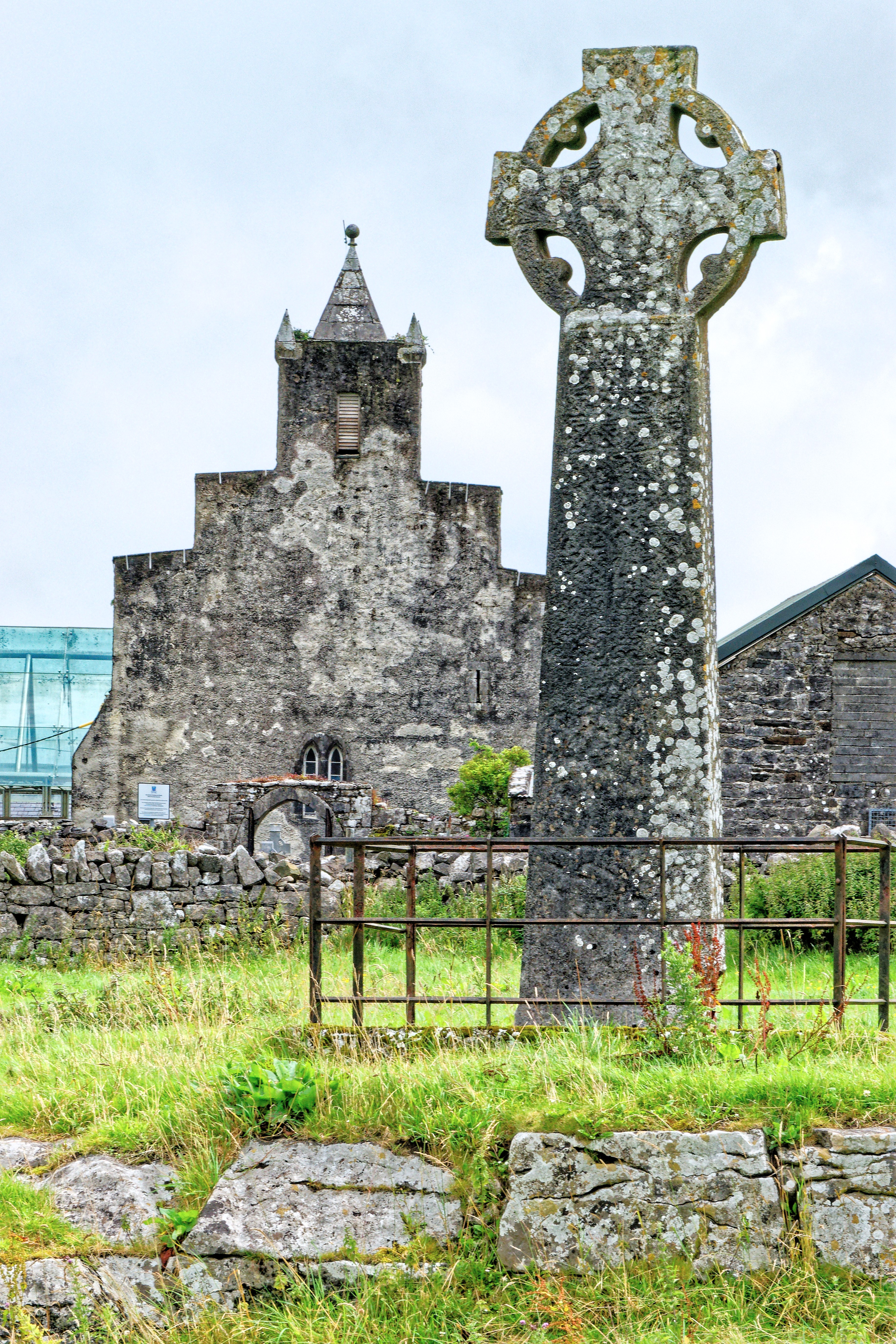
St. Fachtnan`s Cathedral, Kilenora.

The Bishop of Kilfenora (Irish: Easpag Chill Fhionnúrach) was a distinct episcopal title which took its name from the village of Kilfenora in County Clare in the Republic of Ireland. In both the Catholic Church and the Church of Ireland, the title is now united with other bishoprics.

== History ==
The monastery at Kilfenora was reportedly founded by Saint Fachanan in the sixth century. It was not until March 1152 that the diocese of Kilfenora was established at the Synod of Kells. The diocese corresponded with the ancient territory of Corcomroe. Part of the Archdiocese of Cashel, it only extended over 200 square miles of very thinly populated land. It was reckoned the poorest diocese, with only 13 parishes. Demand for the position of bishop thus was not great, but for 1189 a bishop is recorded. In 1660, Samuel Pullen was made Archbishop of Tuam and Kilfenora became part of his province.

After the Reformation, there were parallel paths of succession. The Catholic bishopric of Kilfenora continued as a separate title until 1750 when Pope Benedict XIV decreed that it be united with the bishopric of Kilmacduagh. Since Kilmacduagh was in the ecclesiastical province of Tuam while Kilfenora was in the Province of Cashel, it was arranged that the ordinary of the united dioceses was to be alternately bishop of one diocese and apostolic administrator of the other. The first holder of this unusual arrangement was Peter Kilkelly, who had been Bishop of Kilmacduagh since 1744, and became Apostolic Administrator of Kilfenora in September 1750. In 1866, Patrick Fallon, the sitting Bishop of Kilmacduagh and Apostolic Administrator of Kilfenora, resigned due to ill health, and John McEvilly, the Bishop of Galway, was appointed Apostolic Administrator of both Kilmacduagh and Kilfenora. McEvilly would be named Coadjutor Archbishop of Tuam in 1878 but retained his duties in Galway until he eventually succeeded to the Tuam archdiocesan throne in 1881. Upon McEvilly's succession in Tuam, the three sees of Galway, Kilmacduagh, and Kilfenora remained vacant for two years. In 1883, Pope Leo XIII combined the dioceses of Galway and Kilmacduagh into a unified see, and made the Bishop of Galway and Kilmacduagh Apostolic Administrator of Kilfenora in perpetuum.

In the Church of Ireland, Kilfenora continued as a separate see until it was combined with Killaloe to form the united bishopric of Killaloe and Kilfenora in 1752. Under the Church Temporalities (Ireland) Act 1833 (3 & 4 Will. 4. c. 37), the united see became one of the sees held by bishops of Killaloe and Clonfert in 1834. Since 1976, Kilfenora has been one of the sees held by the bishops of Limerick and Killaloe.

== Pre-Reformation bishops ==
Pre-Reformation Bishops of Kilfenora
From	Until	Incumbent	Notes
bef.1172	unknown	(Name not known)	Took the oath of fealty to King Henry II of England in 1172
bef.1205	unknown	F.	Elected before 1205
bef.1224	unknown	John	Elected before 1224; also known as Johannes
1251/54	1255	Christian	Known to be bishop fl. 1251 and 1254; died before December 1255; also known as Christianus
unknown	1264	(Name not known)	Died on 28 February 1264
1266	1273	Maurice	Elected after 3 March 1265 and consecrated before 12 February 1266; died before 14 July 1273; also known as Mauricius and called by some as Henry
1273	1281	Florence Ó Tigernaig, O.S.A.	Formerly Abbot of Kilsanne; elected bishop before 18 September 1273; died before 12 July 1281; also known as Florentius
1281	1298	Congalach Ó Lochlainn	Formerly Dean of Kilfenora; elected bishop before 6 September 1281; died before 21 December 1298; also known as Carolus
1300	1302	Simon Ó Cuirrin	Elected on 16 May and confirmed on 22 July 1300; died on 26 December 1302
1303	1319	Maurice Ó Briain	Formerly Dean of Kilfenora; elected bishop sometime between 16 March and 10 June 1303; died in office
1323	1359	Risdeard Ó Lochlainn	Consecrated on 17 April 1323; died on 3 February 1359; also known as Richard O'Loghlain
unknown	1372	Denis	Died before October 1372; also known as Dionysius
1372	unknown	Henry	Appointed on 6 October 1372; also known as Henricus
unknown	c.1389	Cornelius	Died in office circa 1389
1390	1421	Patrick	Elected before 28 February and appointed on that date; consecrated after 19 March 1390; died before 15 January 1421; also known as Patricius
1421	1433	Feidhlimidh mac Mathghamhna Ó Lochlainn	Appointed on 15 January 1421; consecrated after 6 February 1421; died before 7 August 1433; also known as Florentius or Florence O'Loughlin
1433	1434	Fearghal	Appointed on 7 August 1433; died before 17 November 1434
1434	1491	Denis Ó Connmhaigh	Appointed on 17 November and consecrated on 26 December 1434; resigned on 12 December 1491; also known as Denis O'Cahan or in Latin as Dionysius
1491	1541	Muircheartach mac Murchadha Ó Briain	Formerly a Canon of Kilfenora; appointed bishop on 12 December 1491; Papal bulls expediated on 26 August 1492; died before 21 November 1541; also known as Maurice O'Brien or in Latin as Mauricius
1514	c.1541	Maurice O'Kelly	Appointed 6 November 1514; died in office circa 1541
1541	1572	John O'Nialain	Appointed by Pope Paul III on 21 November 1541, but seems to have accepted royal supremacy since he was recognised by King Henry VIII; died in 1572; also recorded as John O'Neylan

== Post-Reformation bishops ==
=== Catholic succession ===
Roman Catholic Bishops of Kilfenora
From	Until	Incumbent	Notes
1572	1629	See vacant	
1629	unknown	(Daniel Gryphaeus)	Appointed vicar general in 1629 and vicar apostolic by Papal brief on 1 April 1631
1647	c.1673	Andrew Lynch	Appointed on 11 March and consecrated on 21 April 1647; died circa 1673
1673	1722	See vacant	
1722	unknown	William O'Daly	He was vicar general of Kilfenora before appointed bishop on 7 August 1722; date of death unknown
1726	1749	James Augustine O'Daly, O.S.A.	Appointed on 27 July 1726; died on 20 August 1749
1750	1883	See part of the united bishopric of Kilmacduagh and Kilfenora	
since 1883		See part of the united diocese of Galway, Kilmacduagh and Kilfenora	

=== Church of Ireland succession ===
Church of Ireland Bishops of Kilfenora
From	Until	Incumbent	Notes
1572	1606	See vacant	
1606	1617	See held in commendam by Bernard Adams, Bishop of Limerick	
1617	1622	John Steere	Formerly Archdeacon of Emly; nominated on 9 July and consecrated on 26 August 1617; translated to Ardfert and Aghadoe on 20 July 1622
1622	1627	William Murray	Formerly Chaplain-in-Ordinary to King James I & VI; nominated on 15 March and consecrated on 18 December 1622; translated to Llandaff on 24 December 1627
1628		Richard Betts	Chaplain-in-Ordinary to King James I & VI; appointed by letters patent on 19 September 1628, but when he arrived in Ireland and learned of the poverty of the see, he declined the appointment and left without consecration
1628	1630	See vacant	
1630	1638	James Heygate	Formerly Archdeacon of Clogher; nominated on 28 February and consecrated on 9 May 1630; died on 30 April 1638
1638	1643	Robert Sibthorp	Formerly Treasurer of Killaloe and Prebendary of Maynooth, in St Patrick's Cathedral, Dublin; nominated on 19 June and consecrated on 11 November 1638; translated to Limerick in 1643
1643	1661	See vacant	
1661	1741	See held in commendam by the Archbishops of Tuam	
1742	1752	See held in commendam by John Whitcombe, Bishop of Clonfert and Kilmacduagh	
1752	1834	See part of the united bishopric of Killaloe and Kilfenora	
1834	1976	See part of the united bishopric of Killaloe and Clonfert	
since 1976		See part of the united bishopric of Limerick and Killaloe	

== Bibliography ==
- Brady, W. Maziere (1876). The Episcopal Succession in England, Scotland and Ireland, A.D. 1400 to 1875. Vol. 2. Rome: Tipografia Della Pace.
- Cotton, Henry (1851). The Province of Munster. Fasti Ecclesiae Hiberniae: The Succession of the Prelates and Members of the Cathedral Bodies of Ireland. Vol. 1 (2nd ed.). Dublin: Hodges and Smith.
- Fryde, E. B.; Greenway, D. E.; Porter, S.; Roy, I., eds. (1986). Handbook of British Chronology (3rd, reprinted 2003 ed.). Cambridge: Cambridge University Press. ISBN 0-521-56350-X.
- Moody, T. W.; Martin, F. X.; Byrne, F. J., eds. (1984). Maps, Genealogies, Lists: A Companion to Irish History, Part II. New History of Ireland. Vol. 9. Oxford: Oxford University Press. ISBN 0-19-821745-5.
