= Clonfert College =

- Coláiste Chluain Fearta

Location
- Garbally Demesne, Ballinasloe, County Galway; Ireland; 53.323169°N 8.247158°W

Information
- Type: Voluntary secondary school
- Motto: Rich Traditions, Bright Future
- Religious affiliation: Roman Catholic
- Established: 1 September 2025
- Principal: Pauric Hanlon
- Patrons: Michael Duignan; Bishop of Clonfert; Maeve Mahon; Chief Executive of CEIST
- Enrollment: 940 (2025)
- Campuses: Garbally Campus; Mackney Campus
- Colour
- Trusteeship: Bishop of Clonfert; Catholic Education an Irish Schools Trust (CEIST)
- Website: www.clonfertcollege.ie

Clonfert College (Irish: Coláiste Chluain Fearta) is an Irish Catholic co-educational secondary school situated in Ballinasloe, County Galway. It opened in September 2025 as a result of the amalgamation of Garbally College and Ardscoil Mhuire and operates between two campuses in Garbally Park and Mackney respectively. It is under the dual trusteeship of the Bishop of Clonfert and Catholic Education an Irish Schools Trust (CEIST).

== History ==
In early 2023, a consultation process began for Garbally College and Ardscoil Mhuire regarding the future of Catholic secondary school provision within Ballinasloe, conducted by their patrons the Diocese of Clonfert and the Catholic Education an Irish Schools Trust (CEIST). In October 2023, it was announced that the two schools would be amalgamated to form a new co-educational school which would open in September 2025. Planning for the amalgamation began the following month with the forming of a steering committee comprising representatives of the schools' patrons, staff and parents.

Clonfert College was announced as the name of the school in March 2024, reflecting the historical and religious origins of the two former schools, with Pauric Hanlon, then-principal of Ardscoil Mhuire, appointed principal of the school in June 2024. Three deputy principals were appointed in early 2025.

Prior to amalgamation, Garbally College and Ardscoil Mhuire had collaborated on co-educational initiatives, including joint musical theatre productions and the sharing of co-curricular resources at Transition Year and senior cycle levels.

A multimillion-euro development was sanctioned by the Department of Education to further develop facilities on the school's two campuses, which would provide additional technology, art and special education suites and sanitary space. In March 2025, it was announced that Clonfert College had been granted DEIS status and that six special education classrooms and four STEM classrooms would be delivered.

In May 2025, a group of Garbally College alumni launched a campaign to preserve Garbally College's legacy in the amalgamated school's name, calling for the adoption of the name 'Clonfert College at Garbally Park' and for the school's sports teams to continue playing under the name 'Garbally'. A survey was conducted to assess support for the petition, with 88% of respondents backing to retain the Garbally name, including former Ireland rugby captain Ciaran Fitzgerald, ex-rugby international Noel Mannion, Connacht Rugby scrum-half Colm Reilly, a son of former Garbally College principal Stephen Reilly, Galway hurlers Iggy Clarke, Seán Silke, Conor Hayes, Michael Duignan and Damien Joyce. In June 2025, the Board of Management of Clonfert College confirmed in a statement that Garbally would not be retained, stating it would "elevate" one founding school over the other. The group said it was "deeply disappointed" by the decision and that it was a "missed opportunity".

Clonfert College opened on 1 September 2025.

== Curriculum ==
The school offers both the Junior and Leaving Certificate cycles, as well as Transition Year, Leaving Certificate Vocational Programme and Leaving Certificate Applied. Clonfert College offers all the mandatory subjects, along with business studies, home economics, technical graphics, music, modern foreign languages and science, technology, engineering, and mathematics.
