= Aoibheann Reilly =

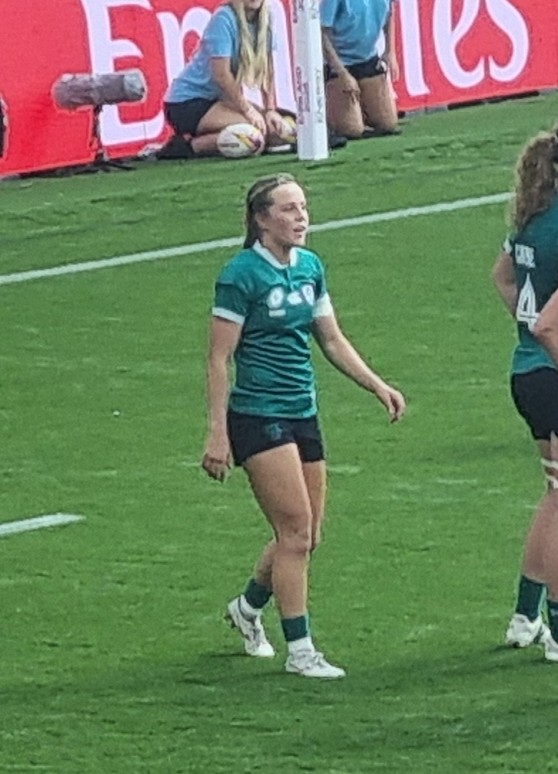
- Reilly during the 2025 Rugby World Cup in Northampton
- Born: 1 November 2000 (age 26) Ballinasloe, County Galway
- Height: 163 cm (5 ft 4 in)
- School: Ardscoil Mhuire
- Notable relative: Colm Reilly (brother)

Rugby union career
- Position: Scrum-half
- Current team: Blackrock College RFC
Senior career
Years	Team	Apps	(Points)
	Blackrock College RFC		(0)
International career
Years	Team	Apps	(Points)
2022–	Ireland	19	(0)
- Correct as of 14 September 2025
National sevens team
Years	Team		Comps
2021–	Ireland		

Aoibheann Reilly (born 1 November 2000) is an Irish rugby union player. She represents Ireland at 15-a-side and Sevens rugby as a scrum-half.

== Early life ==
Reilly began playing rugby for the Ballinasloe U12 Community Games team. She has been a long time teammate and friend of Beibhinn Parsons having attended primary and secondary school together before going on to play rugby for Ireland together. Her brother Colm Reilly is a scrum-half for Connacht Rugby. Her father Stephen Reilly is a former principal of Garbally College.

== Career ==
Reilly played domestically for Connacht before impressing for Blackrock College RFC in the All Ireland League.

She was named in the starting XV for Ireland for the first time in March 2022 in the Women's Six Nations Championship test match against Wales. She was named as part of the Ireland sevens team for the Rugby Sevens World Cup held in Cape Town, South Africa in September 2022.

Reilly suffered her first serious knee injury to her cruciate ligament in the autumn of 2023 and having come back to full fitness then suffered a second ACL tear in the 2024 SVNS Grand Final in Madrid, ruling her out of the 2024 Olympic Games. She returned to action in March 2025. Reilly was named in Ireland's squad for the 2025 Six Nations Championship in March. She made her comeback in an Ireland shirt as a replacement during Ireland's opening Six Nations fixture against France in Belfast. The following week she returned to the starting line-up for their fixture away against Italy.

She was named in the Irish squad to the 2025 Rugby World Cup in England.

== Personal life ==
She is a qualified sports scientist.
