= Creagh National School =

- Scoil Mhuire Gan Smál

Location
- Ballinasloe, County Galway; Ireland
- 53.3281°N 8.2012°W

Information
- Type: Primary school
- Religious affiliation: Roman Catholic
- Established: 1939
- Principal: Áine Ní Cholleráin (Bleahene)
- Patron: Michael Duignan
- Enrollment: 440 (2023)
- Language: English
- Website: creaghnsonline.com

Creagh National School (Irish: Scoil Mhuire Gan Smál) is a primary school in Ballinasloe, County Galway, Ireland. Originally founded in 1939, it is a Catholic boys and girls national school located on the outskirts of Ballinasloe in the civil parish of Creagh. As of 2019, the school had 415 pupils and approximately thirty staff, making it the largest national school (by number of pupils) in the Ballinasloe catchment area.

== History and development ==
Creagh National School was opened in 1939 in Creagh outside Ballinasloe, initially with just two teachers and 87 pupils. First opened down the Creagh Road, the school was moved to the current location in 1939.

Later developments include the "two million construction project", which involved the development or extension of six mainstream classrooms, five tutorial rooms, an extension to the school hall and a library. Begun in 2009, the school marked the official opening of the extensions in September 2012. A new astro-turf pitch was opened to coincide with the school's 75th anniversary celebrations in 2014.

In June 2023, a funding allocation of almost €700,000 was approved in order to provide two new modular classrooms at the school, including their first ever special education class. The classrooms were completed in November and opened by the Minister of State for Special Education Josepha Madigan.

As of 2021, Áine Ní Cholleráin (Bleahene) was the acting principal of Creagh National School.

== Events and fundraising ==
A St Brigid's cross fundraiser is held on 1 February, St Brigid's Day, every year. Other fundraising events include Christmas singalong, cake sale, and confirmation fundraisers, with much of the money raised going to causes in Tanzania.

With pupils from 27 different cultural backgrounds, the school participates in the Yellow Flag diversity programme, and celebrated two "intercultural days" in 2019.

== Notable alumni ==
- Beibhinn Parsons, Ireland women's rugby union international
- Shane Jennings, rugby union player
- Colm Reilly, rugby union player
- Heather Payne, women's footballer playing for the Ireland national team
