= Garbally House =

Country house in Ballinasloe

Garbally House is a country house in Ireland built by the Lord Clancarty in the 17th century. It has two floors and fine views over Ballinasloe. It is situated beside Garbally College (Garbally Court), which was an all-boys secondary school in Ballinasloe, County Galway. It has an obelisk, pond, steps, nicknamed the 40 steps, that have no current use but were previously one of many entrances into the vast estate, and a system of tunnels that are now closed on its grounds. It is owned by the Roman Catholic Diocese of Clonfert and is inhabited by a local priest who serves as a groundskeeper.

It was once used as a hospital by the English, after the Battle of Aughrim in 1691. Following the secession of the Irish Free State from the United Kingdom in 1921, the House along with the surrounding land which constituted Garbally Park was sold to the Roman Catholic Diocese of Clonfert, transferring ownership of all fixed assets to the Catholic Church. The following year St. Joseph's College, the diocesan second-level school of Clonfert, moved its premises to Garbally Park, henceforth being commonly referred to as Garbally College. The college had boarders who lived at the House until boarding ended in 2008.
