= John Dignan =

- Bishop of Clonfert
- Church: Catholic Church
- Diocese: Diocese of Clonfert
- In office: 24 March 1924 – 12 April 1953
- Predecessor: Thomas O'Doherty
- Successor: William Philbin

Orders
- Ordination: 6 September 1903
- Consecration: 1 June 1924 by Thomas Gilmartin

Personal details
- Born: 13 June 1880 Ballygar, County Galway, United Kingdom of Great Britain and Ireland
- Died: 12 April 1953 (aged 72) Loughrea, County Galway, Ireland

John Dignan (13 June 1880 – 12 April 1953) was Bishop of Clonfert from 1924 until his death in 1953, a committed social reformer and initiator of early debates about social welfare provision in the early decades of newly-independent Ireland.

== Early life and priestly ministry ==
Dignan was a native of Ballygar, County Galway and educated locally at Esker, near Athenry, later attending St. Patrick's College, Maynooth, where he was ordained a priest for the Diocese of Clonfert on 6 September 1903. His first appointment was to the staff of St. Joseph's College at Ballinasloe, where he served for twelve years, ten of them as President.

A staunch nationalist, he had served in 1917 as president of the east Galway board of the Sinn Féin executive and was a central figure in the organisation of Sinn Féin courts in the county.

In 1919 he became administrator of the parish of Abbey, Loughrea, becoming its parish priest in 1921. While there his house was raided and bombed by the Black and Tans, who targeted him as a known supporter of the independence movement. In 1923 he was appointed Parish Priest of Killimore but served only a short time before receiving his episcopal appointment.

== Episcopal ministry ==
On 24 March 1924 he was appointed Bishop of Clonfert. After his Episcopal ordination in June 1924 he gave an interview in which he declared himself a 'Republican' and that he hoped to see a 'reversion to the pre-Treaty days of Ireland'. He was the first Irish bishop to speak against the Treaty and articulate a pro-Sinn Fein perspective. Thomas Gilmartin, Archbishop of Tuam is said to have remarked, "…after that I am finished consecrating bishops." Gilmartin had counseled his priests that whatever their personal political beliefs, they should not take an aggressive part on behalf of either side.

In 1933 Dignan published a pamphlet, Catholics and Trinity College. He also had to contend with the radically right-wing priest John Fahy, who he would censor after his 1929 imprisonment.

Dignan was appointed chair of the Committee of Management of the National Health Insurance Society in 1936 by Seán T. O'Kelly and would feature prominently in the development of government policy in this area for much of the next decade. It has been suggested that he "campaigned relentlessly" for the introduction of state medical benefits including in personal meetings with Éamon de Valera and finally saw this being legislated for in 1942.

In 1944 he published Social Security: outlines of a scheme of national health insurance hailed at the time as Ireland's Beveridge plan and which ignited a debate about wider social welfare provision in the recently independent Ireland. It took discussion of social policy in twentieth century Ireland out of nineteenth century ideological notions such as 'poor law provision.'

In 1943, the Franciscan Missionaries of the Divine Motherhood opened a nursing home in Ballinasloe. Dignan invited them to open a hospital. The bishop donated the land, and Portiuncula Hospital opened in 1945.
