= Ardscoil Mhuire =

Coordinates: 53.3224°N 8.2468°W

- Mackney, Ballinasloe, County Galway; Ireland

Information
- Religious affiliation: Roman Catholic
- Established: 1919
- Founders: Sisters of Mercy
- Closed: 1 September 2025
- Principal: Pauric Hanlon
- Chaplain: V. Rev. John Garvey
- Enrollment: 483 (2025)
- Publication: Echoes
- Website: www.ardscoilmhuire.com

Ardscoil Mhuire was an Irish voluntary Catholic single-sex girls' secondary school situated in Mackney, near Ballinasloe in County Galway. It was under the trusteeship of Catholic Education an Irish Schools Trust (CEIST). It amalgamated with Garbally College in September 2025 to become Clonfert College.

== History ==
Ardscoil Mhuire was founded by the Sisters of Mercy in Ballinasloe in 1919. In January 2003, the school moved to the current location in Mackney, near Ballinasloe, County Galway.

On 9 March 2019, a Heritage Day was held to coincide with the school's 100th anniversary, with celebrations begun on 5 February 2019.

As of 2020, the principal of Ardscoil Mhuire was Pauric Hanlon.

A consultation process began in early 2023 for Ardscoil Mhuire and Garbally College regarding the future of Catholic secondary school provision within Ballinasloe, conducted by their patrons the Catholic Education an Irish Schools Trust (CEIST) and the Diocese of Clonfert. In October 2023, it was announced that the two schools would be amalgamated to form a new co-educational school which would open in September 2025 named Clonfert College, with principal Pauric Hanlon, former principal of Ardscoil Mhuire.

== Curriculum ==
The school offered both the Junior and Leaving Certificate cycles and a Transition Year cycle. Ardscoil Mhuire offered all the mandatory subjects, along with music and arts, speech and drama, home economics, debating, public speaking and an ICT programme.

== Alumni ==
- Aisling Dolan (b. 1975) – Fine Gael politician
- Aoibheann Reilly (b. 2000) – rugby union player
- Beibhinn Parsons (b. 2001) – rugby union player
