= Ballinasloe Town Hall Theatre =

- Interactive map of the Ballinasloe Town Hall Theatre area

General information
- Location: Society Street, Ballinasloe, County Galway, Ireland
- Coordinates: 53.3307°N 8.2249°W
- Construction started: 1842
- Opened: 1845
- Renovated: 1987

Design and construction
- Architect: Lord Clancarty

Other information
- Seating capacity: 400

Website
- ballinasloetownhall.com

Ballinasloe Town Hall Theatre (Irish: Amharclann Halla an Bhaile Béal Átha na Sluaighe) is a theatre located in Society Street, Ballinasloe, County Galway, Ireland. Originally built in 1842 as an agricultural hall, it has a 400-seat auditorium. Ballinasloe Town Hall Theatre is operated by the local community of Ballinasloe and is run by a voluntary committee.

== History ==
Ballinasloe Town Hall Theatre was opened as an agricultural hall to be used by the Farmers' Society in 1842. It was built by Lord Clancarty of the Garbally estate, and was home to the Ballinasloe Union Agricultural Society. It was later developed into a cinema and again refurbished in 1987 into a theatre, following an appeal by the owners. A fundraising event took place and with a grant from the state and the Ballinasloe Town Council, it was renovated and reopened as a theatre by President Patrick Hillery in April 1988.

== Current usage ==
As of 2020, the hall is regarded as a theatre, specialising in annual musical productions. The theatre hosts local groups including Ballinasloe Panto's week long Christmas Panto, Ballinasloe Musical Society's week long musical in March every year, first established in 1923, as well as local drama groups, theatre schools and conference groups.

A country market formerly took place in the main foyer of the Town Hall Theatre every Friday, selling local produce including baked goods, jams, fresh eggs, jewellery, knitwear, greeting cards and various crafts.
