= Dinny Delaney =

Denis Delaney
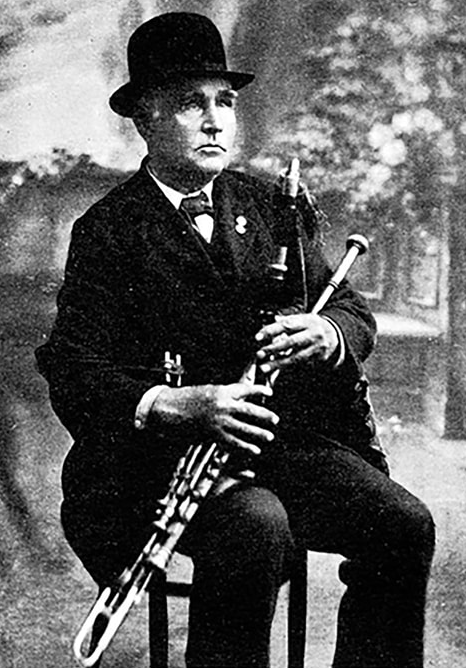
- Delaney in 1913
- Born: 6 August 1841; Tulrush, County Roscommon, Ireland
- Died: 28 November 1919 (aged 78); Ballinasloe, County Galway, Ireland
- Occupation: Uilleann Piper

Denis "Dinny" Delaney (6 August 1841 – 28 November 1919) was a well-known blind Irish piper who lived most of his life in Ballinasloe. The Dinny Delaney Festival is celebrated annually in Ballinasloe in his honour.

Delaney was born in Tulrush, in the County Roscommon part of Ballinasloe parish, but lived most of his life in Ballinasloe.

== Biography ==
His parents died not long after he was born, leaving him and his sister orphaned. He caught smallpox at the age of 13, leaving him permanently blinded. He was taught to play uilleann pipes when he was a teenager by a travelling musician named Mickey Willis.

In 1897, he joined uilleann piping competitions, earning multiple prizes and becoming more well known. It was also around this time that his playing of songs on his pipes were recorded, many of these are still preserved and can be listened to today.

In 1916 He was arrested after playing Repeal of the Union outside Mountbellew police station in the wake of the Easter Rising. Dinny's pipes were thrashed as he was arrested, leading to a nation-wide subscription to help pay to get the famous instrument repaired. The community endeavour quickly raised more than five times the sum necessary for the work and materials required and so the balance, after the pipe-maker was paid, was promptly awarded to Dinny himself as a mark of the respect and esteem with which he was held within the nation.

He was described by O'Neill as "One of the few surviving, good, old-time players of the rollicking style ... Robust in build and ruddy of complexion, he is one of the central figures in its life, and in its celebrated fair." O'Neill went on to say:

"Though totally blind, he is, strange to say, unsurpassed as a judge of cattle and other kinds of farm stock, and so well recognized is his skill in this respect that at fair and market his opinion is eagerly sought when trading is in progress. Stranger still is the fact that furniture moving is his principal occupation. With a table on his head, or a cupboard on his back, he can make his way safely all over town. To see him thus engaged and without a trace of timidity in his footsteps, a stranger would never suspect that he was blind."

"Gifted with great conversational powers, an endless fund of humor, and a tenacious memory, he is naturally the life of every gathering which he attends. With such attractions, not to mention his qualifications as a prize-winning piper, we can understand how he won the heart and hand of a buxom young colleen half his age, it being his second matrimonial venture."

"The jolly Denis, having "seen" to the burial of an old friend and brother piper, naturally "came in" for his beautiful set of pipes. He disposed of his own superannuated set, made by the elder Kenna in 1781, to Mr. Wayland, the irrepressible enthusiast and untiring promoter, of Cork, he being the fifth proud possessor of this specimen of Kenna's handiwork."

"The first owner after coming from the hands of the maker was a Mr. Burke of Tyquin, near Athenry, County Galway, and their cost ten pounds. By bequest they became the property of Mr. Burke's nephew, Mr. C. Natton, of Kingstown. Dublin, from whom Denis Delaney purchased them in 1873."

Delaney died of pneumonia on 29 November 1919 in the infirmary of Ballinasloe Workhouse. According to his death certificate, he was 78. He was married twice: in 1869 to Catherine Coleman and in 1904 to Maria Flannery.

== Legacy ==
The Dinny Delaney Festival is an annual three day long traditional music festival, celebrating the traditions of uilleann pipes, in commemoration of Delaney, it is held in his native Ballinasloe. The festival includes concerts, masterclasses, sessions and livestreams.

== See also ==
- Uilleann Pipes
- Ballinasloe
