= John Kirby (bishop) =

Irish bishop

The Most Reverend John Kirby
- Roman Catholic Diocese of Clonfert
- Church: Catholic Church
- Archdiocese: Roman Catholic Archdiocese of Tuam
- In office: 1988 - 2019
- Predecessor: Joseph Cassidy (bishop)
- Successor: Michael Duignan (bishop)
- Previous post: President Garbally College

Orders
- Ordination: 23 June 1963
- Consecration: 9 April 1988 by Gaetano Alibrandi

Personal details
- Born: 29 October 1938 Athlone

Styles of John Kirby
- Reference style: The Most Reverend
- Spoken style: Your Lordship or Bishop
- Religious style: Bishop
- Posthumous style: not applicable

John Kirby (born 29 October 1938) is a prelate of the Catholic Church who was the Bishop of Clonfert from 1988 to 2019.

He was born in Baylough, Athlone, County Roscommon, Ireland. He was educated at Garbally College, and then went to St. Patrick's College, Maynooth. He earned a BSs there in 1959 in mathematical physics and experimental physics, and then studied for the priesthood. He was ordained on 23 June 1963 for his home diocese.

He returned to Garbally College to teach, and also coached the rugby team there, being the first to notice the skills of Ciaran Fitzgerald, who would go on to captain the national team. Dr Kirby was later appointed to the Presidency of the college.

On 18 February 1988 he was appointed Bishop. He was ordained a bishop on 9 April. The Principal Consecrator was Archbishop Gaetano Alibrandi, the Apostolic Nuncio to Ireland; his Principal Co-Consecrators were two of his predecessors Archbishop Joseph Cassidy, and Bishop William Philbin.

The role of Bishop of Clonfert "ex-officio" includes the roles of Parish Priest of Ballinasloe and senior governor of Garbally College.

Pope Francis accepted his resignation on 16 July 2019.
