= Roman Catholic Diocese of Clonfert =

Catholic diocese in Ireland

Coordinates: 53.2004°N 8.5701°W

Diocese of Clonfert Dioecesis Clonfertensis Deoise Chluain Fearta

Catholic
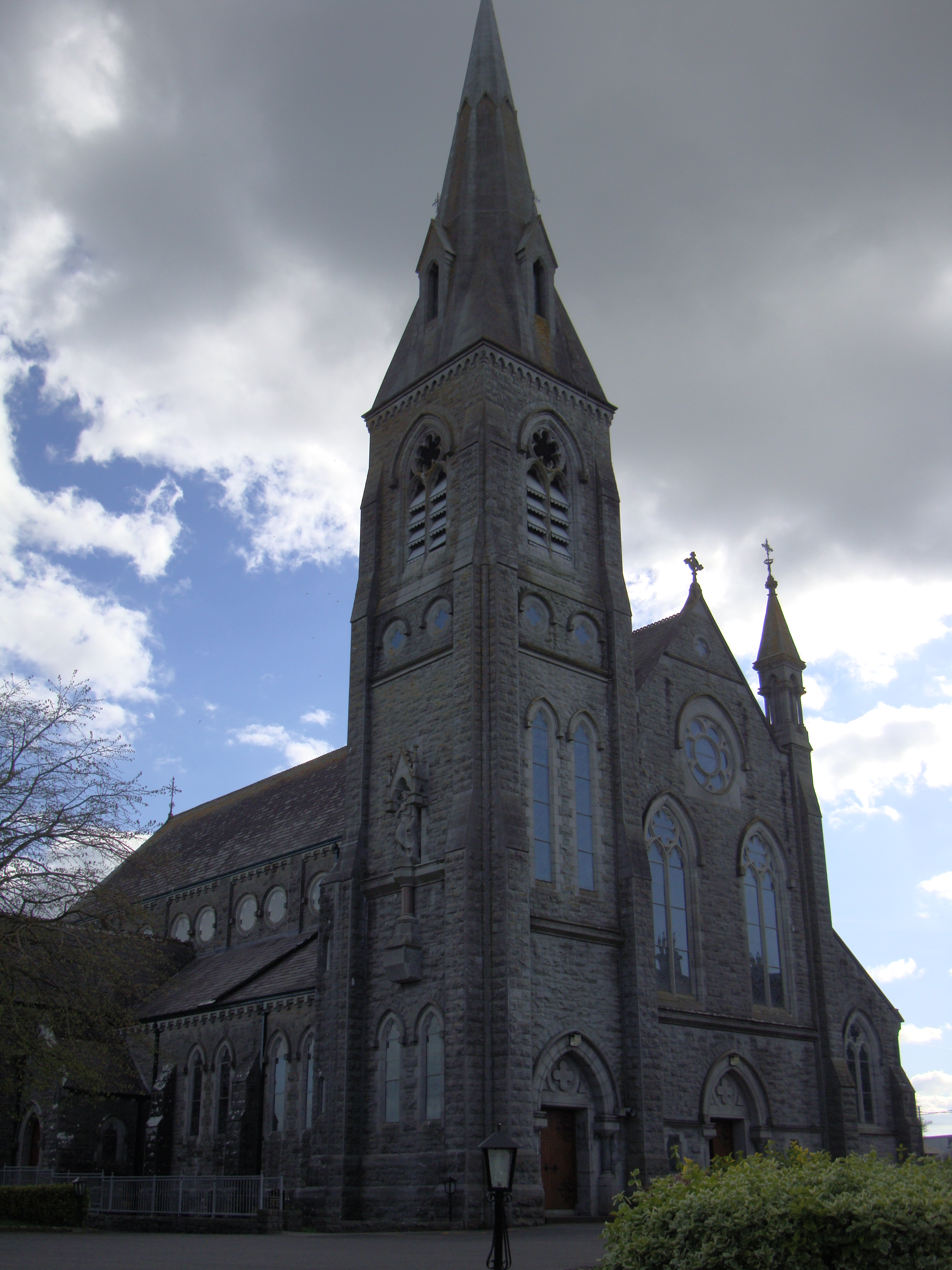
- Loughrea Cathedral

Location
- Country: Ireland
- Territory: Parts of counties Galway, Offaly and Roscommon
- Ecclesiastical province: Province of Tuam
- Metropolitan: Archdiocese of Tuam

Statistics
- Area: 960 sq mi (2,500 km^{2})
- Population: 36,000

Information
- Denomination: Catholic Church
- Sui iuris church: Latin Church
- Rite: Roman rite
- Established: Bishopric in 550; Diocese in 1111
- Cathedral: St. Brendan’s Cathedral, Loughrea
- Patron saint: St Brendan

Current leadership
- Pope: Leo XIV
- Bishop: Michael Duignan, Bishop of Clonfert
- Metropolitan Archbishop: Francis Duffy, Archbishop of Tuam
- Bishops emeritus: John Kirby

Map
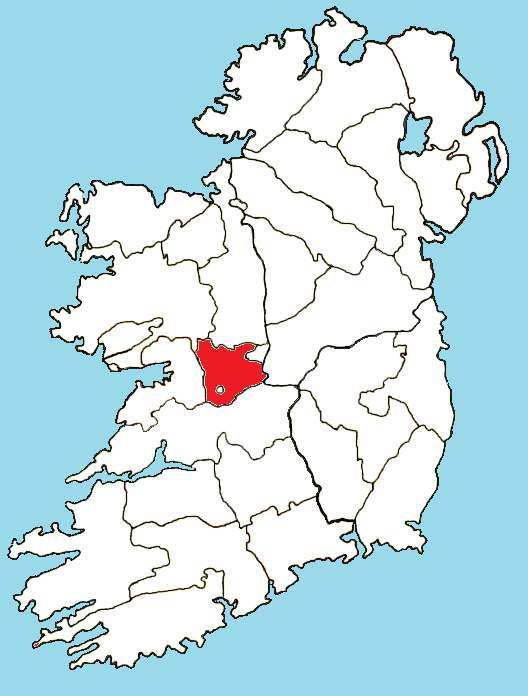

Website
- clonfertdiocese.ie

The Diocese of Clonfert (Irish: Deoise Chluain Fearta) is a Latin Church diocese of the Catholic Church in the western part of Ireland. It is in the Metropolitan Province of Tuam.

Michael Duignan was appointed by the Holy See on 16 July 2019 and ordained bishop on 13 October 2019. It is Ireland's smallest diocese by population and territory with a declining number of clergy and, in recognition of this, in Feb 2022 the Vatican united the diocese in persona episcopi with Michael Duignan serving simultaneously as Bishop of Clonfert and of Roman Catholic Diocese of Galway, Kilmacduagh and Kilfenora.

== Territory ==
The diocese covers almost the whole of East Galway, with one parish (Lusmagh) in County Offaly while the parishes of Taughmaconnell, Creagh and the half-parish of Ballinasloe lie in County Roscommon. This was the ancient territory of the kingdom of Uí Maine (Hy-Many), as it existed when the diocese was formed. In fact, the bishop of the diocese was sometimes referred to as the Bishop of Hy-Many. The major towns in the diocese are Ballinasloe, Loughrea and Portumna.

The cathedra is currently located at Loughrea but was historically Clonfert Cathedral.

== History ==
=== Early history ===
Established in A.D. 550 as an abbacy, it was promoted to a diocese in 1111. The early Irish monastery and school of Clonfert, founded by Saint Brendan, was the dominant ecclesiastical centre in the area and an important centre of learning in the early Irish church. Cummian, an important theological writer was from there. It was also deeply involved in the eighth century spiritual reform movement of the Céli Dé.

Saint Brendan's fame as a seafaring missionary contributed to its pre-eminence in later times and led to its choice as an episcopal see in the twelfth century. Like most dioceses in Ireland, the present Diocese of Clonfert had its origin in the Synod of Rathbreasail in 1110, reaching its final form at the Synod of Kells in 1152 when it was made a suffragan of the Archdiocese of Tuam.

=== Feudal period ===
In 1170, the Annals of Clonmacnois record that "there was a great convocation of the clergy of Ireland at Clonfert by commission from the Pope for the reformation of certain abuses of a long time used in Ireland", which was presided over by Saint Laurence O'Toole as papal legate.

In the early 13th century its bishop was one of those appointed by Honorius III to investigate a dispute over the election of the Bishop of Ardfert. Later that century it was provided with John, a bishop of Italian birth — one of the very few occasions when this happened in Ireland.

In the 14th and 15th centuries, bishops introduced the mendicant orders: the Franciscans to Kilconnell, Kinalehin and Meelick, with their 3rd Order to Clonkeenkerril and Kilbocht; the Dominicans to Portumna, with their 3rd Order to Kilcorban; and the Carmelites to Loughrea.

=== Catholic Emancipation ===
In 1704, the diocese had forty-one parishes but by 1800, these were amalgamated into twenty four. There followed a period of church building. Churches were erected in Ballymacward and Ballinasloe, the latter designed by McCarthy and Pugin. Landlord intransigence prevented the building of a cathedral in Loughrea until 1897 when Bishop Healy laid the foundation stone. The era of the Celtic Revival and Irish Stained Glass had begun, and influenced its interior decoration. The Sisters of Mercy were brought to Loughrea in 1850 by Bishop Derry and spread to five towns in the diocese, operating primary and secondary schools, industrial schools at Loughrea and Ballinasloe and a domestic economy school at Portumna. They also staffed the workhouse hospitals in Loughrea, Ballinasloe and Portumna and latterly the county home in Loughrea. The Sisters of Mount Carmel, who have been in Loughrea since the 17th century, conducted a school there up to 1860 but have since been an enclosed order. In 1945 Bishop Dignan introduced the Franciscan Missionaries of the Divine Motherhood to Ballinasloe, where they built Portiuncula Hospital, which has been enlarged many times since and is now a general hospital under the Western Health Board.

The diocesan seminary, begun at Loughrea by Bishop Derry in the 19th century, was succeeded by St. Joseph's College at Cartron, at Esker and finally at Garbally College since 1924.

== Ordinaries ==
The following is a basic list of the post-Reformation Roman Catholic bishops.

- Thady Farrell, O.P. (1587–1602)
- (Dermot Nolan, appointed vicar ap. 1609)
- (Thady Egan, appointed vicar ap. 1622)
- John de Burgo (1629–1647)
- Walter Lynch (1647–1663)
- Sede vacante (1663–1678)
- Thady Keogh, O.P. (1678–1687)
- (See vacant, 1687–1695)
- Maurice Donnellan (1695–1706)
- Sede vacante (1706–1711)
- Ambrose O'Madden (1711–1715)
- Edmund Kelly (1718–1733)
- Peter O'Donnellan (1733–1778)
- Andrew O'Donellan (1778–1786)
- Thomas Costello (1786–1831)
- Thomas Coen (1831–1847)
- John Derry (1847–1870)
- (Hugh O'Rorke, 1871)
- Patrick Duggan (1871–1896)
- John Healy (1896–1903)
- Thomas O'Dea (1903–1909)
- Thomas P. Gilmartin (1909–1918)
- Thomas O'Doherty (1919–1923)
- John Dignan (1924–1953)
- William J. Philbin (1953–1962)
- Thomas Ryan (1963–1982)
- Joseph Cassidy (1982–1987)
- John Kirby (1988–2019)
- Michael Duignan (2019–present)

== See also ==
- Catholic Church in Ireland
