= Denis Madden =

Irish police officer (born 1948)

- Born: 1948 (age 77–78); Ballinasloe, County Galway, Ireland
- Known for: Recipient of the Scott Medal for bravery
- Police career
- Country: Garda Síochána
- Allegiance: Republic of Ireland
- Status: Retired
- Rank: Garda
- Badge no.: 17523D
- Awards: Scott Medal

Denis Madden (born 1948), Garda Síochána 17523D, is an Irish recipient of the Scott Medal.

== Background ==
A native of Ballinasloe, Madden was awarded the Scott Medal for his actions during an incident on 21 December 1994.

== Incident in Galway ==
On mobile patrol during a night of poor visibility and freezing fog, Madden was informed that a man had fallen into the canal on Lower Dominic Street, Galway.

"When he reached the scene ... the man scal[ed] the railings and [threw] himself into the water. Other Gardaí at the scene threw him a lifebuoy but the man would not take it. Removing his jacket and shoes, Garda madden jumped the twenty feet from the canal wall to the water. The man seemed determined to frustrate all efforts to save him and dragged Madden under the surface with him at least once. In an endeavour which of necessity combined rescue and capture, Madden swam to the canal wall against the man's resistance and there managed to secure him with a rope thrown down by his colleagues. The rope, however, became entangled causing the man to break loose. Again he was swept away and again Madden renewed the struggle both above and below the surface ... some ten minutes later, Madden's colleagues succeeded in pulling their reluctant rescuee clear of the water. For a brief period Madden himself was in danger of been [sic] swept away."

The rescued man made a full recovery. Madden was awarded the Scott Bronze Medal on 15 February 1996. He retired in 2000.
