= St. Michael's Church, Ballinasloe =

St Michael's Church, Ballinasloe
- Eaglais Naomh Mícheál
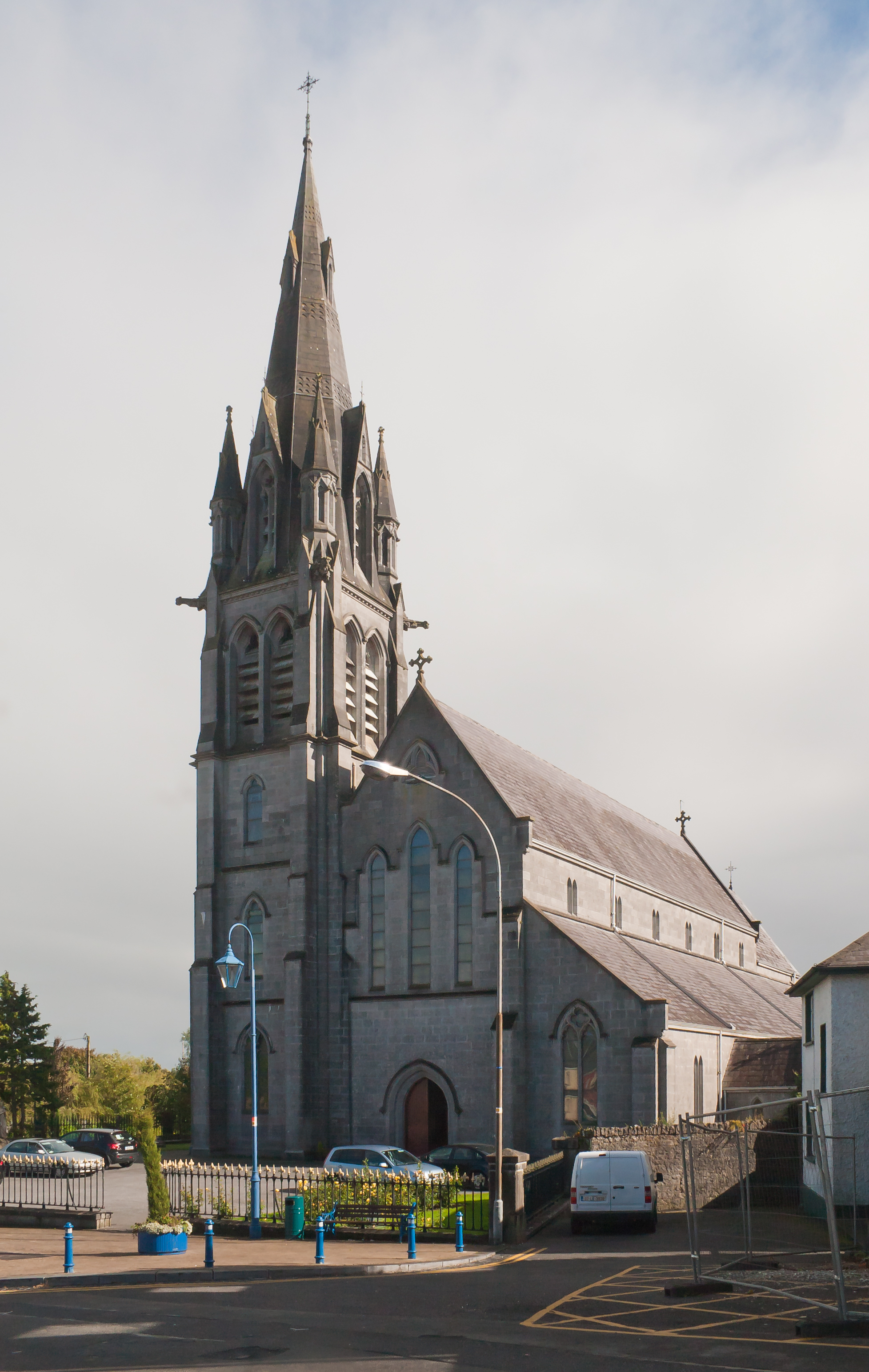
- St Michael's Church, Ballinasloe
- Location: St Michael's Square, Ballinasloe, County Galway
- Country: Ireland
- Website: https://www.clonfertdiocese.ie/parish/ballinasloe/

History
- Dedication: St. Michael
- Consecrated: 25 August 1858

Architecture
- Architect: J.J. McCarthy
- Style: Roman Catholic
- Completed: 1858

St. Michael's Church (Irish: Eaglais Naomh Mícheál) is a large-scale Roman Catholic church built of limestone located on the south end of Saint Michael's Square, Ballinasloe, County Galway, Ireland. It was designed by J.J. McCarthy in 1846 and was built in 1858.

== History ==
St. Michael's Church was to be designed after a competition by J.J. McCarthy in 1846. The project was abandoned due to the Famine. A revised designed by Augustus Welby Northmore Pugin was started in 1842. The church was consecrated on 25 August 1858 by Cardinal Wiseman of Westminster.

== Building and interior ==
St. Michael's Church is a freestanding gable-fronted Roman Catholic church built of limestone with pitched slate roofs with cut-stone eaves courses. The spire has octagonal-plan corner pinnacles with gargoyles diagonally to corners. It has triple lancet window openings to the upper part of the gable-front with continuous hood-moulding and stained-glass windows. The front elevation of the side-aisle of the ground floor of the tower has cinquefoil-headed double-light window openings with under carved hood-mouldings. The opening to the chancel has a pointed arch four-light traceried window with a stained glass. The church interior has a tiled porch and a pointed chancel arch with an organ gallery to the north end of the church. There are many stained-glass windows in the church, including a two-light window by Harry Clarke of St. Patrick and the Rose of Lima. There are murals in the church by Joshua Clarke and a mural of Saint Grellan by Joseph Tierney. St. Michael's Church is the tallest building in Ballinasloe and the church is visible over much of Ballinasloe.

== Gallery ==
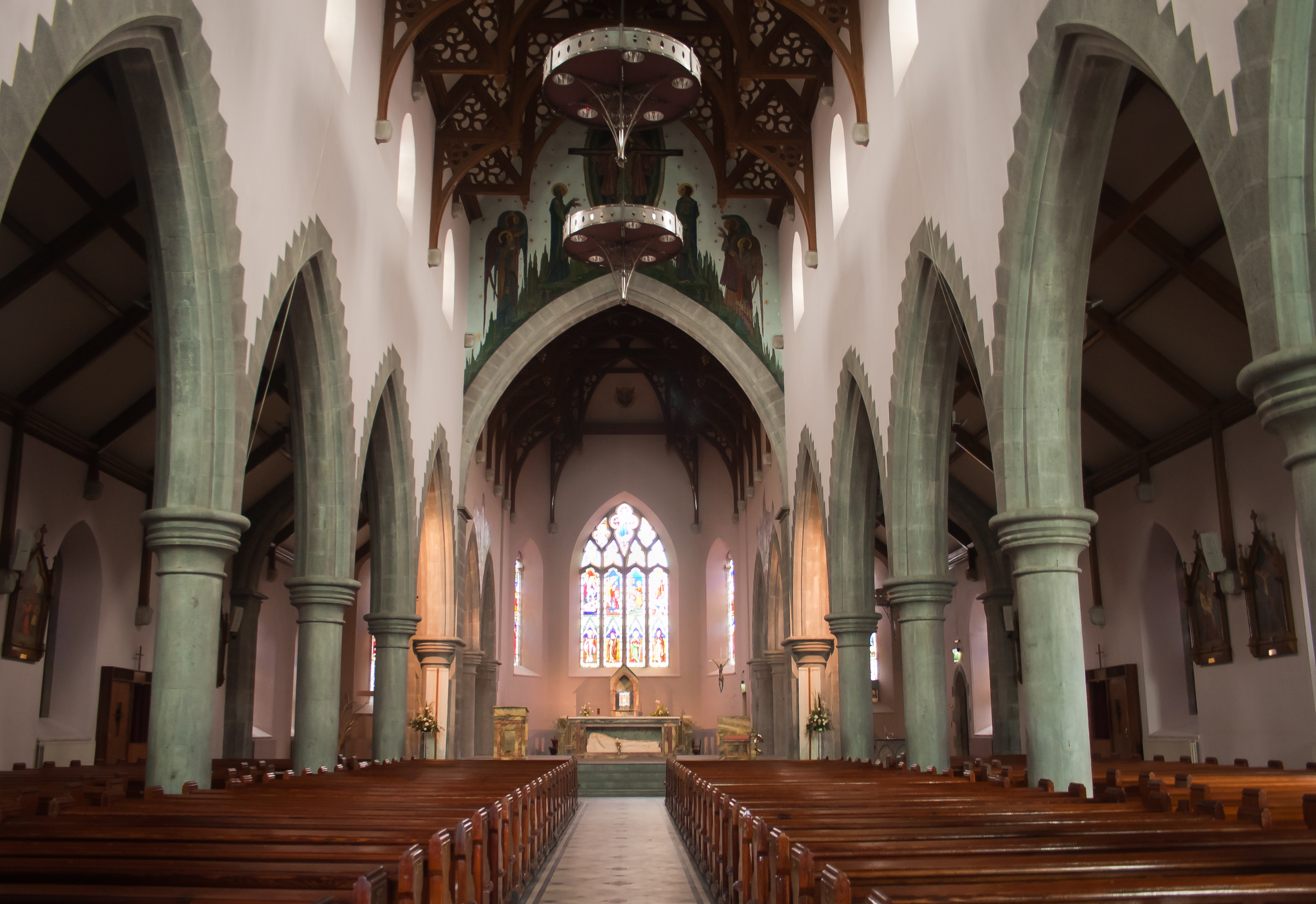
Church interior and nave

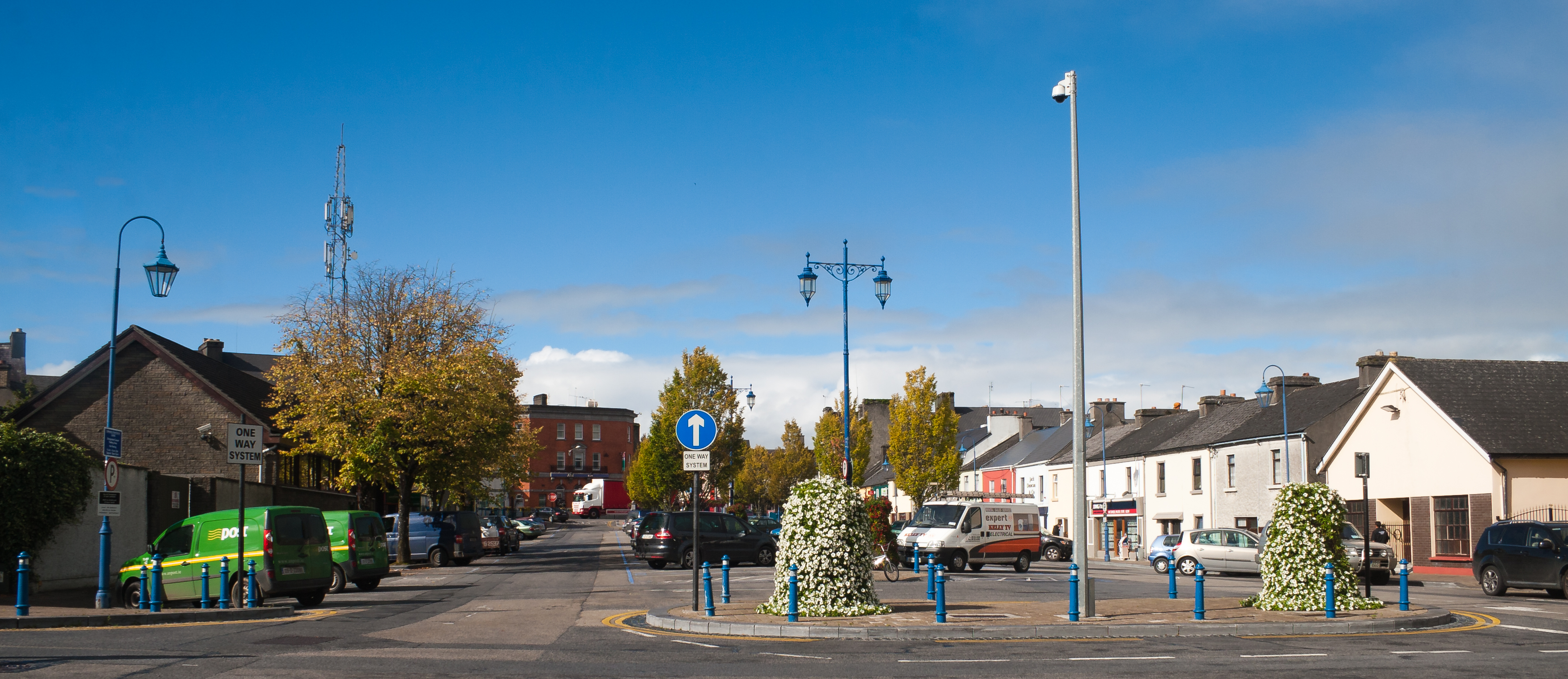
North-west view of Saint Michael's Square

== See also ==
- St. John's Church, Ballinasloe
