= Portiuncula University Hospital =

Public hospital in County Galway, Ireland

- Health Service Executive
- Shown in Ireland

Geography
- Location: Ballinasloe, County Galway, Ireland
- Coordinates: 53.3269°N 8.2373°W

Organisation
- Type: General

Services
- Emergency department: Yes
- Beds: 220

History
- Founded: 1943

Links
- Website: www.saolta.ie/hospital/puh

Portiuncula University Hospital (Irish: Ospidéal Ollscoile Phortiuncula) is a public hospital in Ballinasloe, County Galway, Ireland. It is managed by Saolta University Health Care Group.

The hospital is on Brackernagh, a principal road in Ballinasloe, forming part of the R446 road. Counties in the hospital's catchment area are east Galway, Westmeath, north Tipperary, Roscommon and Offaly.

== History ==
The Franciscan Missionaries of the Divine Motherhood opened a nursing home at "Mount Pleasant" in 1943, and John Dignan, the bishop of the Roman Catholic Diocese of Clonfert, invited them to found a hospital, which opened on 9 April 1945. The nuns named their hospital after Portiuncula in Italy, the place where Franciscanism began.

The hospital changed its name from Portiuncula General Hospital to Portiuncula University Hospital in November 2015.

== Services ==
The hospital provides 195 in-patient beds and 25 day case beds.

== Performance ==
In July 2014 a number of serious hygiene issues were raised during an unscheduled inspection of the hospital by Health Information and Quality Authority (HIQA). These issues concerned the management of blood monitoring equipment at the hospital, and inspectors found blood-stained sticky tape on a window sill beside a patient's bed, as well as failure to dispose of used blood sampling equipment. Inspectors also found the fixtures of the hospital to be in a state of disrepair. The report recommended a "more robust system of managing and maintaining such equipment is put in place to mitigate the risks to patients and staff of acquiring a healthcare association infection".

In January 2015, the HSE's Saolta Group launched an independent probe into maternity services at the hospital after a review of the care of seven infants who were born over a ten-month period in 2014 found that two of them died and five had evidence of oxygen deprivation during childbirth. In May 2018, the report identified multiple serious failures, including staffing issues, a lack of training and poor communication among maternity staff, which contributed to the death of three babies. Of the 18 births examined, six involved stillbirths or the death of the baby shortly after delivery. A further six cases involved injury, including one of Grade 3 Hypoxic Ischaemic Encephalopathy.

In January 2025, the HSE ordered external reviews into the delivery of nine babies at the hospital, including two who were stillborn in 2023. Six babies were delivered with HIE in 2024 and one baby with HIE in 2025. In July 2025, the HSE announced that between 200 and 300 expectant mothers with "high-risk" pregnancies would be moved from the hospital to other locations. This caused public outrage and a protest attended by around 2,000 people was held in August to voice their concern about what they say was the downgrading of maternity services at the hospital.
