= St. Brigid's Hospital =

- Health Service Executive
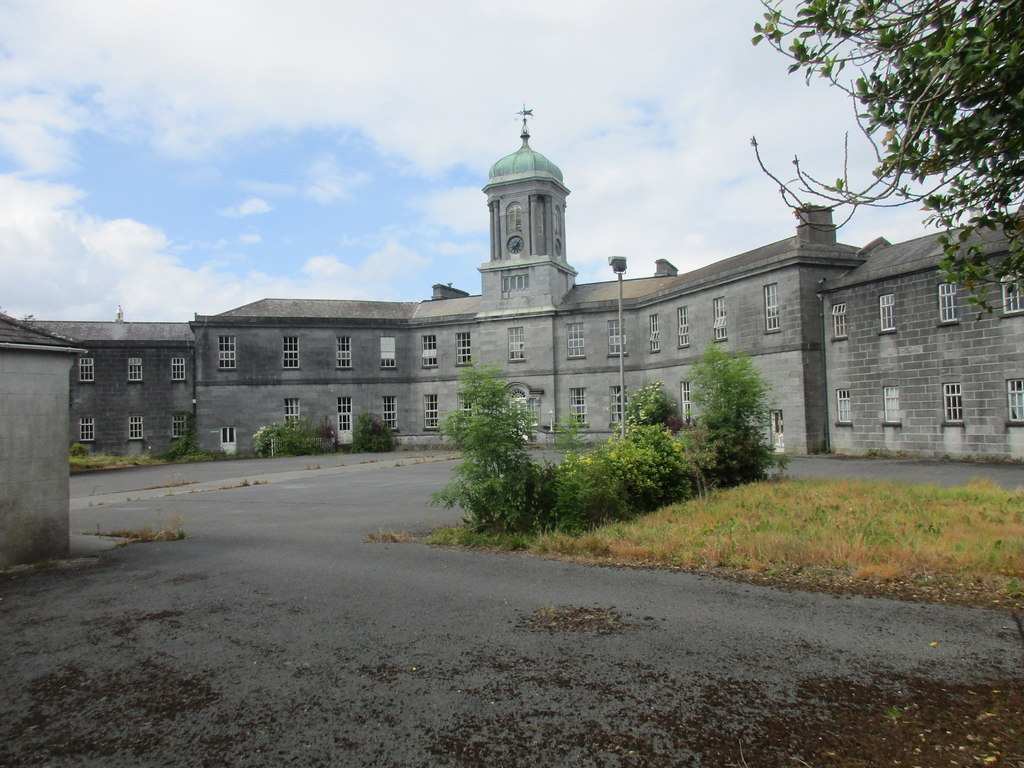
- St. Brigid's Hospital

- Shown in Ireland

Geography
- Location: Ballinasloe, County Galway, Ireland
- Coordinates: 53.3293°N 8.2085°W

Organisation
- Care system: HSE
- Type: Specialist

Services
- Emergency department: No
- Speciality: Psychiatric Hospital

History
- Founded: 1833
- Closed: 2013

St. Brigid's Hospital (Irish: Ospidéal Naomh Bríd) was a psychiatric hospital in Ballinasloe, County Galway, Ireland.

== History ==
The hospital, which was designed by William Murray, opened as the Connacht District Lunatic Asylum in 1833. After a redrawing of the asylum district boundaries in 1850, it was renamed the Ballinasloe District Asylum. New wings were completed in 1871 and 1882. As it expanded conditions became very overcrowded with nearly 1,200 patients by the early 1900s and, having been renamed Ballinasloe Mental Hospital in the late 1920s, it accommodated some 2,000 patients by the 1950s.

The facility became St. Brigid's Hospital in the 1950s. After the introduction of deinstitutionalisation in the late 1980s the hospital went into a period of decline and closed in 2013.
