= Tulrush =

Townland in County Roscommon, Ireland

Coordinates: 53.312°N 8.19°W

Tulrush is a small townland on the River Suck near Ballinasloe, Ireland. It is approximately 0.84 square kilometres (0.32 sq mi) in area and located in the historical barony of Moycarn in County Roscommon. As of the 2011 census, Tulrush townland had a population of 16 people.

As it is on the eastern bank of the River Suck, Tulrush is a part of County Roscommon. It is a part of civil parish of Creagh, which spans into County Galway. Tulrush was listed alongside Galway townlands in Griffith's valuation of 1868.

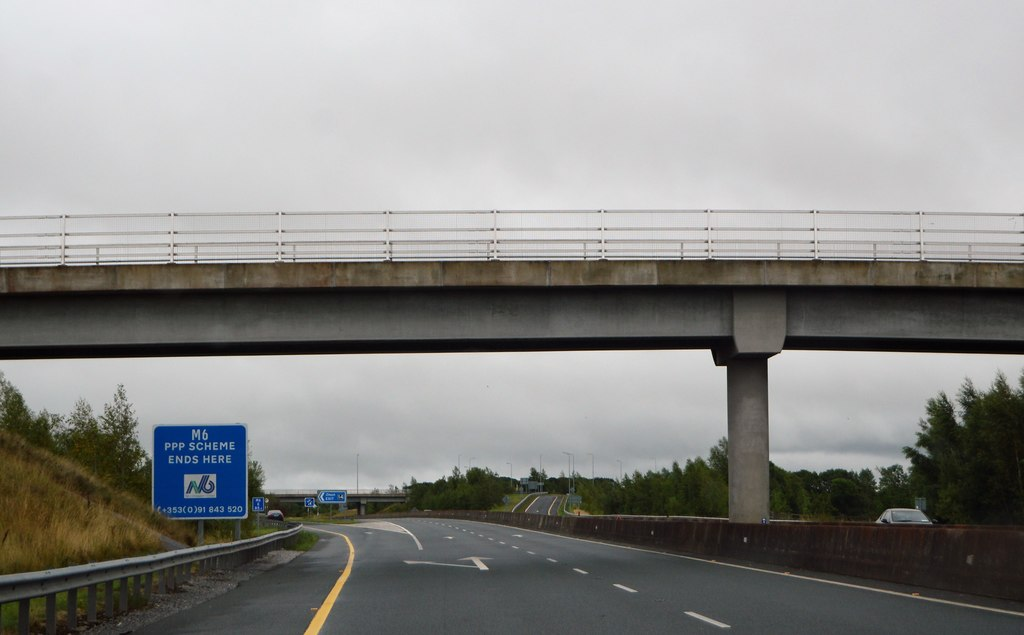
The M6 motorway passing through Tulrush

Tulrush is bounded on one side by the River Suck, main tributary to the River Shannon which it joins approx 6 miles (9.7 km) further on at Shannonbridge. Two River Suck fords (one at Pollboy and the other named "Riley's") were local crossing points. These fords were used in 1691 during the Williamite War in Ireland by the army of the Jacobite general Marquis de St Ruth, moving from the Siege of Athlone to take part in the Battle of Aughrim, where he was defeated by the Williamite general Godert de Ginkell.

In the 18th and 19th centuries, the River Suck ford between Tulrush and Pollboy was crossable for carts via a wooden bridge and widely used to access the mill on the Pollboy side. This mill was demolished in the 1990s to facilitate the new N6 motorway and riverboat passage.

A village/community of houses existed in the 19th century on the edge of Tulrush Bog and near Tulrush Hill. The last residents left there in the 1950s. Ownership and control of the majority of the land in Tulrush rested with a landlord, the remnants of whose house are still visible overlooking the River Suck and facing towards Ballinasloe. Hamilton Barrett, the last landlord, died in the early 1940s, and his lands (approx 250 acres (1.0 km^{2}) of grazing, arable, callow) were taken over by the Land Commission and divided between four local families.

The M6 motorway passes through Tulrush with an entry ramp, near this point.
