= St. John's Church, Ballinasloe =

Saint John the Evangelist Church of Ireland
- Eaglais Naomh Eoin an Soiscéalaí na hÉireann
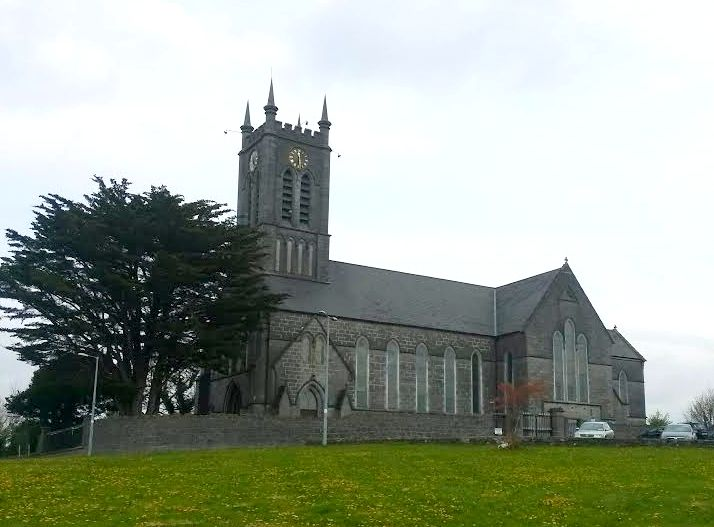
- Location: Church Hill, Ballinasloe, County Galway
- Country: Ireland

History
- Dedication: St. John
- Consecrated: 22 October 1845

Architecture
- Architect: Joseph Welland
- Completed: 1842
- Demolished: 1899 (rebuilt)

Saint John the Evangelist Church of Ireland (Irish: Eaglais Naomh Eoin an Soiscéalaí na hÉireann) is an Anglican (Church of Ireland), freestanding cruciform-plan church built of limestone located on Church Hill, Ballinasloe, County Galway, Ireland. It was designed by Joseph Welland and was built in 1842. It was rebuilt following fire in 1899.

== History ==
St. John's Church was designed by Joseph Welland and was built in 1842. The building was gutted in a major fire in 1899. It was said that the clock continued to chime until its works melted in the heat. An exquisite stone pulpit carved by James Beegan, a local sculptor, was badly damaged. The church was consecrated on 22 October 1845.

== Building and interior ==
St. John's Church is a freestanding cruciform-plan Anglican church built of limestone with pitched slate roofs, cut limestone copings and cross finials. The building features limestone walls with cut-stone string courses and lancet window openings. It has a crenellated parapet to the tower with carved pinnacles set on the buttresses, and with clock faces to the top stage. The lancet openings to the tower has cut-stone louvres from the lower stage to the upper stage. The outer building has a cast-iron double-leaf gate with chambered square-profile piers, and square-headed pedestrian openings with cast-iron pedestrian gates. Located in a dominant position, this church remains an impressive landmark in Ballinasloe.

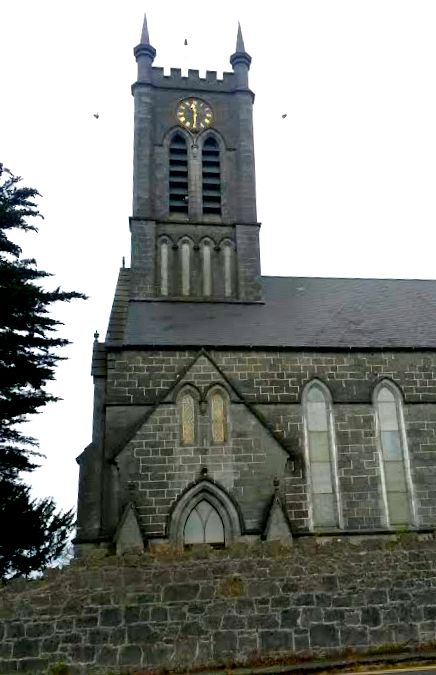
St. John's Church, Ballinasloe

== See also ==
- St Michael's Church, Ballinasloe
