= P. J. Dwyer =

Irish rugby union player

- Full name: Patrick Joseph Dwyer
- Born: 24 May 1940 (age 86) Clonlee, County Galway, Ireland

Rugby union career
- Position: Prop
International career
| Years | Team | Apps | (Points) |
| 1962–64 | Ireland | 5 | (0) |

Patrick Joseph Dwyer (born 24 May 1940) is an Irish former international rugby union player.

Born in Clonlee, County Galway, Dwyer was educated at Garbally College and University College Dublin.

Dwyer played for University College Dublin RFC and was capped five times for Ireland, debuting against Wales in 1962. He appeared in Ireland's match against the 1963–64 All Blacks, as one of four Connacht players in the pack.

After retiring, Dwyer served Connacht Rugby as an administrator and coach. He was an Ireland chairman of selectors during the 1980s, becoming the first Connacht representative to be a senior national selector.

== See also ==
- List of Ireland national rugby union players
