= Garbally College =

St. Joseph's College, Garbally Park

Location
- Garbally Park, Ballinasloe, County Galway; Ireland
- Coordinates: 53.3234°N 8.2481°W

Information
- Other name: Garbally College
- Motto: Latin: Fide et Fortitudine (Faith and Courage)
- Religious affiliation: Roman Catholic
- Patron saint: St. Joseph
- Established: 1892
- Founders: John Healy and James Madden
- Closed: 1 September 2025
- President: Colm Allman
- Principal: Paul Walsh
- Patron: Michael Duignan
- Chaplain: Iomar Daniels
- Enrollment: 465 (2024)
- Colours: Blue and white
- Publication: The Fountain
- Website: www.garballycollege.com

St. Joseph's College, Garbally Park (Irish: Coláiste Sheosaimh) was an Irish voluntary Catholic secondary school situated in Garbally Park, the former seat of the Earl of Clancarty, in Ballinasloe, County Galway. It was a single-sex boys day school which had previously served as a boarding school. It was more commonly known as Garbally College (Irish: Coláiste Ghearrbhaile). It amalgamated with Ardscoil Mhuire in September 2025 to become Clonfert College.

== History ==
St Joseph's College was founded as a Roman Catholic seminary in 1892 to help educate priests for the Roman Catholic Diocese of Clonfert. Today, it is a voluntary Catholic Secondary School under the patronage of the Catholic Bishop of Clonfert. It is managed by a Board of Management in accordance with the Articles of Management for Catholic Secondary Schools.

The college was established at Cartron with funds provided by James Madden. Due to expansion the college was changed to Esker, near Athenry in 1894. In 1901, it moved to the building known locally as "The Pines", at Creagh, Ballinasloe. In 1923, it moved to its present site at Garbally, once seat of the Earls of Clancarty. The Diocese purchased Garbally Court (built in 1819) and estate from the trustees of the Earls of Clancarty for £6,750 in 1922.

In the 1940s, 50s and 60s two other members of the same Madden family, brothers John Madden of Killimor and George Madden of London bestowed many gifts on Garbally, including the funds to build the present science halls, study hall, extra classrooms and dining hall.

Bishop John Kirby taught mathematics and coached the senior rugby team at the school in the late 1960s, and was later appointed as president and principal of the college in September 1979.

In September 2008, Garbally College's boarding facility officially ended after almost 85 years in existence.

A consultation process began in early 2023 for Garbally College and Ardscoil Mhuire regarding the future of Catholic secondary school provision within Ballinasloe, conducted by their patrons the Diocese of Clonfert and the Catholic Education an Irish Schools Trust (CEIST). In October 2023, it was announced that the two schools would be amalgamated to form a new co-educational school which will open in September 2025 named Clonfert College, with principal Pauric Hanlon, former principal of Ardscoil Mhuire. In May 2025, a group of Garbally College alumni launched a campaign to preserve the school's legacy in the amalgamated school's name, calling for the adoption of the name 'Clonfert College at Garbally Park' and for the school's sports teams to continue playing under the name 'Garbally'. A survey was conducted to assess support for the petition, with 88% of respondents backing to retain the Garbally name, including former Ireland rugby captain Ciaran Fitzgerald, ex-rugby international Noel Mannion, Connacht Rugby scrum-half Colm Reilly, a son of former Garbally College principal Stephen Reilly, Galway hurlers Iggy Clarke, Seán Silke, Conor Hayes, Michael Duignan and Damien Joyce. However, the Board of Management of Clonfert College confirmed the next month that Garbally would not be retained, stating it would "elevate" one founding school over the other.

== Curriculum ==
The school offered both the Junior and Leaving Certificate cycles and was one of the first schools to implement a Transition Year programme when it was introduced in 1973. Garbally offered all the mandatory subjects, along with woodwork, metalwork, home economics, technical graphics, business studies, design & communication and music.

== Sport ==
Garbally College was known for its sporting tradition in rugby union, hurling, Gaelic football and soccer. The college won several Connacht Schools Senior Cups and Connacht Schools Junior Cups and produced a number of Irish Rugby Internationals. Garbally won the Senior Cup 47 times, with their most recent and final win in 2020. Garbally won the Junior Cup 43 times, last claiming the title in 2019. The last team to include borders, which won the cup, was in 2007. The final team to play as St. Joseph's College, Garbally competed in 2025, before the school's amalgamation into Clonfert College.

== Notable alumni ==
Academia

- Patrick Gullane, Professor and chair, Department of Otolaryngology–Head and Neck Surgery, University of Toronto
- Philip Pettit, William Nelson Cromwell Professor of Politics at Princeton University
- Michael Tierney, president of University College Dublin

Arts and media

- Jim Fahy, RTÉ western correspondent, journalist, broadcaster and documentary maker
- Desmond Hogan, novelist
- Seán Moncrieff, media broadcaster/presenter
- Ulick O'Connor, writer, historian and critic
- Eoghan Ó Tuairisc, writer, poet, dramatist
- Tommy Tiernan, comedian, actor and writer
- Peter Claffey, actor, rugby player

Business

- Ulick McEvaddy, businessman

Politics

- Patrick Beegan, former Fianna Fáil Teachta Dála
- Seán Calleary, former Fianna Fáil Teachta Dála
- Patrick Connolly, former Attorney General of Ireland.
- Eamon Gilmore, Tánaiste, Minister for Foreign Affairs and Trade and the former Leader of the Labour Party
- Brendan Glynn, former Fine Gael Teachta Dála
- Brian Hayes, Fine Gael Teachta Dála for Dublin South-West
- Patrick Hogan, first Minister for Agriculture
- Seán Kenny, Labour Party Teachta Dála
- Tony Kett, former Fianna Fáil member of Seanad Éireann
- Gerry Reynolds, former Fine Gael Teachta Dála for Sligo–Leitrim
- Michael Tierney, former Cumann na nGaedheal TD and president of University College Dublin
- Noel Treacy, former Fianna Fáil Teachta Dála for Galway East

Religious

- Patrick Joseph Kelly, former Bishop of Benin City
- John Kirby, former Catholic Bishop of Clonfert
- Michael Griffin, Catholic priest, murdered by Crown forces in 1920
- John Fahy, priest, republican, agrarian and radical

Sports

- Michael Duignan, All-Ireland winning former Offaly hurler, RTÉ Gaelic games commentator.
- Ciaran Fitzgerald, former Irish rugby international
- Noel Mannion, former rugby player
- Ray McLoughlin, former Irish rugby international and chairman and chief executive of The Crean Group
- Johnny O'Connor, Irish rugby international
- Tiernan O'Halloran, Irish rugby international
- Willie Ruane, rugby player, CEO of Connacht Rugby
- Colm Reilly, rugby player
- John Muldoon, rugby union coach, former player
- Shane Jennings, Irish rugby international
- PJ Dwyer, Irish rugby international

== Notable staff and former staff ==
- Ulick Burke, former Fine Gael Teachta Dála for Galway East
- John Dignan, former Bishop of Clonfert, served as president of the college
- John Kirby, former Catholic Bishop of Clonfert, served as president of the college

== See also ==
- Garbally House
- Roman Catholic Diocese of Clonfert
- Roman Catholic Diocese of Galway, Kilmacduagh and Kilfenora
