= Franciscan Missionaries of the Divine Motherhood =

- Abbreviation: F.M.D.M.
- Formation: c. AD 1947; 79 years ago
- Type: Centralized Religious Institute of Consecrated Life of Pontifical Right (for Women)
- Headquarters: Ladywell Convent, Ashtead Lane, Godalming, Surrey GU7 1ST, England
- Members: 232 members (2017)
- Superior General: Sr. Jane Bertelsen, F.M.D.M.
- Website: fmdminternational.co.uk

The Franciscan Missionaries of the Divine Motherhood, founded in 1947, is an international congregation of religious sisters that serves in 11 countries, both in the developed and developing world. It serves in various schools, prisons, and hospitals.

== Background ==
In 1884 a small group of Franciscan Tertiaries began in Holly Place, London, helping in the parish. They formed a religious congregation called "The Missionary Sisters of the Third Order of St Francis for the Home Missions" in 1896. Initially there were four communities spread over three dioceses, but only two (Littlehampton and Aldershot) remained in 1911. The Aldershot group cared for over 100 orphans.

In 1917, the Aldershot community came under the leadership of Mother Colette and received permission to take postulants. Blanche Spring, later known as Mother Francis, joined the community. In 1925, the first sisters were sent to train as nurses including Sr Francis Spring and in 1935 the first hospital, Mount Alvernia, was opened in Guildford (UK). Mother Francis Spring was elected Mother General in 1937.

In 1942, the Missionary Sisters of Saint Francis established their first foundation outside of Britain with a small maternity hospital/nursing home in the Mount Pleasant section of Ballinasloe. John Dignan, Bishop of Clonfert, invited them to found a hospital and to that end donated land in the Brackernagh area. In 1945 Portiuncula Hospital opened.

In 1947, the Congregation adopted the name Franciscan Missionaries of the Divine Motherhood and became a Congregation of Pontifical Right.

== Areas of concern ==
In 2022, the order was present in nine countries.

In 2026 the congregation works in the following areas;

- Living the Gospel and sharing God’s love
- Spiritual and pastoral care
- Health
- Education and empowerment
- Partnerships
- Outreach
- Caring for creation
- Poverty relief
- Famine relief
