= Seán Silke =

Irish hurler

Personal information
- Native name: Seán Ó Síoda (Irish)
- Born: 27 September 1950 (age 76) Meelick, County Galway, Ireland
- Occupation: Personnel officer
- Height: 5 ft 10 in (178 cm)

Sport
- Sport: Hurling
- Position: Centre-back
Club
- Years: Club
- Meelick-Eyrecourt
Club titles
- Galway titles: 0
Inter-county*
Years	County	Apps (scores)
1972-1984	Galway	27 (0-00)
Inter-county titles
- All-Irelands: 1
- NHL: 1
- All Stars: 2
- *Inter County team apps and scores correct as of 21:05, 4 February 2014.

Seán Silke (born 27 September 1950) is an Irish retired hurler who played as a centre-back for the Galway senior team.

Born in Meelick, County Galway, Silke first played competitive hurling in his youth. He made his first impression on the inter-county scene when he made his senior debut during the 1971-72 National Hurling League. Silke went on to play a key role for Galway for over a decade, and won one All-Ireland medal and one National Hurling League medal. He was an All-Ireland runner-up on three occasions.

As a member of the Connacht inter-provincial team at various times throughout his career, Silke won two Railway Cup medal. At club level he played with Meelick-Eyrecourt, winning junior and intermediate championship medals.

With St. Patrick's College, Maynooth, Silke won two Fitzgibbon Cup medals, the only time the college has been successful in the competition.

Throughout his career Silke made 27 championship appearances for Galway. His retirement came following the conclusion of the 1984 championship.

Silke is widely regarded as one of Galway's greatest-ever hurlers. He has often been voted onto teams made up of the sport's greats, including at centre-back on the Galway Hurling Team of the Millennium and on the Fitzgibbon Cup Team of the Century.

In retirement from playing, Silke became involved in team management and coaching. He has served as a selector with the Galway senior team, as well as manager of the Galway junior team and the Ireland hurling-shinty team.

== Honours ==
=== Player ===
St Patrick's College, Maynooth

- Fitzgibbon Cup (2): 1972-73, 1973–74

Galway

- All-Ireland Senior Hurling Championship (1): 1980
- National Hurling League (1): 1974-75

Connacht

- Railway Cup (2): 1980, 1982

=== Manager ===
Galway

- National Hurling League (1): 2004

=== Individual ===
Awards

- All-Star (2): 1975, 1980
