= Béibhinn Parsons =

Ireland international rugby union player

- Born: Béibhinn Parsons; 30 November 2001 (age 24) Ballinasloe, County Galway
- Height: 170 cm (5 ft 7 in)
- Weight: 72 kg (159 lb)

Rugby union career
- Position: Winger
Senior career
Years	Team	Apps	(Points)
- Blackrock College
Provincial / State sides
Years	Team	Apps	(Points)
- Connacht
International career
Years	Team	Apps	(Points)
2017–	Ireland	31	(90)
- Correct as of 7 September 2025
National sevens team
Years	Team		Comps
2019–	Ireland		

Béibhinn Parsons (born 30 November 2001) is an Ireland women's rugby union international. She plays wing for Blackrock College RFC, Connacht and the Ireland women's national rugby union team. She made her senior international debut in 2018 aged 16, making her the youngest player, male or female, to play senior rugby for the Irish Rugby Football Union.

She won the 2020 Guinness Rugby Writers of Ireland Player of the Year Award, and was nominated as RTÉ Young Sportsperson of the Year in 2021.

== Club career ==
Parsons was one of only two girls playing when she started rugby with Ballinasloe RFC's Mixed Under-11 team and played with them in an All-Ireland Community Games final. When she was no longer allowed to play with boys she returned to playing ladies' Gaelic football but the club eventually got enough players to set up a girls' team.

In 2018, she led her school Ardscoil Mhuire to the All-Ireland girls' Seven's title and also impressed for her province, scoring a hat-trick against Leinster to help Connacht win their first ever Under-18 interprovincial title.

In 2018, she was selected to play U-18 Sevens for Ireland (who were coached by future Ireland VX's head coach Adam Griggs) and soon after made her Connacht senior debut, against Munster.

When she moved to Dublin to study in late 2020, she joined All-Ireland League side Blackrock College.

== International career ==
Despite the fact that she was too young, under Irish Rugby Union rules, to play senior club or inter-provincial rugby, Ireland head coach Adam Griggs fast-tracked Parsons into the Ireland women's national rugby union squad when she was just 16.

When she played as a replacement in the 2018 Autumn Internationals she became Ireland's youngest senior rugby international. She almost scored a try with her first touch in the 19–10 loss to USA and also came off the bench in Ireland's 37–15 loss to England.

In January 2019, having turned 17, she was part of Ireland's squad at the Sydney leg of the World Rugby Sevens Series. She scored a try against Fiji to help Ireland finish fourth.

Parsons made her full Ireland XVs debut as a replacement against France in the 2019 Women's Six Nations Championship and was a starter against Wales, when she scored her first try of the competition.

In the summer of 2019, she helped Ireland's U-18 Sevens to second place at the World Games in Paris and scored a hat-trick of tries when Connacht beat Munster in the senior interprovincial semi-finals.

She started on the wing for Ireland in the 2020 Women's Six Nations Championship, scoring an intercept try against Scotland and another against Wales. She took a break from the remainder of the competition to concentrate on her final secondary school exams (Leaving Certificate) but when the competition was disrupted by COVID-19, she returned in time to play against Italy in October.

Parsons started on the left wing in all of Ireland's 2021 Women's Six Nations games and scored two tries in their 45–0 victory of Wales.

She played a role in the Irish women's Sevens team becoming the first ever to win a World Series silver medal in February 2022, in Spain, scoring a try in the final as Ireland led Australia 12–0 before finishing 17–12 behind. She was named in the Ireland squad for the 2022 Rugby World Cup Sevens – Women's tournament held in Cape Town, South Africa in September 2022.

She represented Ireland at the 2024 Summer Olympics in Paris.

She was named in Ireland's XVs side for the 2025 Six Nations Championship in March. She was selected in the Irish squad for the 2025 Rugby World Cup in England.

== Personal life ==
Parsons is an 'Ad Astra' scholarship student at University College Dublin where she started a degree in Biomedical, Health and Life Sciences in 2020–2021.

The County Mayo footballer Tom Parsons is her first cousin.

== Honours ==
- Irish Rugby Writers 2020 Women's Player of the Year
- Try of the Round in Week 2 of 2021 Women's Six Nations
