= Colm Reilly =

Irish rugby union player

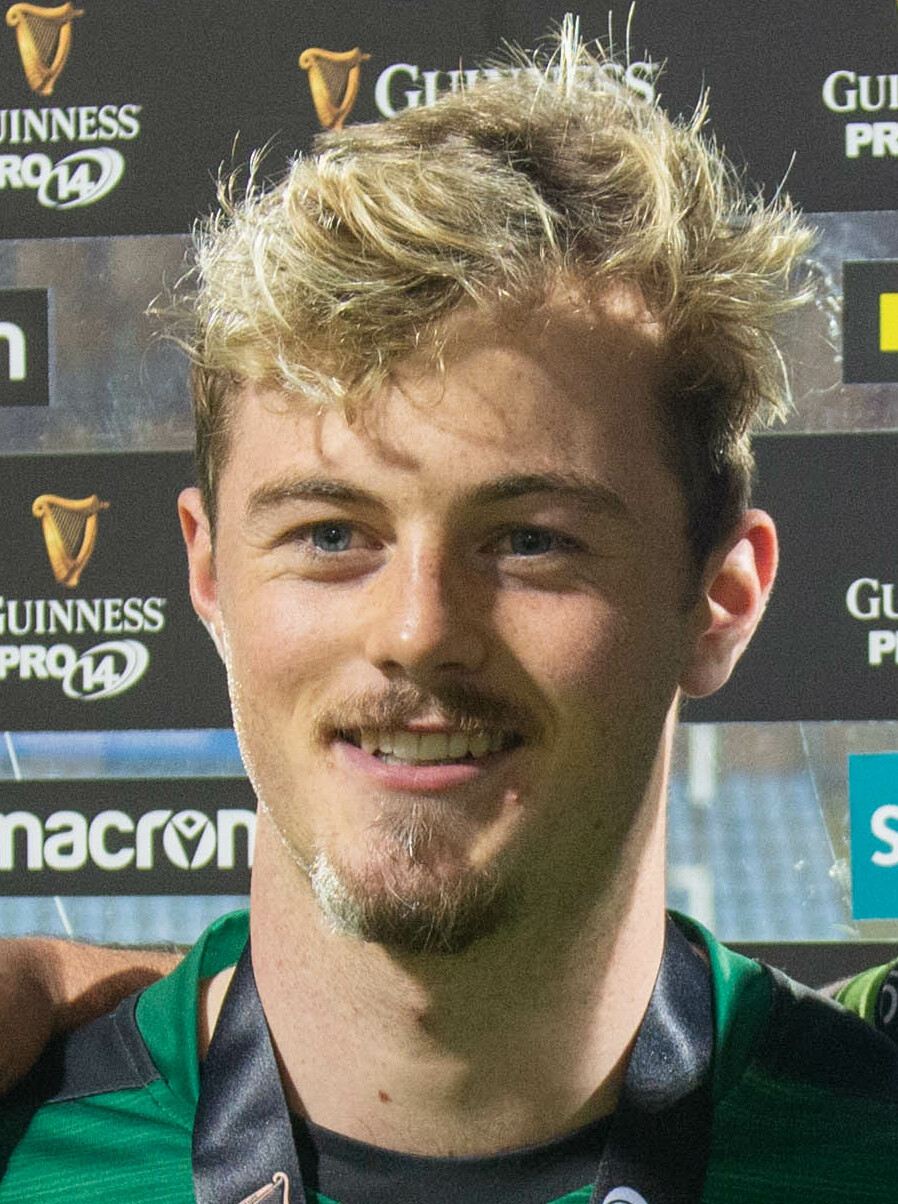
- Born: Colm Reilly; 8 September 1999 (age 27) Ballinasloe, County Galway
- Height: 1.76 m (5 ft 9 in)
- Weight: 78 kg (12 st 4 lb)
- School: Garbally College

Rugby union career
- Position: Scrum-half
- Current team: Connacht
Senior career
| Years | Team | Apps | (Points) |
| 2020– | Connacht | 35 | (5) |
- Correct as of 25 April 2026
International career
| Years | Team | Apps | (Points) |
| 2019 | Ireland U20 | 4 | (5) |
- Correct as of 26 October 2020

Colm Reilly (born 8 September 1999) is an Irish rugby union player for Connacht in the URC. Reilly's primary position is scrum-half.

He is the son of Stephen Reilly, a former principal of Garbally College. His sister Aoibheann also plays scrum half for Connacht and Ireland.

== Rugby career ==
Reilly came through the Connacht academy, signing his first professional contract in June 2020. He debuted for Connacht in October 2020 in Round 3 of the 2020–21 Pro14 against Edinburgh.
