= Creagh (civil parish) =

Civil parish of Ballinasloe County Galway and County Roscommon

Creagh is a civil parish located in the counties of Galway and Roscommon. It is the civil parish of Ballinasloe, County Galway.

== Townlands ==
Creagh has 40 townlands:

=== County Roscommon ===
- Ardcarn
- Atticorra
- Attyrory
- Ballygortagh
- Ballyhugh
- Beagh Brabazon
- Beagh Naghten
- Beagh Trench
- Beaghbeg
- Bellagill
- An Choilleach Bheag
- Clarary
- Cloonaghbrack
- Clooneen
- Coolderry
- Cuilleen
- Culliagharny
- Culliaghbeg
- Glentaun
- Gortnasharvoge
- Kilgarve
- Laughil
- Meadow
- Newtown
- Parkmore
- Rooaun Bog and Meadow
- Sralea
- Suckfield
- Tóin le Móin
- Tonalig
- Tonlemone
- Tulrush

=== County Galway ===
- Ashford
- Atticorra
- Cleaghbeg
- Cleaghgarve
- Creagh
- Glentaun
- Kilgarve
- Parkmore
- Portnick
- Rooaun
- Townparks
