= Ballinasloe =

Town in County Galway, Ireland

Ballinasloe Béal Átha na Sluaighe (Irish)
- Town
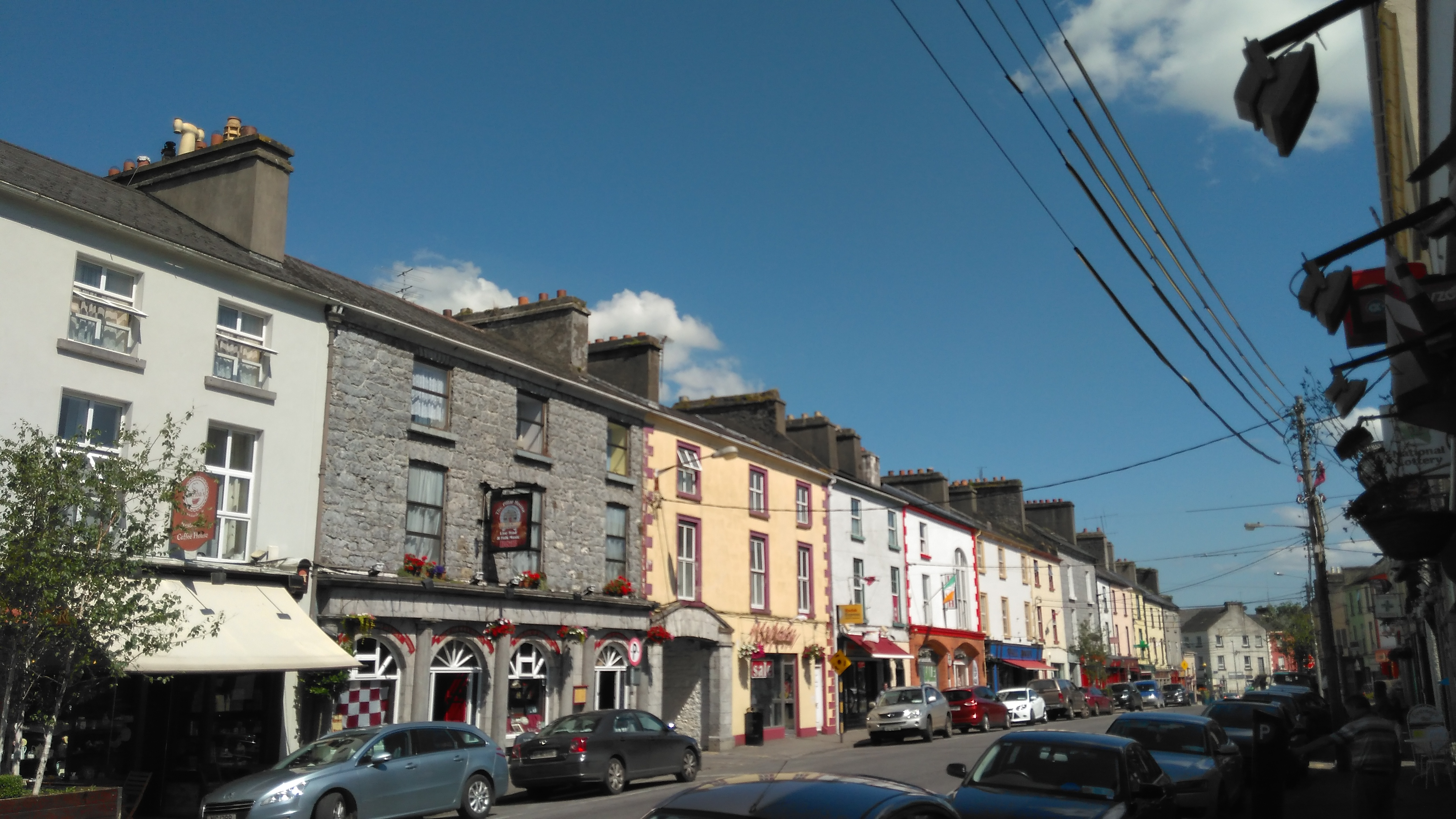
- Society Street

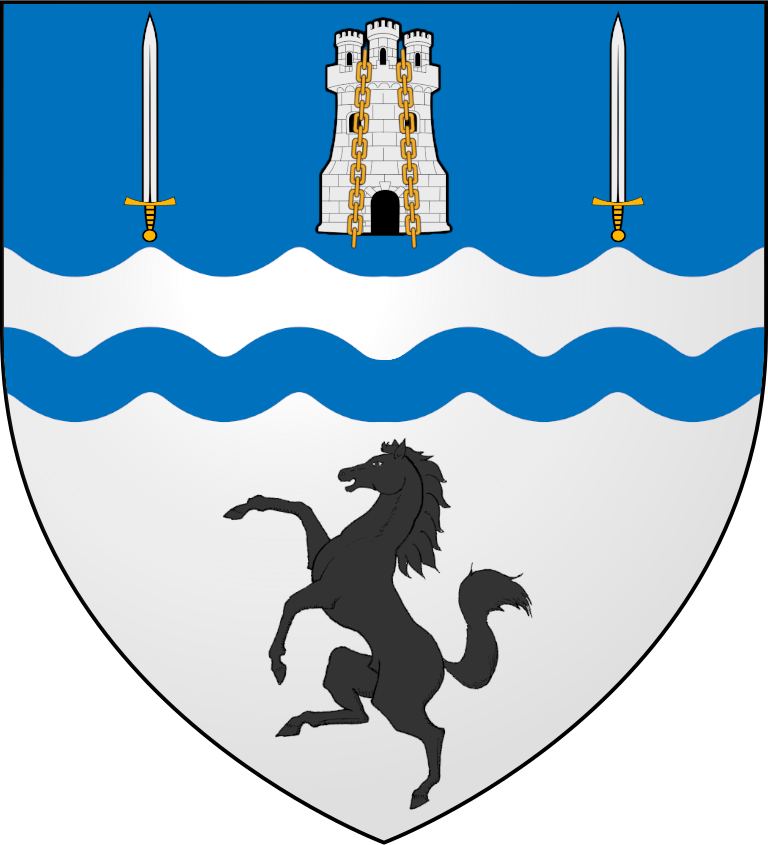
- Coat of arms

- Location in Ireland
- Coordinates: 53.3275°N 8.2194°W
- Country: Ireland
- Province: Connacht
- County: County Galway; County Roscommon
- Local authority: Galway County Council
- Dáil constituency: Roscommon–Galway
- Civil parishes: Kilcloony; Creagh; Moore

Area
  - Total: 8.6 km^{2} (3.3 sq mi)

Population (2022)
  - Total: 6,597
  - Density: 770/km^{2} (2,000/sq mi)
- Eircode routing key: H53
- Telephone area code: +353 90
- Irish Grid Reference: M854307
- Website: ballinasloe.ie

Historical population
Year	Pop.	±%
1821	1,811	—
1831	4,615	+154.8%
1841	4,934	+6.9%
1851	3,679	−25.4%
1861	3,909	+6.3%
1871	5,052	+29.2%
1881	4,772	−5.5%
1891	4,642	−2.7%
1901	4,904	+5.6%
1911	5,169	+5.4%
1926	5,245	+1.5%
1936	5,834	+11.2%
1946	5,421	−7.1%
1951	5,596	+3.2%
1956	5,489	−1.9%
1961	5,711	+4.0%
1966	5,828	+2.0%
1971	5,969	+2.4%
1981	6,481	+8.6%
1986	6,227	−3.9%
1991	5,812	−6.7%
1996	5,654	−2.7%
2002	6,101	+7.9%
2006	6,158	+0.9%
2011	6,659	+8.1%
2016	6,662	+0.0%
2022	6,597	−1.0%

Ballinasloe (/ˌbælnəˈsloʊ/ bal-na-SLOH; Irish: Béal Átha na Sluaighe, meaning 'mouth of the ford of the crowds') is a town in the easternmost part of County Galway, Ireland, situated on the River Suck, which forms the boundary with County Roscommon. Located at an ancient crossing point on the river, evidence of ancient settlement in the area includes a number of Bronze Age sites. Built around a 12th-century castle, which defended the fording point, the modern town of Ballinasloe was "founded" in the early 13th century. As of the 2022 census, it was one of the largest towns in County Galway, with a population of 6,597 people.

== History ==
The town developed as a crossing point on the River Suck, a tributary of the Shannon, which forms the boundary between counties Galway and Roscommon. The part of Ballinasloe east of the river lies in the civil parish of Creagh, County Roscommon, while the larger part west of the river is in Kilclooney, County Galway. The Irish placename – meaning the 'mouth of the ford of the crowds' – reflects this purpose.

The patron saint of Ballinasloe is Saint Grellan, who tradition believes built the first church in the area. A local housing estate, a GAA club, the branch of Conradh na Gaeilge, and formerly a school are named after him.

While there is evidence of more ancient settlement in the area (including crannog and ringfort sites in Garbally Demesne), Richard Mór de Burgh (c.1194–c.1242) is credited with founding the town in the early 13th century.

A castle was built in Ballinasloe on the east bank of the Suck in the 12th or early 13th centuries. This was later rebuilt or expanded by the O'Kellys of Hy-Many in the 14th century. The ruins of the outer wall of this structure remain visible today.

Ballinasloe is historically known for its limestone which was used in many public buildings in the town. The local Garda (police) station, built c.1840 as a terraced three-storey house, is built of cut limestone which indicates the relative prosperity of the town in the 19th century. A courthouse in the town, built c.1840, features roofs and walls built of limestone.

Much of Ballinasloe's town centre was laid out in the 18th and early 19th centuries. During the Great Famine, a workhouse was opened in the town in 1842 at a cost of £9,500. The building's chimney stacks, sills and walls were partially built of limestone. It was designed to house a maximum capacity of 1,000 people, but the 1851 census showed that the building housed 2,487 inmates. During the mid-1840s, a 64-bed fever hospital was built at the northeast of the workhouse with wards transformed to use as convalescent accommodation. Today, only the main block of the workhouse fever hospital survives.

During the 2009 floods in Ireland, the River Suck burst its banks and caused major flooding in Ballinasloe. About 40 families were evacuated by boat after the flooding caused over €8 million worth of damage in the town, with a number of buildings left under water for several weeks.

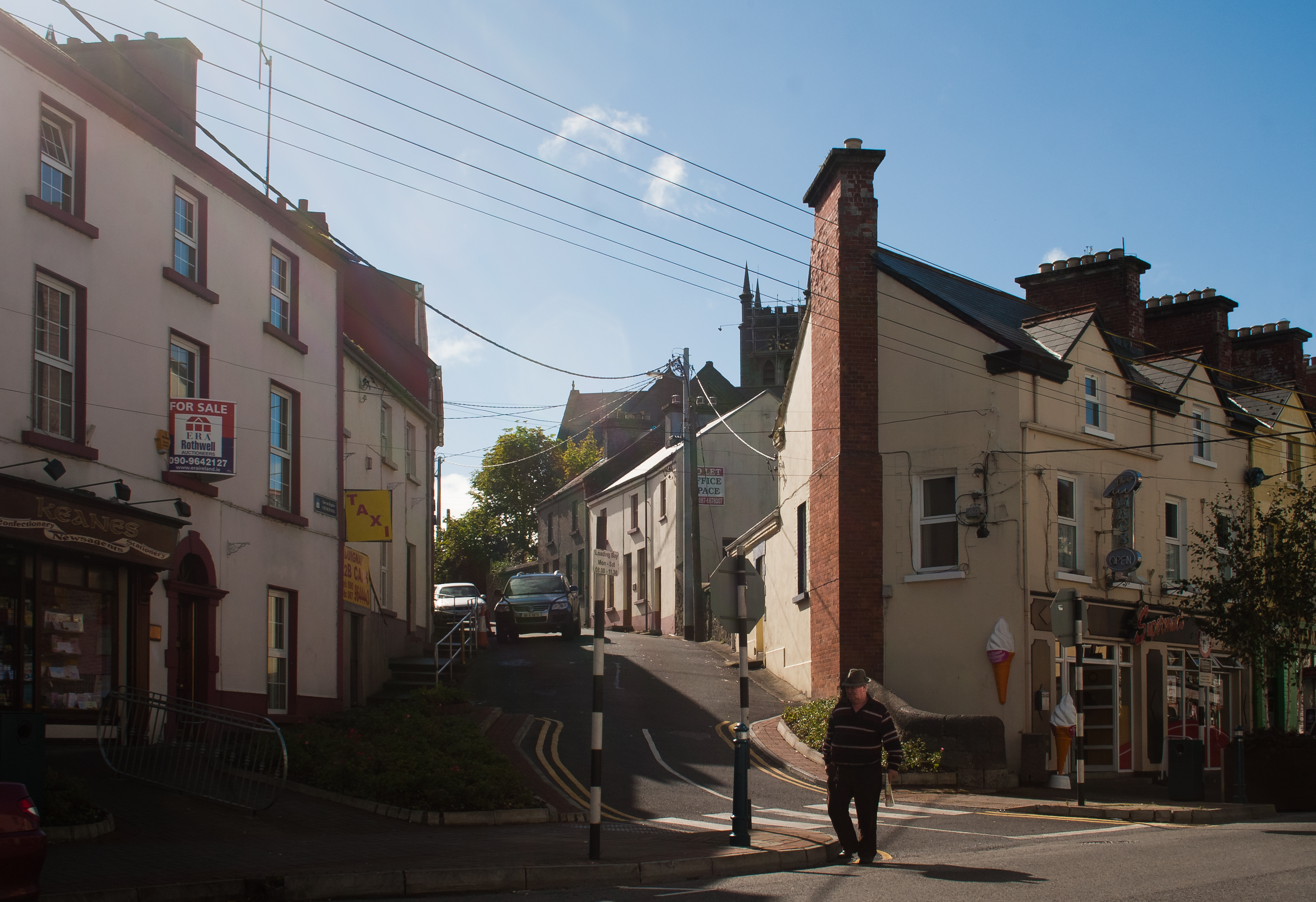
Church Hill on Society Street, where the archaeological survey was undertaken

An archaeological survey, undertaken in September 2021 as part of a street enhancement programme in the town, revealed a number of human skeletons and 17-century artefacts, 12 centimetres below existing footpaths.

== Economy ==
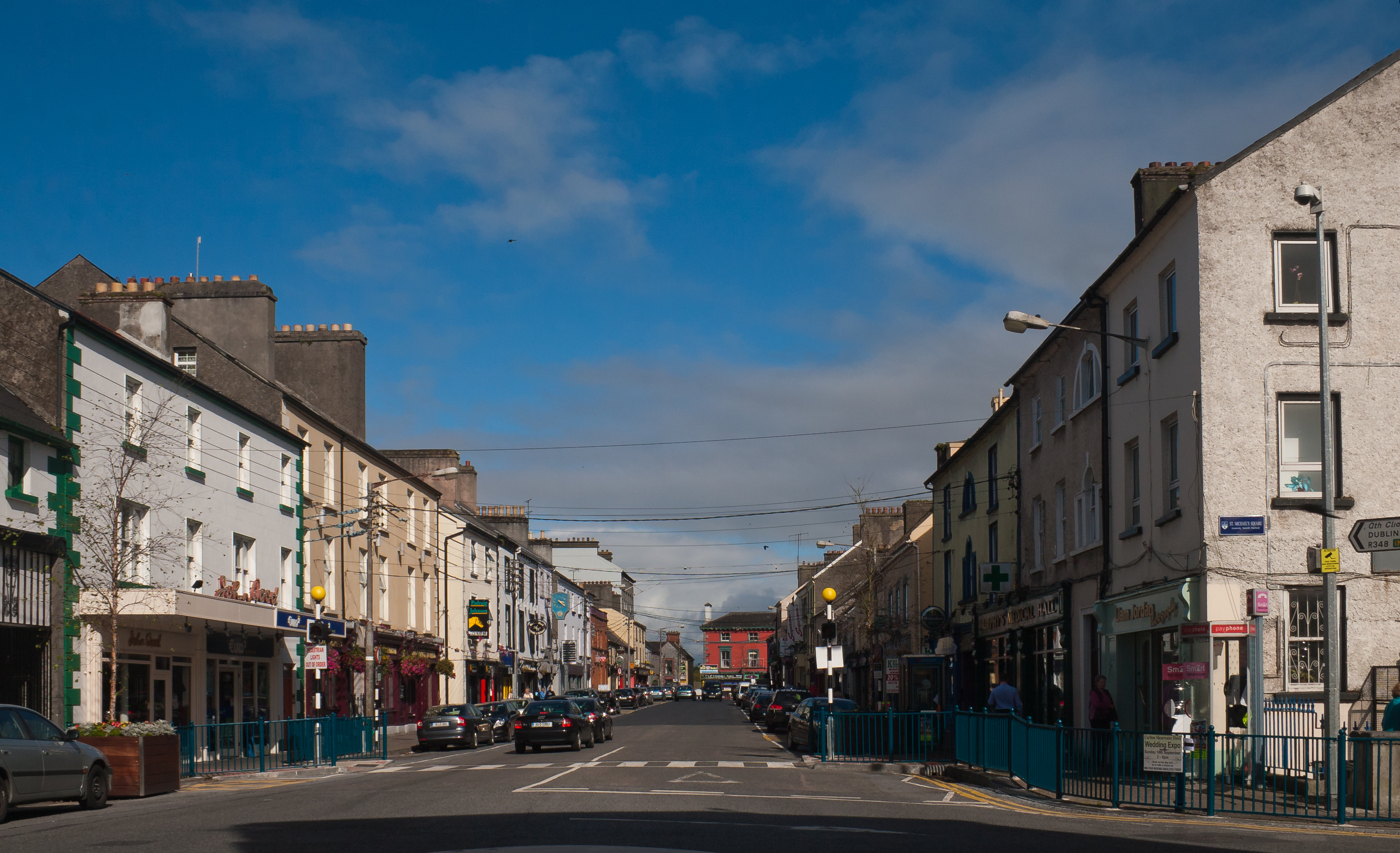
Main Street, Ballinasloe, where the first Supermac's restaurant is located

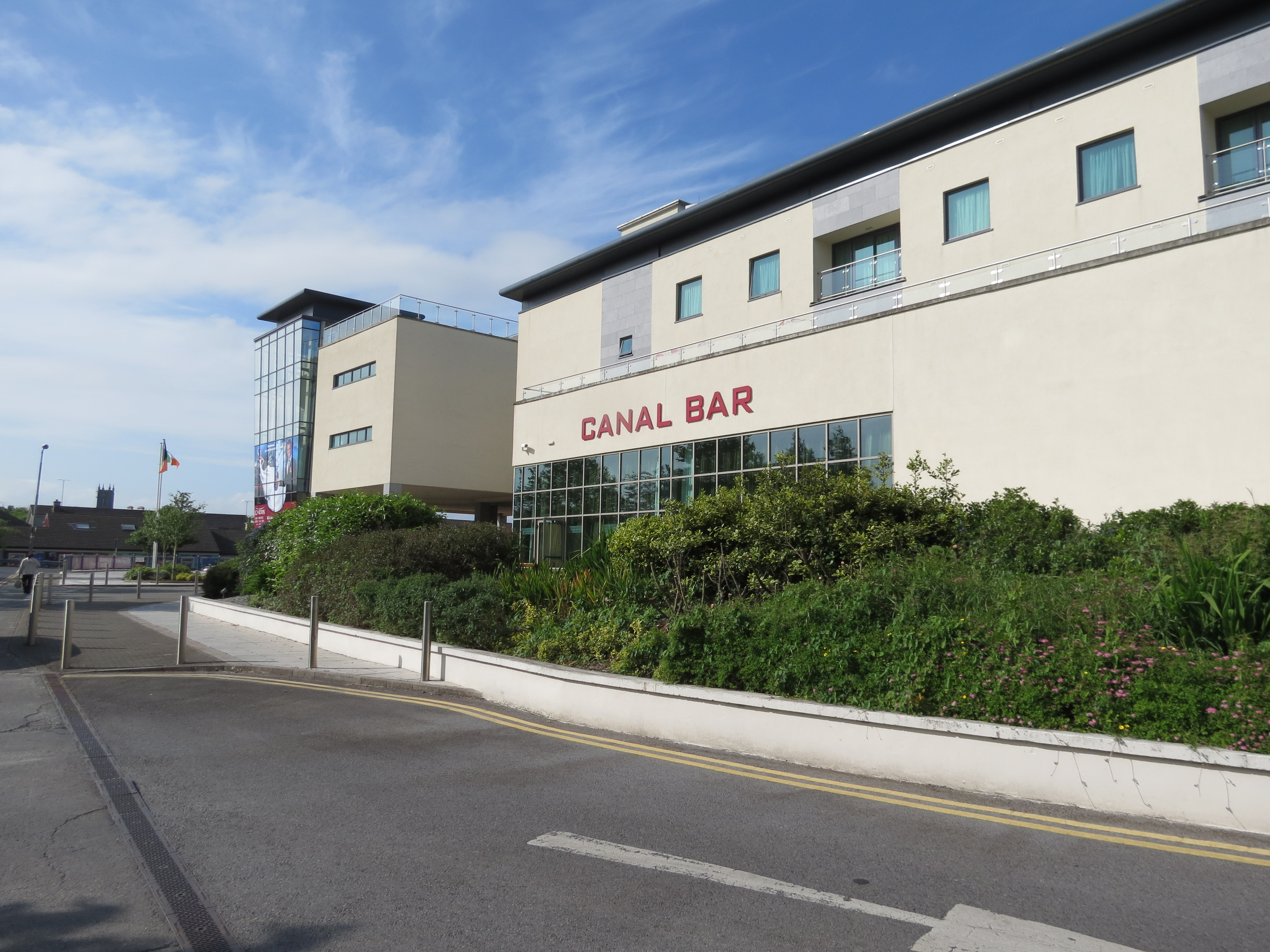
Shearwater Hotel at Marina Point, Ballinasloe

Fast-food restaurant Supermac's opened its first restaurant in Ballinasloe in 1978. As of 2019, the restaurant chain had grown to 116 locations, including three stores in the town.

Ballinasloe traditionally had an agricultural economy, though the 1980s and 1990s saw a number of factories locate in the town. Local employers include Surmodics, a medical company with premises in the 39-acre Business & Technology Park.

Another contributor to the local economy is the Enterprise Centre. Managed by the Ballinasloe Area Community Development (BACD), it is located on the outskirts of Ballinasloe along the Creagh Road. As of mid-2020, there were 26 enterprises based in the centre, with nine more regularly using the training, meeting and hot-desk facilities. In July 2021, Tánaiste and Minister for Enterprise, Trade and Employment Leo Varadkar visited the Enterprise Centre as part of a campaign to raise awareness of the advice available from the government about blended and remote work. In May 2024, the BACD celebrated its 25th anniversary and opened the town's Enterprise Hub on Society Street, providing office space, workspaces and a meeting room.

The footwear and clothing company, Dubarry of Ireland, is headquartered in Creagh, Ballinasloe. In November 2004, Dubarry ceased its manufacturing facility in the town, however, its product development, marketing and distribution departments, remain in Ballinasloe.

Businesses in the town centre include Gullane's Hotel, a three-star hotel and conference centre, which has served the area since 1943. The Shearwater Hotel, a four-star hotel, leisure centre and gym, is located at Marina Point.

During 2020, the future of the Aptar factory in Ballinasloe was questioned, and several TDs called for a taskforce on the issue. In August 2020, Aptar confirmed it would cease operations at the facility, with the loss of 115 jobs, stating that industrial equipment would be transferred to other Aptar global sites by the end of 2020.

In April 2020, an online community marketplace was launched which allowed shoppers to continue to buy locally and support the community, as shops closed during the COVID-19 pandemic.

Irish discount store chain, Mr. Price, opened a store in the town in 2022.

In June 2019, planning permission was granted for a five-screen Omniplex cinema to be built near the Tesco store in the town. Construction began in March 2022, with the single-storey cinema opening in May 2023.

== Places of interest ==
Places of interest in the surrounding area include:

- The Battle of Aughrim Interpretive Centre is located in Aughrim, a village seven kilometres (4 1/2 miles) west of Ballinasloe. The centre offers insight on how three rival European Kings – William III, James II, and Louis XIV – took hold of Ireland in their struggle for power, gathering at Aughrim in 1691.
- Clontuskert Abbey is a National Monument, located approximately 7 km from the town. The cloister and church of the medieval priory are open-access to the public.
- Hymany Way is a hiking trail between Portumna and Aughrim, following the banks of the River Shannon. The trail passes through Ballinasloe.
- Famine Remembrance Park is a Famine memorial park located approximately 1 km from the town centre in Cleaghmore.

== Transport ==
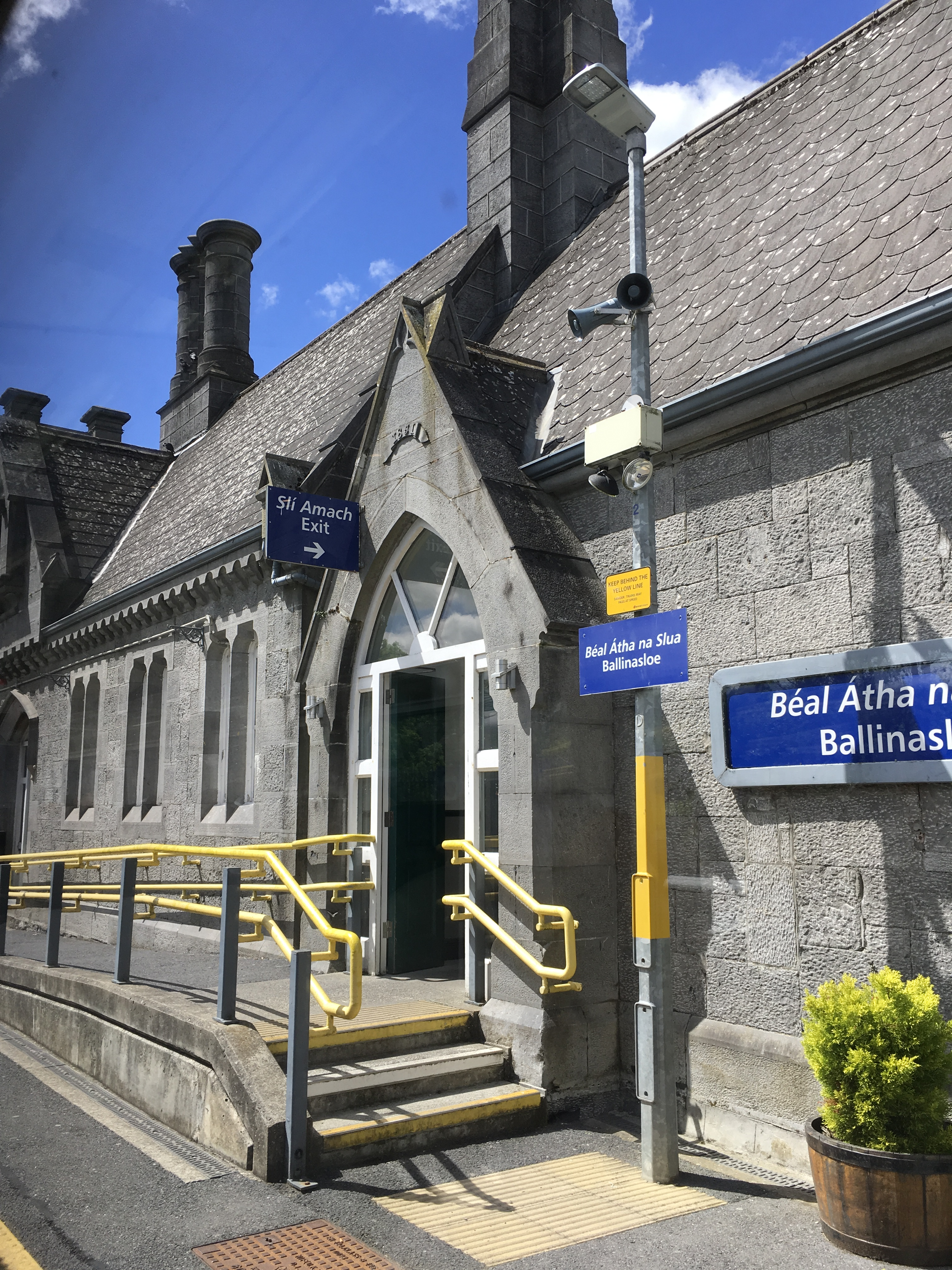
Ballinasloe railway station entrance

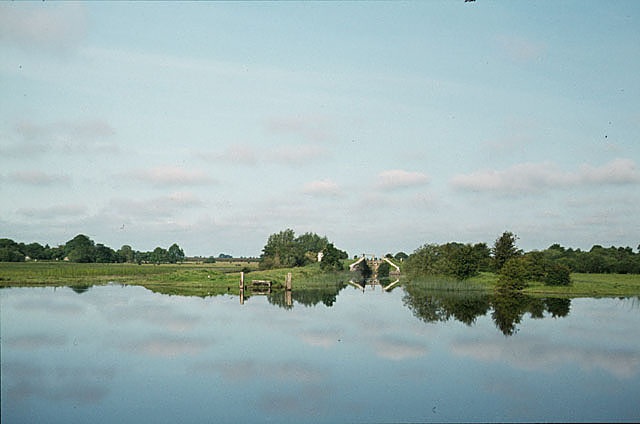
The Grand Canal extended across the River Shannon with a branch to Ballinasloe

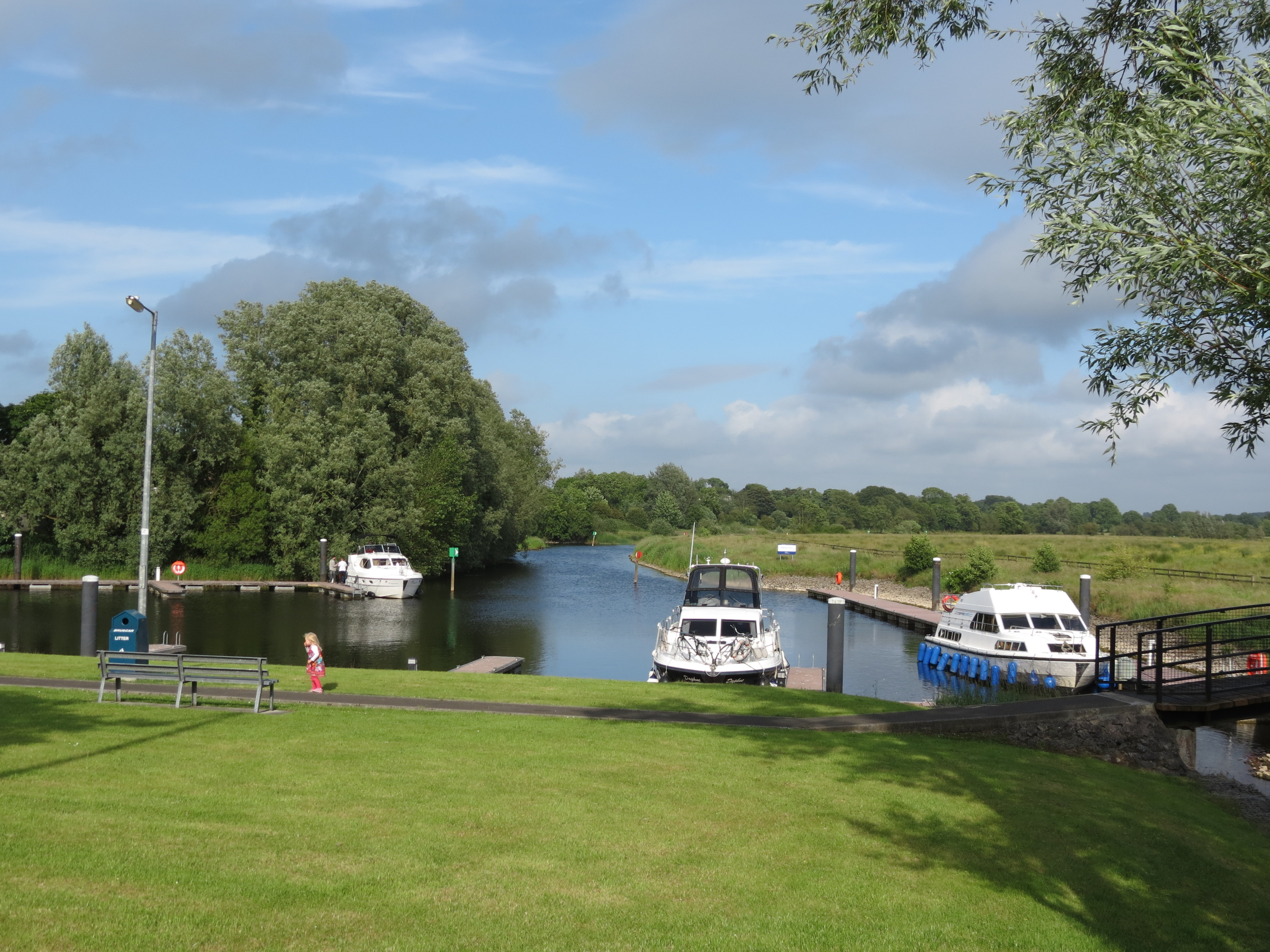
Marina at Ballinasloe

=== Road ===
Once a notorious traffic jam on the old Galway to Dublin road, Ballinasloe is now bypassed by the M6 motorway. The motorway was opened on 18 December 2009 as the N6 was upgraded.

The town can also be accessed by public bus, with CityLink serving the town on their Dublin to Galway route. Bus Éireann and Aircoach previously served the town, but announced in September 2020 and March 2024 respectively that it would end its Dublin to Galway services.

=== Bicycle ===
The Athlone to Galway Cycleway is a planned long-distance cycling and walking greenway that passes through Ballinasloe en route to Galway city. The route selection process was completed in December 2021, as part of the Dublin–Galway Greenway, following a long consultation process that began in 2014, with Ballinasloe being the first stop in the west.

=== Rail ===
The Ballinasloe railway station opened on 1 August 1851, and is served by the Dublin–Galway railway line.

=== Water ===
From 1828 to the 1960s, Ballinasloe was the terminus of the Grand Canal. Guinness Company used the town's canal stores to store and distribute the Guinness to the midlands. The Grand Canal provided a route for Guinness barges to travel from Dublin to Shannon Harbour. The town features a public marina which was developed on the River Suck to allow traffic from the Shannon Navigation to access the town.

== Events ==
Ballinasloe hosts a number of annual events and festivals throughout the year.

=== October Fair ===
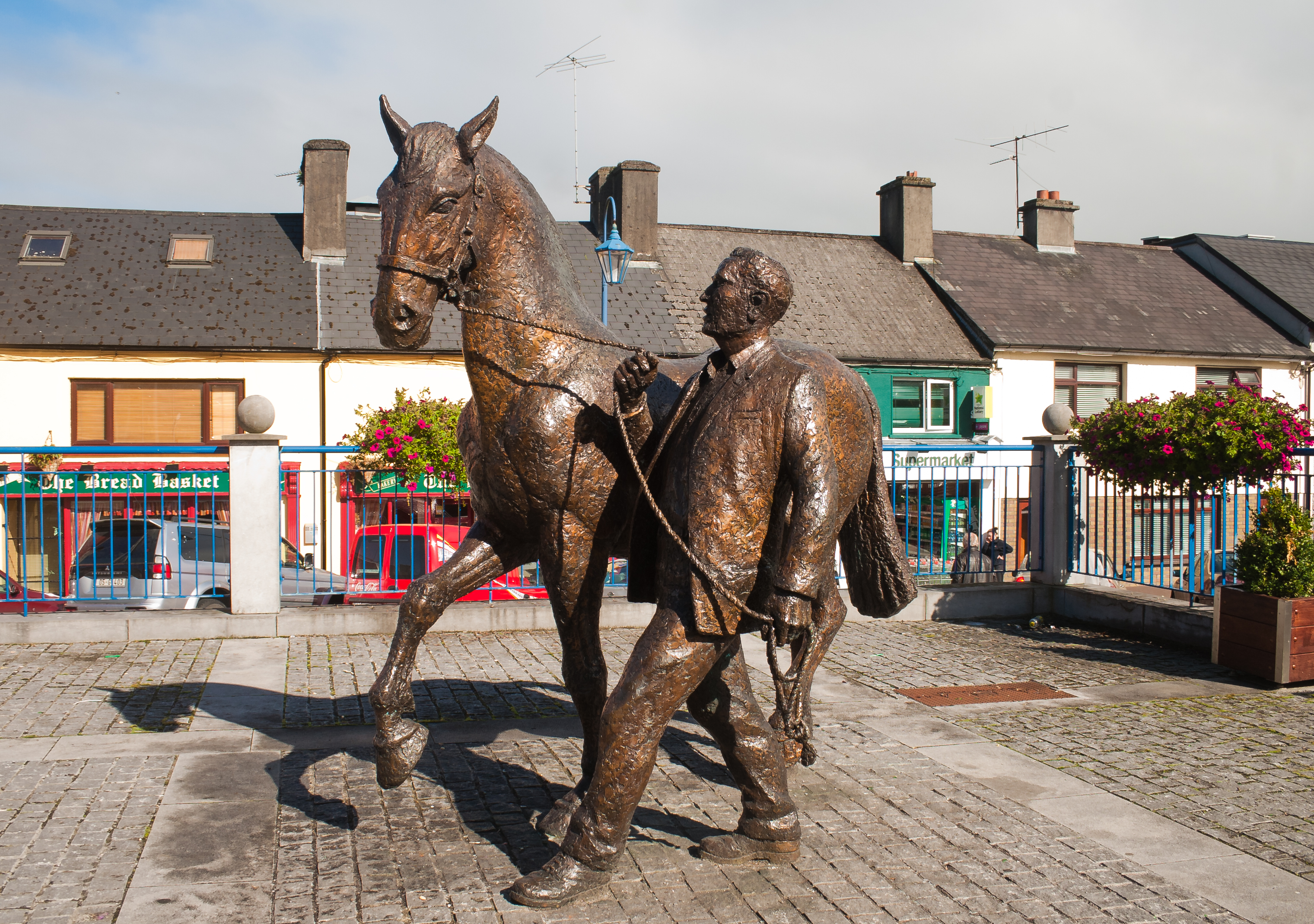
Sculpture by James McCarthy which monumentalises the Ballinasloe Horse Fair

The Ballinasloe Horse Fair is held annually in October. It is reputedly the oldest horse fair in Europe and dates back to the 18th century. Chiefly agricultural in the past, it is now focused on the horse, and the associated festival attracts up to 80,000 visitors. A large market typically takes place, along with a number of events, fireworks, a dog show and a fun fair beside Ballinasloe's town theatre. The 2020 and 2021 events were cancelled as part of Ireland's response to the COVID-19 pandemic. The event returned in 2022, marking the 300th anniversary of the fair.

=== Larry Reynolds' Weekend ===
The Larry Reynolds' Weekend is a celebration of traditional Irish music. The event has run annually since 2014, in commemoration of Larry Reynolds, a former Ballinasloe native who emigrated to the United States in 1953 and brought the east Galway style of music to Boston. The festival sees a number of traditional music performances in the different bars around town. What would have been the seventh event, due to have taken place in September 2020, was cancelled due to the COVID-19 pandemic.

=== Dinny Delaney Festival ===
The Dinny Delaney Festival is an annual traditional music festival, celebrating the traditions of uilleann pipes, in commemoration of Dinny Delaney, a late Ballinasloe native and well-known piper of the late 19th and early 20th centuries. The festival includes concerts, masterclasses, sessions and livestreams.

=== Other events ===
The Strings Festival, a music event focusing on stringed instruments, was hosted by Ballinasloe library in July 2017 and 2018.

A "Zombie Walk" was formerly held at Halloween on the grounds of the Garbally estate. First held in 2015, the event involved "zombie" tour-guides bringing groups through Garbally woods. The event was cancelled from 2023.

The Ballinasloe Town Hall Theatre hosts local groups including Ballinasloe Musical Society's week long musical in March every year, first established in 1923, as well as theatre schools and conference groups. A week long Christmas pantomime is also held annually. First held in 2009, the local community put their own twist on classic fairytales, including Sleeping Beauty in 2017, Aladdin in 2018, Rapunzel in 2019 and Cinderella in 2022.

== Local government ==
Ballinasloe is a local electoral area and a municipal district of County Galway, electing six councillors to Galway County Council. It contains the electoral divisions of:

Ahascragh, Annagh, Aughrim (in the former Rural District of Ballinasloe), Ballinasloe Rural, Ballinasloe Urban, Ballinastack, Ballymacward, Ballymoe, Ballynakill (in the former Rural District of Glenamaddy), Ballynakill (in the former Rural District of Mountbellew), Boyounagh, Caltra, Castleblakeney, Castleffrench, Clonbrock, Clonfert, Clontuskert, Cloonkeen (in the former Rural District of Mountbellew), Cloonkeen (in the former Rural District of Tuam), Colmanstown, Cooloo, Creggs, Curraghmore, Derryglassaun, Glennamaddy, Island, Kellysgrove, Kilconnell, Kilcroan, Killaan, Killallaghtan, Killeroran, Killian, Killure, Kilmacshane, Kiltullagh (in the former Rural District of Glenamaddy), Kylemore, Laurencetown, Lismanny, Mount Bellew, Mounthazel, Raheen, Scregg, Shankill, Taghboy, Templetogher and Toberroe.

Ballinasloe Town Commissioners came into being on 22 February 1841 by order of the Lord Lieutenant of Ireland. The first meeting was held at Craig's Hotel. Rear-Admiral William Le Poer Trench was in the chair and the members included Father Laurence Dillon, P. P.; Rev. Mr. Travers Jones, and representatives of the professional and business interests in the town. Their first responsibility was the public lighting and a gasworks was immediately erected at a cost of £1421.

On 16 March 1880, Ballinasloe was constituted an urban sanitary district and in 1899, this body became Ballinasloe Urban District Council under the Local Government (Ireland) Act 1898. This became a town council in 2002. In common with all town councils, it was abolished in 2014.

In August 2023, a review of Dáil constituencies by the Electoral Commission recommended that Ballinasloe would remain in the Roscommon–Galway constituency after speculation that the review would recommend that the town return to the Galway East constituency.

== Local media ==
Local and regional newspapers include the Ballinasloe Life magazine, the Connacht Tribune, Galway Advertiser, Athlone Topic and the Roscommon Herald. Local radio stations include Galway Bay FM, Shannonside FM, Midlands 103 and iRadio.

Between 1986 and 1988, a pirate radio station "Kandy Radio" was broadcast from Ballinasloe serving the town and its rural hinterland. A log from April 1988 recorded Kandy Radio on 103.5 FM and the station closed down that month. A temporarily licensed station under the banner of "Ballinasloe Community Radio" on 102.8 MHz FM was also broadcast for five years running, which covered the Ballinasloe Horse Fair.

== Hospitals ==
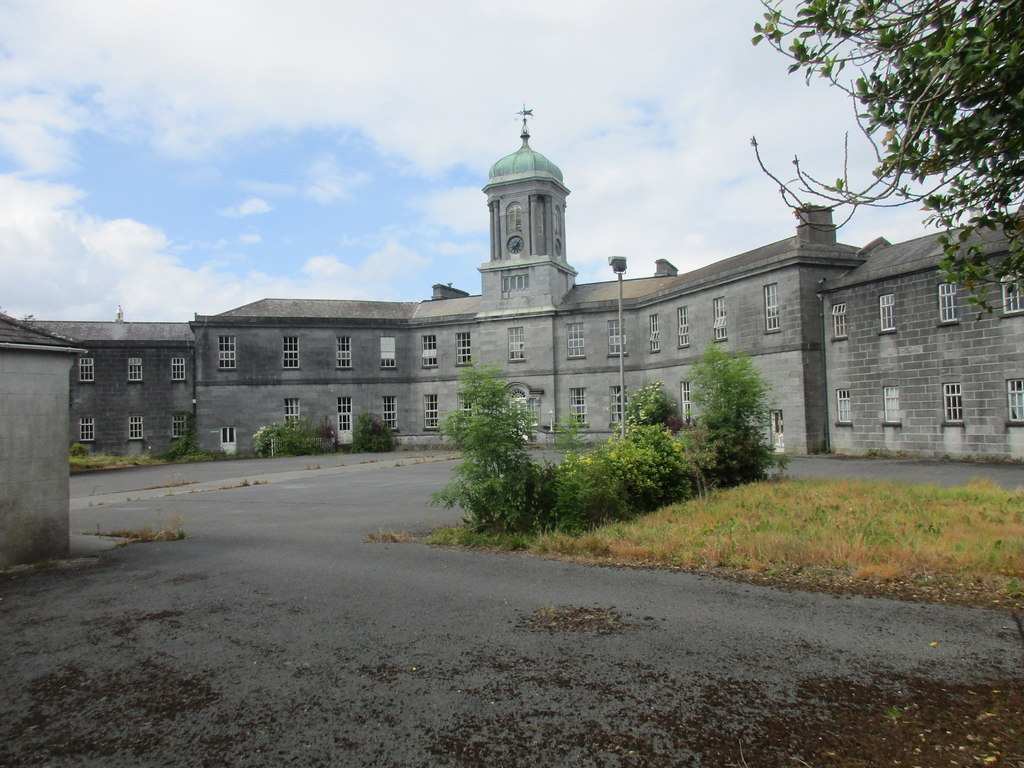
St. Brigid's Hospital in Ballinasloe, near Creagh

Ballinasloe has one university hospital, Portiuncula University Hospital. Opened by the Franciscan Missionaries of the Divine Motherhood in 1943, it is managed by the Saolta University Health Care Group. Ballinasloe had one psychiatric hospital, St. Brigid's Hospital, opened as the Connacht Asylum in 1833. After the introduction of deinstitutionalisation in the late 1980s the hospital went into a period of decline and closed in 2013.

== Sport ==
Ballinasloe has soccer, golf, and rugby clubs, alongside Duggan Park GAA grounds. The local GAA clubs are Ballinasloe GAA (incorporating St Grellan's Gaelic football club and the Ballinasloe Hurling Club), Derrymullen Handball Club and Ballinasloe Camogie Club. The soccer club, Ballinasloe Town AFC, plays its games at The Curragh Grounds in the town.

Ballinasloe also has two resident boxing clubs. Facilities in and near the town include a golf club (established in 1894), an equestrian centre (established in 1994), an athletics club, GAA grounds, tennis club, two swimming pools, 40×20 handball alley, rugby grounds, soccer grounds, driving range, and a recreational track.

== Religion ==
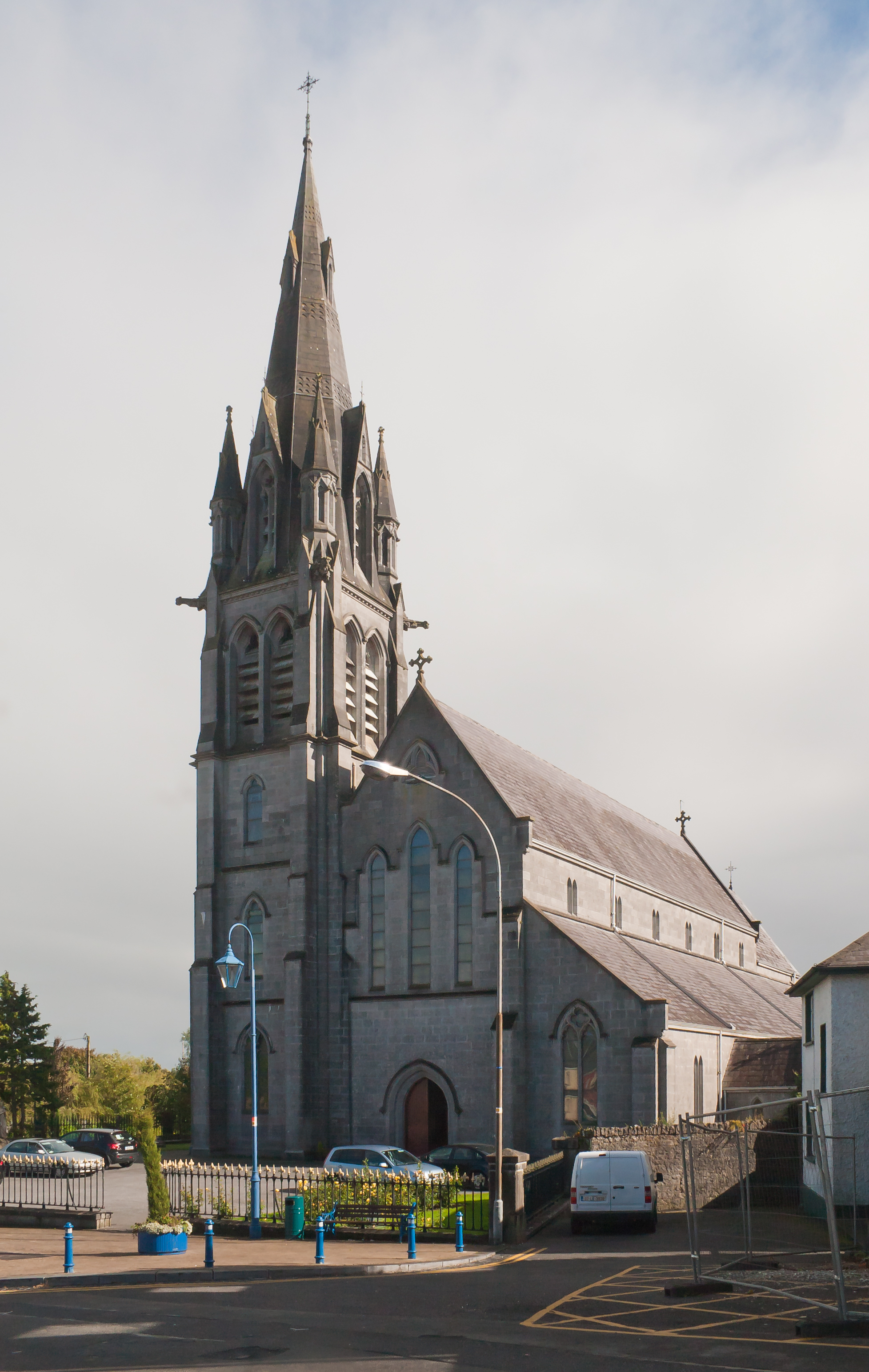
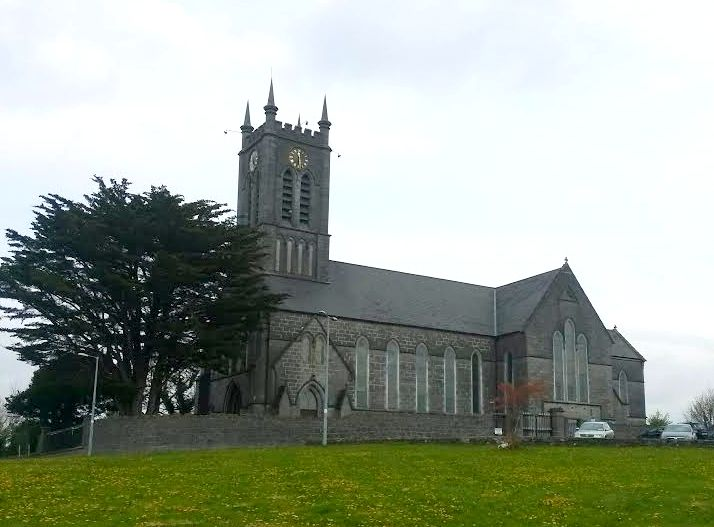
St. Michael's Church and St. John's Church in Ballinasloe.

Ballinasloe has two Catholic churches (St. Michael's Church and Our Lady of Lourdes Church) and one Church of Ireland church (St. John's Church).

== Education ==
In Ballinasloe there are four national schools (Scoil Uí Cheithearnaigh, Creagh National School, Scoil an Chroí Naofa and St Teresa's Special School), one secondary school (Clonfert College, following the amalgamation of Garbally College and Ardscoil Mhuire), and a further education college providing adult education courses. In addition, there are four driving schools in and near the town, as well as a dance school located on Society Street. Ballinasloe is home to one of three National Ambulance Service College campuses in Ireland, which trains paramedics and intermediate care operatives.

On 12 November 2021, Taoiseach Micheál Martin and Minister for Education Norma Foley visited Ballinasloe to announce the approval of a new eight classroom building for St Teresa's Special School.

== Twin towns ==
Ballinasloe has been twinned with Chalonnes-sur-Loire, in Maine-et-Loire, France, since 1988.

== People ==
- George Brent (1904–1979) – actor
- Denis Delaney (1841–1919) – piper
- Aisling Dolan (born 1975/1976) – Fine Gael politician and Senator
- Cyril Donnellan (born 1985) – former Galway hurler, current deputy principal of Coláiste Bhaile Chláir
- Cyril Dunne (born 1941) – Gaelic football player
- John Dunne (1911–1990) – Gaelic football coach, player, referee and Gaelic games administrator
- John Feeley (born 1955) – classical guitarist
- Conor Finn (born 1992) – rugby player
- Patrick Green (1824–1889) – VC recipient
- Catherine E. Greene (born 1960) – sculptor
- Saint Grellan (5th Century) – Patron Saint of Ballinasloe
- Desmond Hogan (born 1950) – writer
- Shane Jennings (born 2001) – rugby player
- Denis Madden (born 1948) – Garda Síochána officer
- Noel Mannion (born 1963) – rugby player
- Ray McLoughlin (born 1939) – rugby player and businessman
- Seán William McLoughlin (born 1990) – youtuber, commonly known as Jacksepticeye
- Seán na Maighe Ó Cellaigh (1538–1584) – local chief of western Connacht
- John Kernan Mullen (1847–1929) – Irish-American businessman and philanthropist
- Richie Murray (born 1982) – hurler
- Beibhinn Parsons (born 2001) – Ireland women's rugby union international
- Heather Payne (born 2000) – Irish women's footballer
- John O'Connor Power (1846–1919) – politician
- Colm Reilly (born 1999) – rugby player
- Aoibheann Reilly (born 2000) – Ireland women's rugby union international
- Noel Treacy (1951–2022) – politician
- Eoghan Ó Tuairisc (1919–1982) – poet and writer

== Annalistic references ==
From the Annals of Lough Cé:

- LC1114.3. A hosting by Domhnall Mac Lachlainn to Rath-Cennaigh, when Eochaidh Ua Mathghamhna, with the Ulidians, came into his house, and Donnchadh Ua Loingsigh, with the Dal-Araidhe, and Aedh Ua Ruairc, with the men of Breifne, and Murchadh Ua Maelsechlainn, with the men of Midhe. They all proceeded across Ath-Luain to Dun-Leodha [the original name of Ballinasloe] where Toirdhealbhach Ua Conchobhair, with the Connachtmen, aud Niall, son of Domhnall Mac Lachlainn, with the chieftains of Clann-Conaill, came into his assembly.

== See also ==
- List of towns and villages in Ireland
