= Kermit =

Kermit may refer to:

- Kermit the Frog, The Muppets character
- Kermit Roosevelt (disambiguation), any of several descendants of U. S. President Theodore Roosevelt
- Kermit (given name)
- Kermit, the stage name for Paul Leveridge of Black Grape
- Kermit (protocol), for computer file transfers
- Kermit, Texas
- Kermit, West Virginia
- Kermit (band), an instrumental rock quartet
