= McDiarmid =

McDiarmid, also MacDiarmid, is a Scottish surname.

== People ==
Notable people with this surname include:

=== McDiarmid ===
- Archie McDiarmid (1881–1957), Scottish-born Canadian track and field athlete
- Bunny McDiarmid (contemporary), New Zealand environmental activist
- C. J. McDiarmid (1869–1942), American lawyer and professional baseball executive
- David McDiarmid (1952–1995), Tasmanian-born Australian artist, designer and political activist
- Dorothy Shoemaker McDiarmid (1906–1994), American politician in Virginia and Quaker activist
- Errett Weir McDiarmid (1909–2000), American librarian and academic
- George McDiarmid (1880–1946), Scottish footballer
- Howard McDiarmid (1927–2010), Canadian physician and political figure in British Columbia
- Ian McDiarmid (born 1944), Scottish Tony award theatre actor and director
- Jack McDiarmid (1903–1974), Australian rules footballer
- John McDiarmid (tennis) (1911–1982), American tennis player
- John B. McDiarmid (1913–2002), Canadian academic and military intelligence officer
- John Stewart McDiarmid (1882–1965), Canadian Liberal politician, later Lieutenant Governor of Manitoba
- Matthew McDiarmid (1914–1996), Scottish literary scholar, essayist and poet
- Niall McDiarmid (born 1967), Scottish photographer
- Kevin McDiarmid (born 1969), English born Famous DJ and Music Producer using the pseudonym "K69"
- Lucy McDiarmid (born 2000), English-born talented musician and singer best known for winning Haltons Got Talent and achieving a No.1 music release.
- David McDiarmid (born 1962), English-born alternative sculpture based in Southampton

=== MacDiarmid ===
- Alan MacDiarmid (1927–2007), New Zealand-born American chemist
- Douglas MacDiarmid (1922–2020), New Zealand-born painter active in Paris, France
- Findlay George MacDiarmid (1869–1933), Canadian farmer and political figure in Ontario
- Hugh MacDiarmid (1892–1978), Scottish poet, pen name of Christopher Murray Grieve
- Margaret MacDiarmid (fl. 2009–2013), Canadian politician in British Columbia
- Sarah MacDiarmid (born 1966), Scottish-Australian woman who disappeared in 1990 in Melbourne, Australia
- Toby MacDiarmid (1925–2003), Australian politician
- William MacDiarmid (1875–1947), Canadian politician in Ontario

== Places ==
- MacDiarmid Institute for Advanced Materials and Nanotechnology, in New Zealand
- McDiarmid Falls, a waterfall in British Columbia, Canada
- McDiarmid Park, a stadium in Perth, Scotland
- William McDiarmid House, a historic building in Fayetteville, North Carolina

== See also ==
- MacDermot, an Irish Gaelic family
- McDermid, a Scottish surname
