= Dermot mac Tadhg Mor =

Dermot mac Tadhg Mor, 7th king of Moylurg, reigned from 1124 to 1159. Vassal and kinsman of the O Conchobhair Kings of Connacht. Dermot was the progenitor of the MacDermot family, as well as its offshoot septs such as MacDermot Roe, McDonagh, and Crowley (surname).

Preceded by Maelsechlainn mac Tadhg Mor	King of Moylurg; 1124–1159	Succeeded by Muirgius mac Tadhg More
