= Tomaltach na Cairge mac Diarmata =

Tomaltach na Cairge MacDermot was the King of Moylurg from 1197 until his death in 1207.

== Overview ==
One of Tomaltach's sons, Donnchadh, was the progenitor of the MacDonagh sept. The family later became Kings or Lords of Tirerril in Co. Sligo; the first to be known as such was Tomaltach Mac Donnchadh, Donnchadh MacDermot's grandson, alive in 1315.

== Annalistic extract ==
The following incident is recounted in the annals concerning the MacDermots and their O Mulroony kinsmen:

"Crech mor la Cathal Carrach mac Diarmata mic Taidhg, ar Chorbmac mac Tomaltaigh Mic Diarmata, & ar Ua f-Floinn Eassa, co ruccsat drem do Connachtaibh fair, .i. Diarmait mac Maghnusa mic Muircertaigh Uí Choncobhair, & Corbmac mac Tomaltaigh, Concobhar God O h-Eghra tigherna Luighne, & Donnchadh Ua Dubhda tighearna Ua n-Amhalgadha, & Ua f-Fiachrach go ro chuirsiot cliathaidh go ro muidh for Cathal Charrach, & go ro gabhadh é fein, & go ro dalladh, & ro marbhadh Muirghes a mhac, & Mac Chonghránna Uí Fhlannaccáin co sochaidhibh ele./Cathal Carragh, son of Dermot, who was son of Teige O'Mulrony, took a great prey from Cormac, son of Tomaltagh Mac Dermot, and O'Flynn of the Cataract, but was overtaken by some of the Connacians, namely, Dermot, son of Manus, who was son of Murtough O'Conor; Cormac, son of Tomaltagh; Conor God O'Hara, Lord of Leyny; and Donough O'Dowda, Lord of Tirawley and Tireragh; and a battle ensued, in which Cathal Carragh was defeated. He was taken prisoner, and blinded; and his son, Maurice, with the son of Cugranna O'Flanagan, and many others, were killed (in the battle)."

== mac Diarmata vs. Mac Diarmata ==
Tomaltach's correct surname was Ó Maol Ruanaidh, his father being Diarmait Ó Maol Ruanaidh. The suffix mac Diarmata was at this point merely a Patronymic. Only in the generation subsequent to him and his brothers would it become a new surname, Mac Diarmata.

Preceded by Conchobair MacDermot	King of Moylurg; 1196–1207	Succeeded by Cathal Carrach MacDermot
