= Conchobar mac Diarmata =

12th-century Irish king

Conchobar mac Diarmata was the ninth king of the medieval Irish kingdom of Moylurg, reigning from 1187 to 1196.

== Overview ==
Conchobhair is recorded the year before he became king due to a family tragedy:

"The rock of Lough Key was burned by lightning. Duvesa, daughter of O'Heyn, and wife of Conor Mac Dermot, Lord of Moylurg, with seven hundred (or seven score) others, or more, both men and women, were drowned or burned in it in the course of one hour."

This also demonstrates that the dynasty were already living on the Carrig (the Rock) of Lough Ce by this date.

Conchobhair became King of Moylurg the following year upon Muirgius's death. There is no other notice of him in the annals until 1196, when "Conchubhar Mac Diarmada tighearna Maighe Luirg do dhol h-i n-urd i Mainistir na Búille, & ro ghabh Tomaltach tighearnus dia ési/Conor Mac Dermot, Lord of Moylurg, embraced Orders in the monastery of Boyle; and Tomaltagh assumed the lordship in his stead." His death was recorded as taking place there the following year.

== mac Diarmata vs. Mac Diarmata ==
Conchobar's correct surname was Ó Maol Ruanaidh, his father being Diarmait Ó Maol Ruanaidh. The suffix mac Diarmata was at this point merely a Patronymic. Only in the generation subsequent to him and his brothers would it become a new surname, Mac Diarmata.

Preceded by Muirgius mac Tadhg More	King of Moylurg; 1187 – 1196	Succeeded by Tomaltach na Cairge MacDermot
