= Tadhg mac Muirchertach =

Tadhg mac Muirchertach was one of the early kings of Moylurg, and the most obscure. Even the years of his reign are unknown. All that can be said with certainty is that he lived in the middle decades of the eleventh century and his father was Muirchertach mac Maelruanaidh Mor. He was succeeded by his son, Maelruanaidh mac Tadhg, in or around the year 1080, though this too is an educated guess.

Preceded by Muirchertach mac Maelruanaidh Mor	King of Moylurg ???? – ????	Succeeded by Maelruanaidh mac Tadhg
