= Máel Ruanaid Mór mac Tadg =

Maelruanaidh Mor mac Tadg, first King of Moylurg, and ancestor to all subsequent Kings of Moylurg. He is usually assumed to have lived in or about the year 956.

Maelruanaidh was a son of Tadg mac Cathal (King of Connacht 925–956) and brother to Conchobar mac Tadg, who succeeded as king in 967. Indeed, he could claim no less than ten ancestors as Kings of Connacht since the 6th century. Maelruanaidh is said to have made a deal where, in return for abandoning any claim to the provincial kingship, he would be given Moylurg. His dynasty were known as the Clan Mulrooney, and later still took the surname of MacDermot.

== Sources ==
- "Mac Dermot of Moylurg: The Story of a Connacht Family", Dermot MacDermot, 1996.
- Article title
  Regnal titles
  New title	King of Moylurg; 956 – ???	Succeeded by Muirchertach mac Maelruanaidh Mor
