= Muirchertach mac Maelruanaidh Mor =

Muirchertach mac Maelruanaidh Mor was the second king of Moylurg, but is very obscure; not even the dates of his reign are known. He was succeeded by his son Tadhg.

Preceded by Maelruanaidh Mor mac Tadg	King of Moylurg ??? – ???	Succeeded by Tadhg mac Muirchertach
