= Mac Diarmada =

McDermott Mac Diarmada
- Parent house: Connachta (Uí Briúin Ai)
- Country: Kingdom of Connacht
- Founded: 1123
- Founder: Dermot mac Tadhg Mor
- Final ruler: Tadhg mac Diarmata
- Historic seat: McDermott's Castle
- Titles: King of Moylurg

Mac Diarmada (anglicised as McDermott or MacDermot), also spelled Mac Diarmata, is an Irish surname, and the surname of the ruling dynasty of Moylurg, a kingdom that existed in Connacht from the 10th to 16th centuries. The last ruling king was Tadhg mac Diarmata, who ruled until 1585.

== Naming conventions ==
Male	Daughter	Wife (Long)	Wife (Short)
Mac Diarmada	Nic Dhiarmada	Bean Mhic Dhiarmada	Mhic Dhiarmada

== History ==
The progenitor of the family was Dermot mac Tadhg Mor, 7th King of Moylurg, who reigned from 1124 to 1159. He was a vassal and kinsman of the Ó Conchubhair, Kings of Connacht; their common ancestor was Tadg mac Cathal, King of Connacht from 925 to 956. They were based at McDermott's Castle, Lough Key.

Later offshoot septs of the dynasty included the families of MacDermot Roe.

Moylurg ceased to exist as a kingdom in the late 16th century, though the senior line of the MacDermot's continued to live a sometime poverty-stricken and precarious existence despite land confiscations and the oppression of the Penal Laws. During this era they were popularly accorded the title Prince of Coolavin; the current incumbent is Francis MacDermot, who succeeded by birthright to his father Rory MacDermot who died on 6 May 2021.

== Variants ==
Variations of the name include :

- McDermott
- MacDiarmada, MacDiarmata
- MacDermot Roe, MacDermott Roe
- McDermitt
- McDermett
- McDiarmid, MacDiarmid, Irish and Scottish language variants ultimately from Irish
- McDormand, MacDormand
- Kermode, Manx language variant
  - Kermit, variant of Kermode

and others.

== People ==
=== McDermot and MacDermot ===
- Conchobair MacDermot
- Dermot MacDermot
- Frank MacDermot
- Galt MacDermot (1928–2018), Canadian-American composer, pianist
- Hugh Hyacinth O'Rorke MacDermot
- Niall MacDermot
- Niall Anthony MacDermot
- Rory MacDermot
- Tomaltach na Cairge MacDermot
- Andrew McDermot (1790–1881), Irish-born fur trade merchant
- George McDermot (1841–1917), Irish lawyer, writer and priest
- Murrough McDermot O'Brien, 3rd Baron Inchiquin (1550–1573)

=== McDormand ===
- Frances McDormand, actress

== Places ==
- McDermott Field, a baseball stadium in Idaho that was replaced by Melaleuca Field
- McDermott, Ohio, a census-designated place in western Rush Township, Scioto County, Ohio, United States.

== See also ==
- Kings of Uí Díarmata
- Dermott (disambiguation)
- Irish nobility
- Irish royal families
