= Muirgius mac Tadhg More =

King of Moylurg from 1159 to 1187

Muirgius mac Tadhg More was the eighth king of Moylurg, who reigned from 1159 to 1187, and was brother of the previous king. The Annals of the Four Masters record his death in the latter year with the comment: "Mac Dermot (Maurice, son of Teige), Lord of Moylurg, died in his own mansion on Claenlough, in Clann-Chuain."

Preceded by Dermot mac Tadhg Mor	King of Moylurg; 1159–1187	Succeeded by Conchobair MacDermot
