= Kings of Magh Luirg =

Medieval Irish royal family

The Kings of Magh Luirg or Moylurg were a branch of the Síol Muireadaigh, and a kindred family to the Ua Conchobair Kings of Connacht. Their ancestor, Maelruanaidh Mor mac Tadg, was a brother to Conchobar mac Tadg, King of Connacht 967–973, ancestor of the O Connor family of Connacht. Maelruanaidh Mor mac Tadg is said to have made a deal of some nature where, in return for abandoning any claim to the provincial kingship, he would be given Moylurg. His dynasty was known as the Clan Mulrooney, and later still took the surname of MacDermot (a branch of this family were in turn called MacDermot Roe). The following is a list of their Kings, followed by the respective heads of the family up to the early modern period.

The Kings of Moylurg

- Maelruanaidh Mor mac Tadg, fl. 956 founder of Moylurg and the Clan Maelruanaidh.
- Muirchertach mac Maelruanaidh Mor
- Tadhg mac Muirchertach
- Maelruanaidh mac Tadhg, fl. 1080.
- Tadhg Mor mac Maelruanaidh, 1120–1124.
- Maelsechlainn mac Tadhg Mor, 1124.
- Dermot mac Tadhg Mor, 1124–1159, progenitor of the surname MacDermot.
- Muirgius mac Tadhg More, 1159–1187.
- Conchobar mac Diarmata, 1187–1196.
- Tomaltach na Cairge mac Diarmata, 1196–1207.
- Cathal Carrach mac Diarmata, 1207–1215.
- Dermot mac Diarmata, 1215–1218.
- Cormac mac Diarmata, 1218–1244
- Muirchertach mac Diarmata, 1245–1265
- Tadhg mac Diarmata, 1256–1281.
- Dermot Mideach mac Diarmata, 1281–1287
- Cathal mac Diarmata, 1288–1294
- Maelruanaidh mac Diarmata, 1294–1331.
- Tomaltach gCear mac Diarmata, 1331–1336.
- Conchobhair mac Diarmata, 1336–1343
- Ferghal mac Diarmata, 1343–1368.
- Aedh mac Diarmata, 1368–1393.
- Maelruanaidh mac Diarmata, 1393–1398.
- Conchobair Óg mac Diarmata, 1398–1404.
- Ruaidri Caech mac Diarmata, 1404–1421.
- Tomaltach an Einigh mac Diarmata, 1421–1458.
- Aedh mac Diarmata, 1458–1465.
- Conochobar Óg mac Diarmata, 1456–1478.
- Ruaidri Óg mac Diarmata, 1478–1486.
- Conchobair mac Diarmata, 1486–1497.
- Tadhg mac Diarmata, 1497–1499.
- Cormac mac Diarmata, 1499–1528.
- Dermot an Einigh mac Diarmata, 1528–1533.
- Eoghan mac Diarmata, 1533–1534.
- Aedh na Ab mac Diarmata, 1534–1549.
- Ruaidri mac Diarmata, 1549–1568 - A school invitation was given by Mac Diarmada, i.e. Ruaidhri, at Christmas of this year; and it is not possible to count or over-reckon all that he gave to the poets, and professors, and learned men of Erinn, and to all men besides.
- Turlough mac Diarmata, 1568–1576.
- Tadhg mac Diarmata, 1576–1585, last de facto King of Moylurg.

The MacDermot of the Carrick

- Brian na Carriag MacDermot, 1585–1595, first to be styled "MacDermot of the Carrick"
- Conchobar Óg MacDermot, 1595–1603.
- Brian Óg MacDermot, 1603–1636.

The Chief of the Name

- Turlough MacDermot, 1636 – c.1652, first to be styled Chief of the name.
- Cathal Roe MacDermot, c.1652 – c.1694.
- Hugh MacDermott, c.1694 – 1707.

== See also ==
- Irish royal families
