= McDermid =

McDermid is a Scottish surname, and may refer to:

- Angus McDermid (1920–1988), Welsh broadcaster
- Bob McDermid, Scottish football player.
- Fred McDermid (1924–2011), Scottish politician
- Heather McDermid (born 1968), Canadian rower
- John McDermid (1940–2024), Canadian politician
- John A. McDermid, British computer scientist
- Joseph E. McDermid, American politician
- Norman McDermid (1927–2014), English Anglican priest
- Robert McDermid, Scottish football player
- Sally McDermid (born 1965), Australian softball player.
- Val McDermid (born 1955), Scottish crime writer.
- Wilkes McDermid (died 2015), British food blogger
- William McDermid (1881–1958), New Zealand cricketer

== See also ==
- McDiarmid, an Irish surname
- MacDermot, an Irish Gaelic family
