= Maelruanaidh mac Tadhg =

Fourth king of Moylurg

Maelruanaidh mac Tadhg was the fourth king of Moylurg, and reigned sometime in the late 11th (and possibly into the early 12th) century. The only date associated with his reign, 1080, may simply be provisional.

Preceded by Tadhg mac Muirchertach	King of Moylurg; 1080 – ????	Succeeded by Tadhg Mor mac Maelruanaidh
