= Tadhg Mor mac Maelruanaidh =

Tadhg Mor mac Maelruanaidh was a fifth king of Moylurg.

Tadhg Mor is the first ruler of Moylurg for whom we have definite regnal dates. Compared to his father, grandfather, great-grandfather and great-great-grandfather, he seems to have had a comparatively short reign. However, this may be simply because others names were left out, or a pedigree was mistaken (not for the first time) as a king-list.

Preceded by Maelruanaidh mac Tadhg	King of Moylurg; 1120 – 1124	Succeeded by Maelsechlainn mac Tadhg Mor
