= Fine Gael =

Irish political party

- Leader: Simon Harris
- General Secretary: John Carroll
- Deputy leader: Helen McEntee
- Chairperson: Micheál Carrigy
- Seanad leader: Garret Ahearn
- Founders: W. T. Cosgrave; Eoin O'Duffy; Frank MacDermot; James Dillon
- Founded: 8 September 1933; 93 years ago
- Merger of: Cumann na nGaedheal; Army Comrades Association; National Centre Party
- Headquarters: 51 Mount Street Upper, Dublin, Ireland
- Youth wing: Young Fine Gael
- LGBT wing: Fine Gael LGBT
- Membership (2020): ▼25,000
- Ideology: Liberal conservatism; Christian democracy
- Political position: Centre-right
- European affiliation: European People's Party
- European Parliament group: European People's Party Group
- International affiliation: Centrist Democrat International
- Colours: Dark blue (official); Blue (customary)
- Dáil Éireann: 38 / 174
- Seanad Éireann: 17 / 60
- European Parliament: 4 / 14
- Councillors: 246 / 949

Website
- finegael.ie

Fine Gael (/ˌfiːnə ˈɡeɪl, ˌfɪn-/; Irish: [ˌfʲɪnʲə ˈɡeːl̪ˠ]; lit. 'Family (or Tribe) of the Irish') is a centre-right, liberal-conservative, and Christian democratic political party in Ireland. Fine Gael is currently the third-largest party in the Republic of Ireland in terms of members of Dáil Éireann. The party had a membership of 25,000 in 2021. Simon Harris succeeded Leo Varadkar as party leader on 24 March 2024.

Fine Gael was founded on 8 September 1933, following the merger of its parent party Cumann na nGaedheal, the National Centre Party and the Blueshirts. Its origins lie in the struggle for Irish independence and the pro-Treaty side in the Irish Civil War, with the party claiming the legacy of Michael Collins. In its early years, the party was commonly known as Fine Gael – The United Ireland Party, abbreviated UIP, and its official title in its constitution remains Fine Gael (United Ireland).

Fine Gael holds a pro-European stance and is generally considered to be more of a proponent of economic liberalism than its traditional rival, Fianna Fáil. Fine Gael describes itself as a "party of the progressive centre" which it defines as acting "in a way that is right for Ireland, regardless of dogma or ideology". It lists its core values as "equality of opportunity, free enterprise and reward, security, integrity and hope." In international politics, the party is highly supportive of the European Union, along with generally supporting strengthened relations with the United Kingdom and opposition to physical force Irish republicanism. The party's autonomous youth wing, Young Fine Gael (YFG), was formed in 1977.

Fine Gael governed in coalition with the Labour Party between 2011 and 2016, and in a minority government along with independent TDs from 2016 to 2020. It formed part of a historic coalition government with its traditional rival, Fianna Fáil, and the Green Party, with Simon Harris serving as Taoiseach until January 2025. Since January 2025, Fine Gael has been in a coalition with Fianna Fáil and independents, with Simon Harris serving as Tánaiste.

== History ==
=== Foundation ===
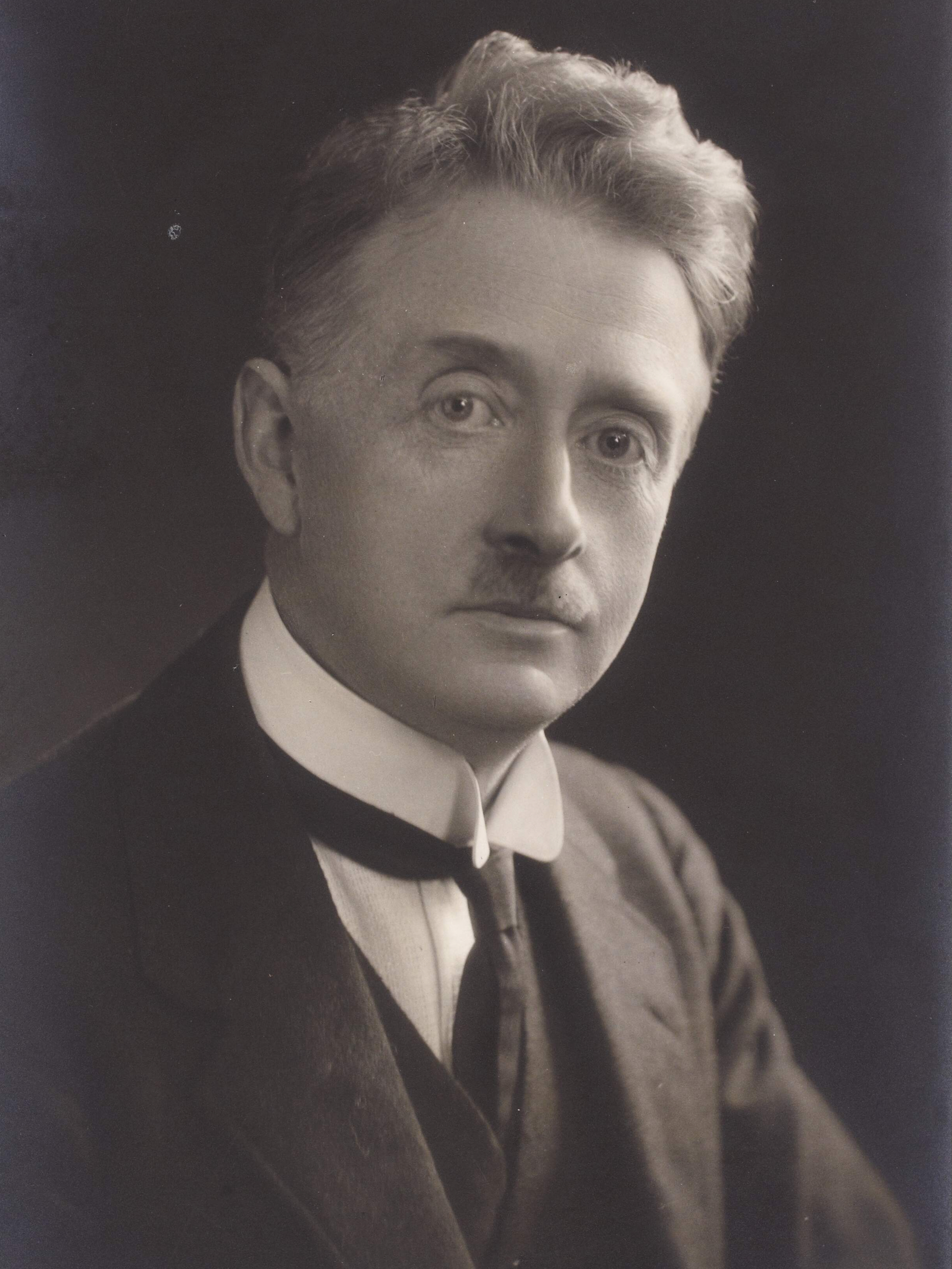
W. T. Cosgrave

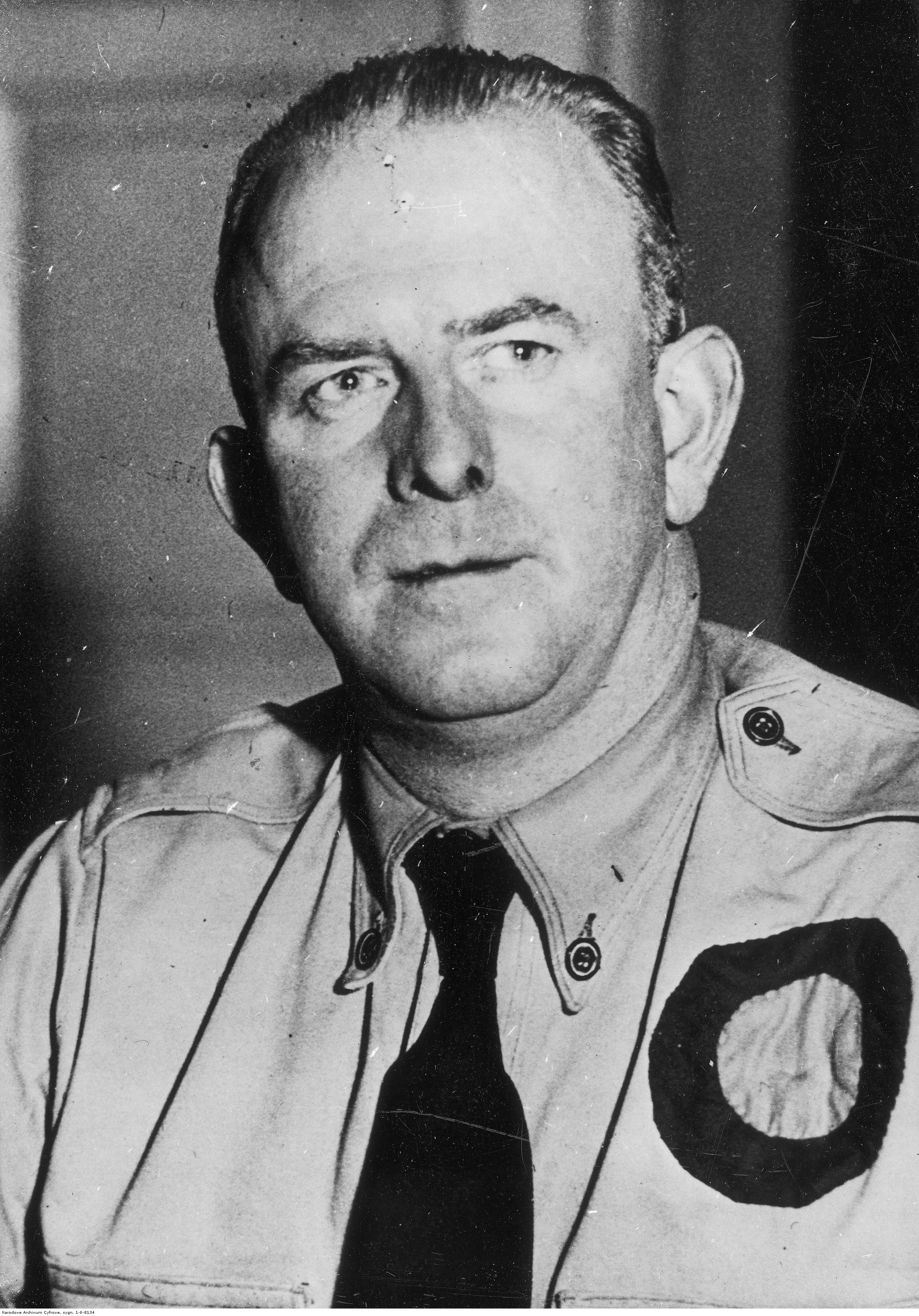
Eoin O'Duffy

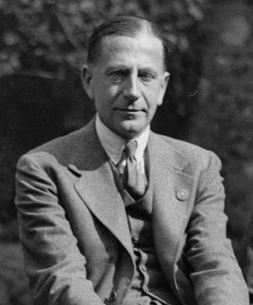
Frank MacDermot

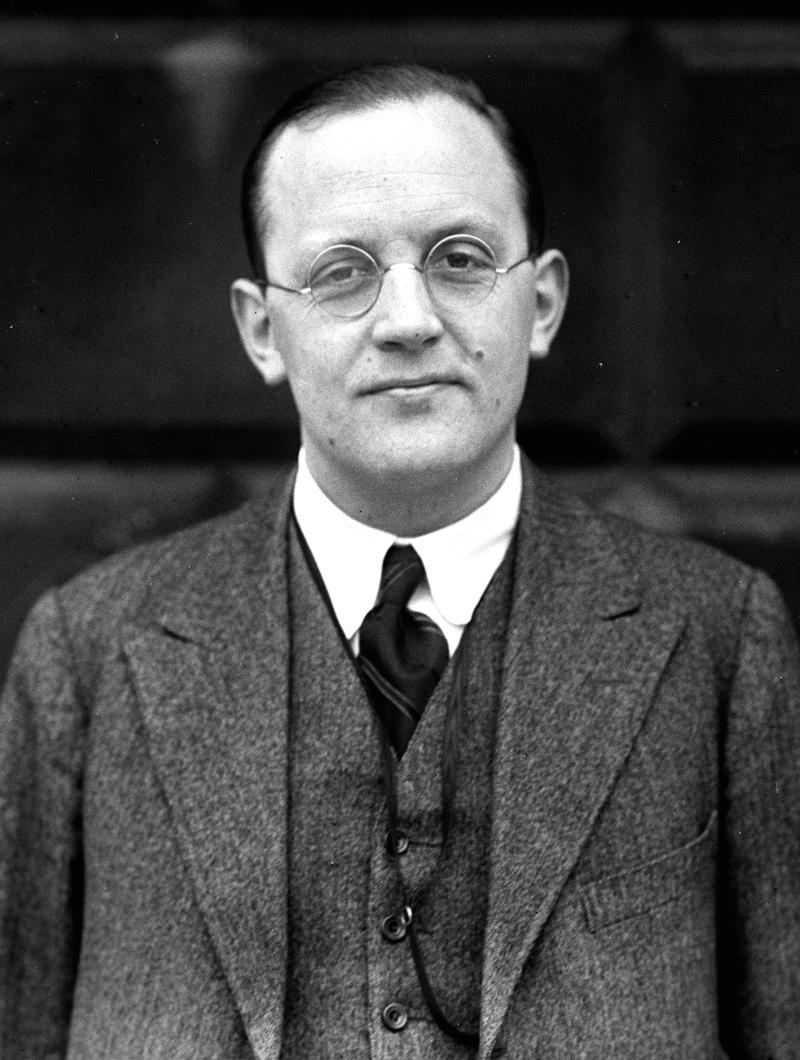
James Dillon

Cosgrave, O'Duffy, MacDermot, and Dillon brought three political groups together to form Fine Gael in 1933
Previous logos of Fine Gael

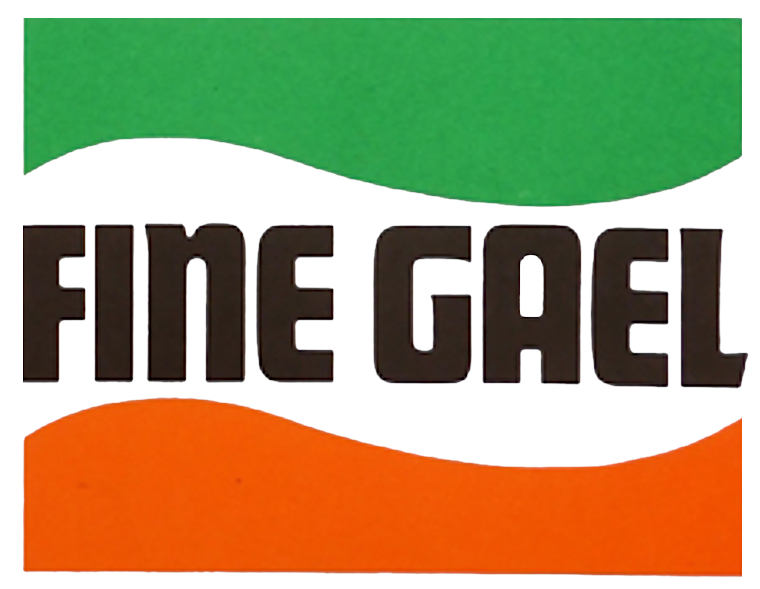
c. 1970s

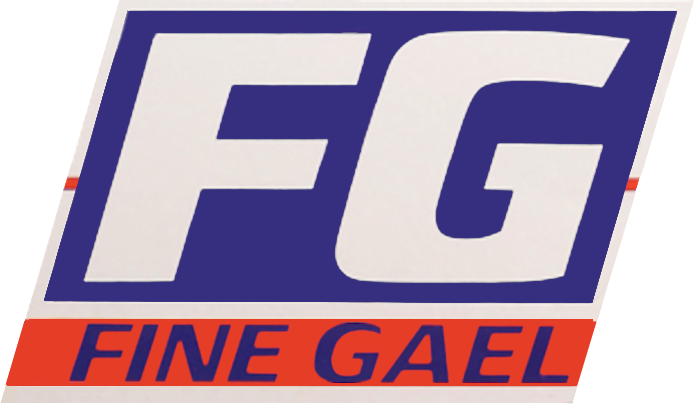
c. 1980s

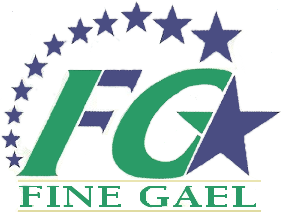
c. 1990s

c. 2009–2026

Fine Gael was created in 1933 following the merger of three political organisations; Cumann na nGaedhael (CnaG) led by W. T. Cosgrave, the National Centre Party led by Frank MacDermot and James Dillon, and the National Guard (better known as the Blueshirts), led by Eoin O'Duffy. Cumann na nGaedhael, born out of the pro-Anglo-Irish Treaty side in the Irish Civil War, had been the party of government from the creation of the Irish Free State in 1922 until the 1932 general election, which it lost to the newly emergent Fianna Fáil. The National Centre Party was a new party that had done well at the 1932 election, and represented the interests of farmers. The National Guard were not a political party, but a militant group made up of former pro-Treaty Irish Army soldiers, and was previously known as the Army Comrades Association. Following the disruption of Cumann na nGaedhael meetings by members of the Irish Republican Army, the ACA had begun providing security at their events. This led to the leadership of the ACA being taken over by a number of CnaG TDs, including Thomas F. O'Higgins. In early 1933, Eoin O'Duffy took over the ACA, renamed them the National Guard, and began instilling the organisation with elements of European fascism. However, in August 1933 the Fianna Fáil government banned the National Guard, fearing a planned parade in Dublin might be an attempt to emulate the March on Rome, which saw Benito Mussolini rise to power in Italy.

In September 1933, the three groups combined forces and merged to form Fine Gael. The National Guard (referred to informally by this point as "the Blueshirts") were to serve as the youth wing of the new party, "The League of Youth". CnaG members dominated the new party. However, to avoid the perception that Fine Gael was simply Cumann na nGaedhael under a new name, O'Duffy was made leader of the new party. Following poor results at the 1934 local elections and concerns over his increasingly rabid rhetoric, O'Duffy resigned from the leadership after the party attempted to control what he said in public. He was replaced by W. T. Cosgrave, with James Dillon becoming deputy leader. O'Duffy attempted to regain control of the Blueshirts, but was rebuffed by the majority of them, who chose to stay with Fine Gael. Under the stewardship of Cosgrave and Dillon, the party returned to the more traditional conservatism espoused by Cumann na nGaedhael, with the moribund League of Youth disbanded by 1936.

=== Finding success with coalitions with Labour ===
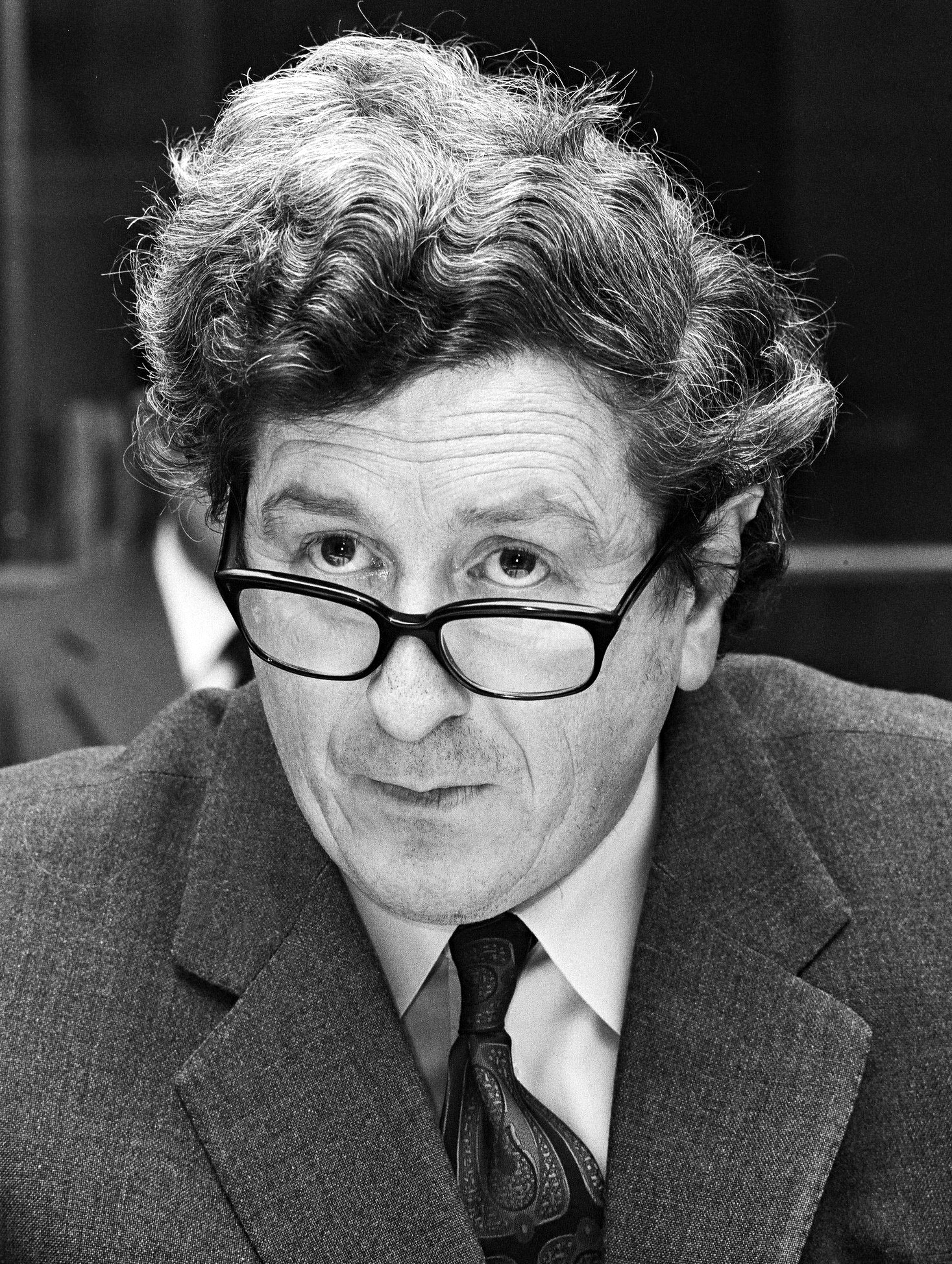
Garret FitzGerald is credited as having had a liberalising effect on the party in the 1980s

Fine Gael remained out of government and at a low ebb for a prolonged period until the aftermath of the 1948 general election, which saw the party form a grand coalition with several other parties in order to oust Fianna Fáil and place Fine Gael member John A. Costello as Taoiseach. The coalition was short-lived but revived again between 1954 and 1957. However, following this stint Fine Gael returned to opposition for 16 years. The party went through a period of soul-searching during the 1960s, in which a new generation of Fine Gael politicians led by Declan Costello sought to revitalise Fine Gael with new ideas. In what has later been hailed as a landmark moment in Fine Gael history, Costello proposed moving the party to the left in a social democratic direction with a document entitled "Towards a Just Society". The document was adopted as the basis for the party's manifesto for the 1965 general election; however, when the party failed to make headway at the polls the momentum behind the Just Society document wilted and faded.

It was not until leader Liam Cosgrave secured an election pact with the Labour Party that Fine Gael returned to government in 1973. This period also saw Fine Gael becoming increasingly liberal in ethos, particularly under the leadership of Garret FitzGerald who took the reins of the party in 1977; It was during this time that Fine Gael campaigned in a number of referendums: the party supported Irish entry into the European Economic Community, supported lowering the voting age from 21 to 18, and supported a proposal to remove the "special position" of the Roman Catholic Church from the constitution. It was on the successful side in all three of these campaigns. The party also began to take a more liberal approach to the introduction of contraceptives to Ireland, although an attempt by the Fine Gael/Labour coalition to legalise contraceptives in 1974 stumbled after six members of Fine Gael, most prominently Taoiseach Liam Cosgrave, voted against the government's own bill.

The arrangement between Fine Gael and Labour proved pleasing to both parties and their election pacts remained throughout the rest of the 1970s and into the 1980s, seeing the pair enter government a number of times together. In 1985, Fine Gael/Labour voted to liberalise access to contraceptives. That same year FitzGerald signed the Anglo-Irish Agreement with Margaret Thatcher, paving the way to devolved government in Northern Ireland. In 1986 the party campaigned for a Yes in that year's referendum on legalising divorce, which was defeated, with the No side obtaining 63.5% of the vote.

=== Decline and rebuilding ===
The 1980s had proven fruitful electorally for Fine Gael, but the 1990s and early 2000s saw this momentum decline quickly. One of the first signs of this was the party's poor result in the 1990 presidential election, in which their candidate Austin Currie obtained just 17% of the first preference vote.

Fine Gael formed a government between 1994 and 1997 with the Labour Party and the Democratic Left. This government legalised divorce after a successful referendum in 1995. The party's share of TDs fell from 54 in 1997 to only 31 in the 2002 general election, its second-worst result ever at that point. It was at this point Enda Kenny took over leadership of the party and began the process of rebuilding it. At the 2007 general election Kenny was able to bring Fine Gael back to its 1997 levels with 51 TDs.

=== Recovery ===
The collapse of the Celtic Tiger resulted in the post-2008 Irish economic downturn, which threw Ireland not only into economic turmoil but also political upheaval. The 2011 Irish general election saw the governing Fianna Fáil collapse at the polls, while Fine Gael and the Labour Party returned with their best results ever. For the first time in its history, Fine Gael became the largest party in Dáil Eireann. Once more Fine Gael and Labour paired up to form a government, their tenure marked by the difficulty of trying to guide Ireland towards economic recovery. In 2013, a number of Fine Gael parliamentary party members, including Lucinda Creighton, were expelled from the party for defying the party whip on anti-abortion grounds to oppose the Protection of Life During Pregnancy Bill. These members subsequently formed a political party called Renua.

=== Since 2015 ===
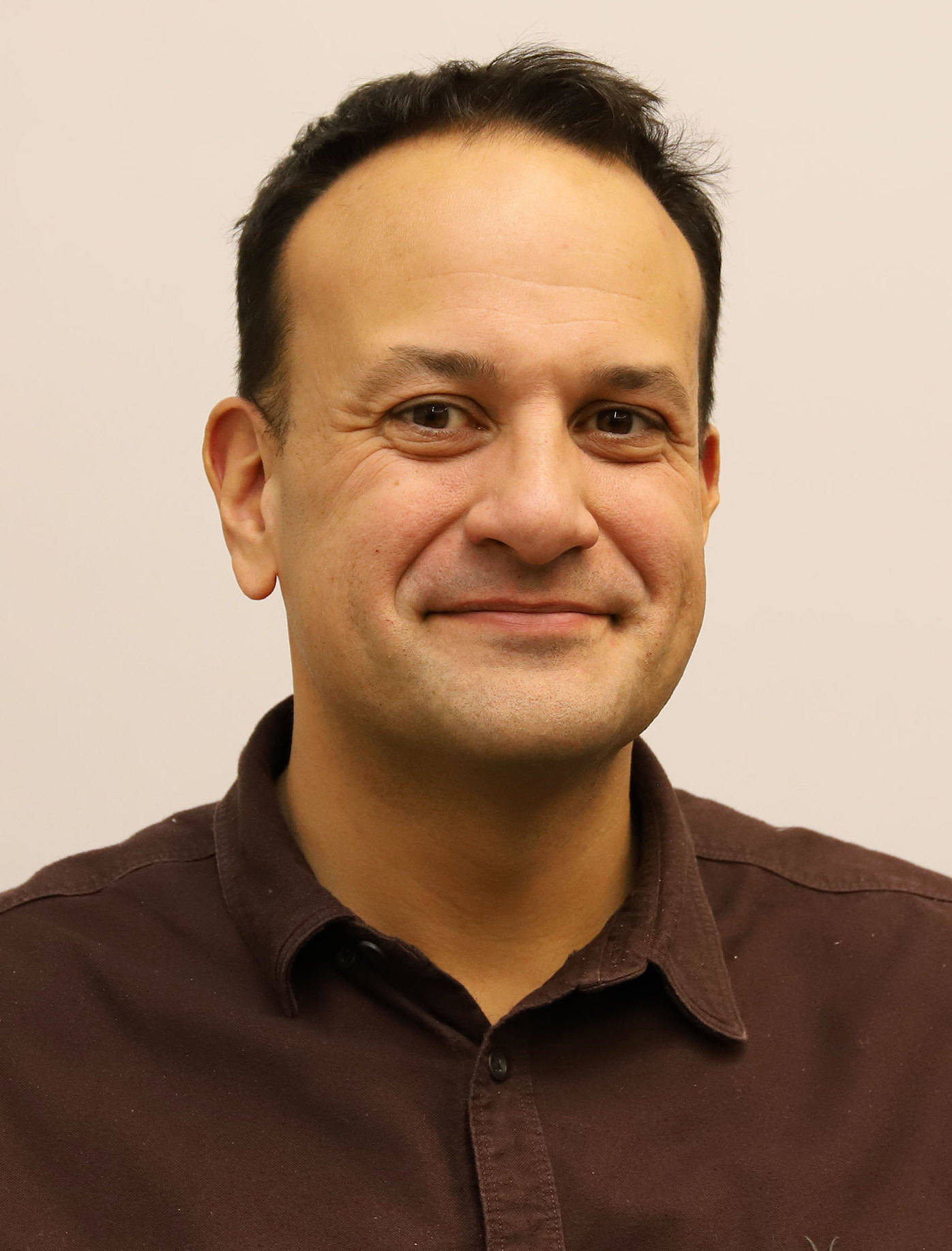
Leo Varadkar, Leader of Fine Gael from 2017 to 2024

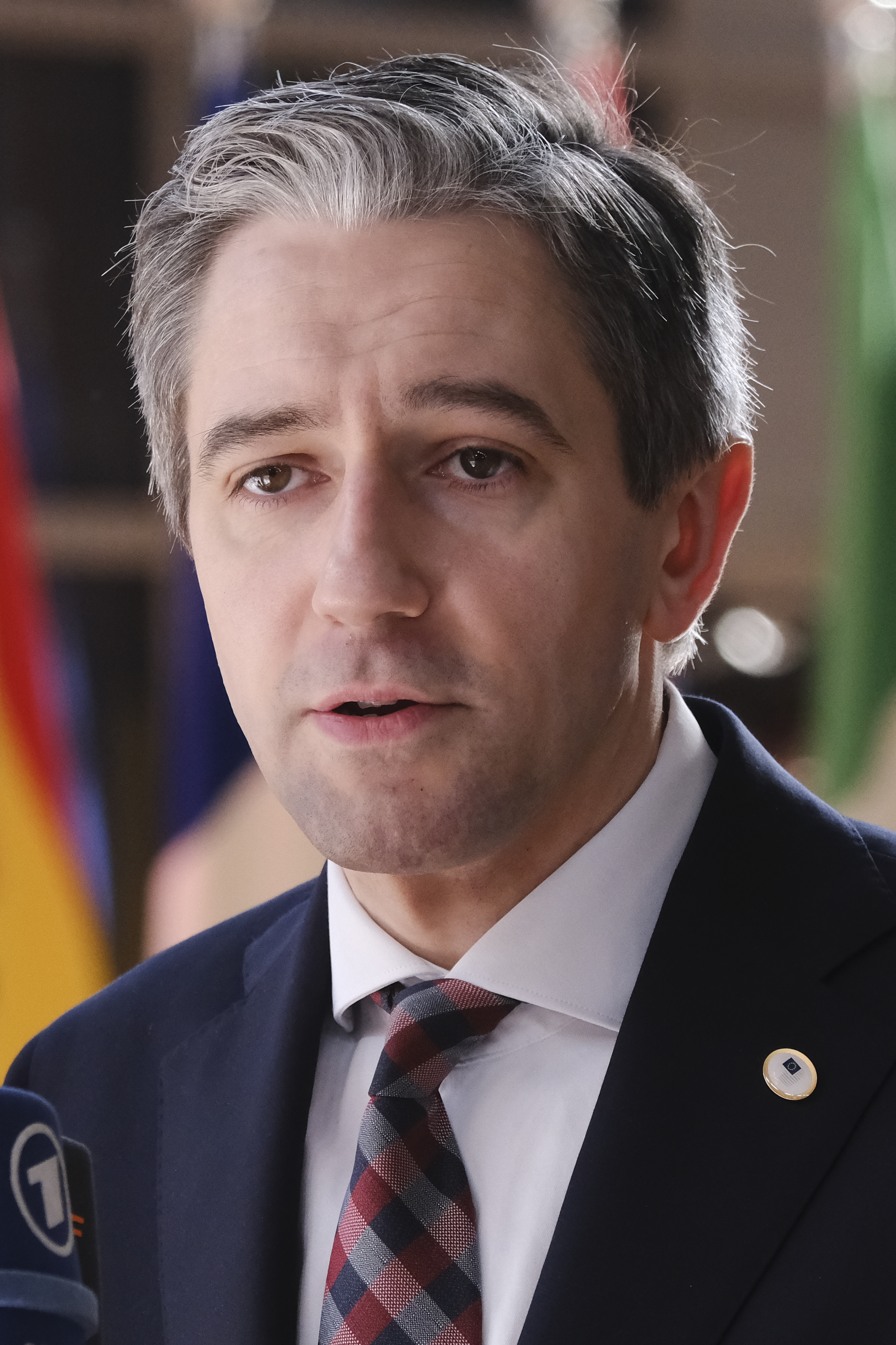
Simon Harris, current Leader of Fine Gael

In 2015, the Fine Gael/Labour government held a referendum to allow gay marriage under the constitution. The government campaigned for a yes vote and were successful. Following the 2016 general election, Fine Gael retained control of the government as a minority government, made possible by a confidence and supply agreement with Fianna Fáíl, who agreed to abstain in confidence votes. Enda Kenny resigned as party leader in 2017. Following a leadership contest, Leo Varadkar became his successor as well as Taoiseach. In doing so, Varadkar became one of the first openly LGBT heads of government in the world. In 2018 the Fine Gael government held a referendum on the Eighth Amendment, the provision in the Irish constitution which forbid abortion. The party campaigned to repeal the amendment and was successful.

After the 2020 general election, for the first time in history, Fine Gael entered into a coalition government with its traditional rival Fianna Fáil, as well as the Green Party, with Leo Varadkar serving as Tánaiste for the first half of the government's five-year term, then becoming Taoiseach in December 2022. Leo Varadkar resigned as leader of Fine Gael on 20 March 2024, and was succeeded by Simon Harris, who was elected unopposed on 24 March.

== Ideology and policies ==
As a political party of the centre or centre-right, Fine Gael has been described as liberal-conservative, Christian democratic, liberal, conservative liberal, conservative, and pro-European, with an ideological base combining elements of cultural conservatism and economic liberalism.

Although Ireland's political spectrum was traditionally divided along Civil War lines, rather than the traditional European left–right spectrum, Fine Gael is described generally as a centre-right party, with a focus on "fiscal rectitude". As the descendant of the pro-Treaty factions in the Irish Civil War, Fine Gael cites Michael Collins as an inspiration and claims his legacy. He remains a symbol for the party, and the anniversary of his death is commemorated each year in August.

Although Fine Gael was historically a Catholic party, it became the de facto home for Irish Protestants. Its membership base had a higher proportion of Protestants than that of Fianna Fáil or Labour. The party promoted a strong Catholic image and depicted itself as a defender of Catholicism against Atheistic Communism, of which it accused the two aforementioned parties of being sympathetic to.

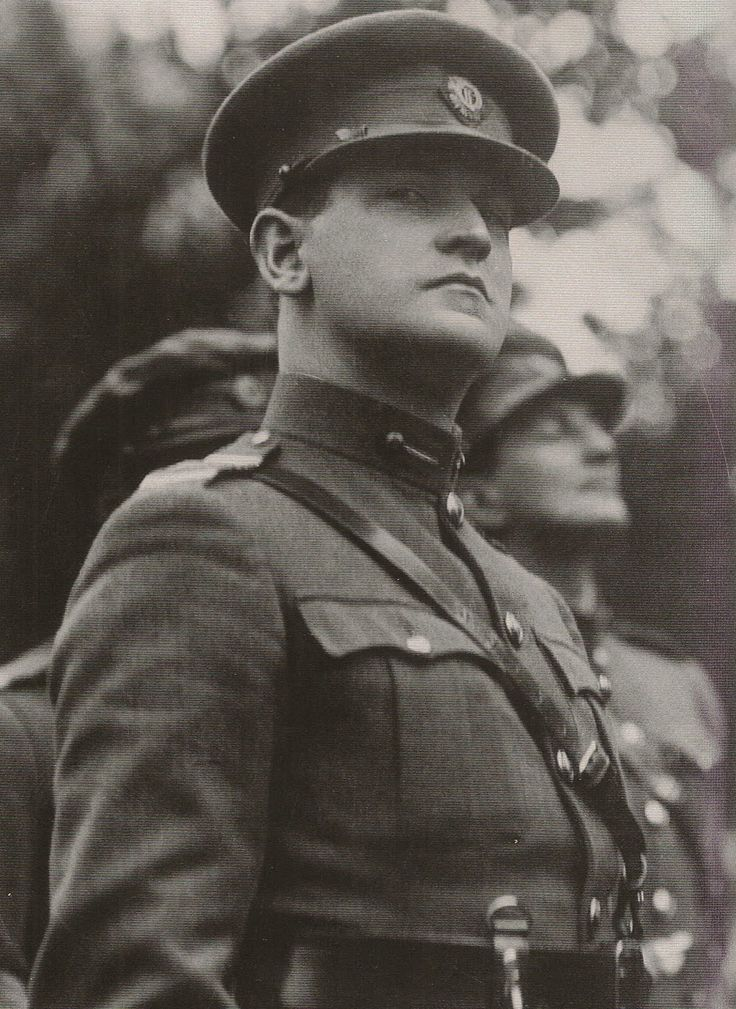
Through their Cumann na nGaedhael and Pro-Treaty lineage, Fine Gael claim the legacy of Michael Collins, whom they use as a symbol to bolster their law-and-order image

=== Social policies ===
Fine Gael adopted the "Just Society" policy statement in the 1960s, based on principles of social justice and equality. It was created by the emerging social democratic wing of the party, led by Declan Costello. The ideas expressed in the policy statement had a significant influence on the party in the years to come.

While Fine Gael was traditionally socially conservative for most of the twentieth century due to the conservative Christian ethos of Irish society during this time, its members are variously influenced by social liberalism, social democracy and Christian democracy on issues of social policy. Under Garret FitzGerald, the party's more socially liberal, or pluralist, wing gained prominence. Proposals to allow divorce were put to referendum by two Fine Gael–led governments, in 1986 under FitzGerald, and in 1995 under John Bruton, passing very narrowly on this second attempt. Its modern supporters have shown a preference for postmaterialist values.

==== LGBT+ issues ====
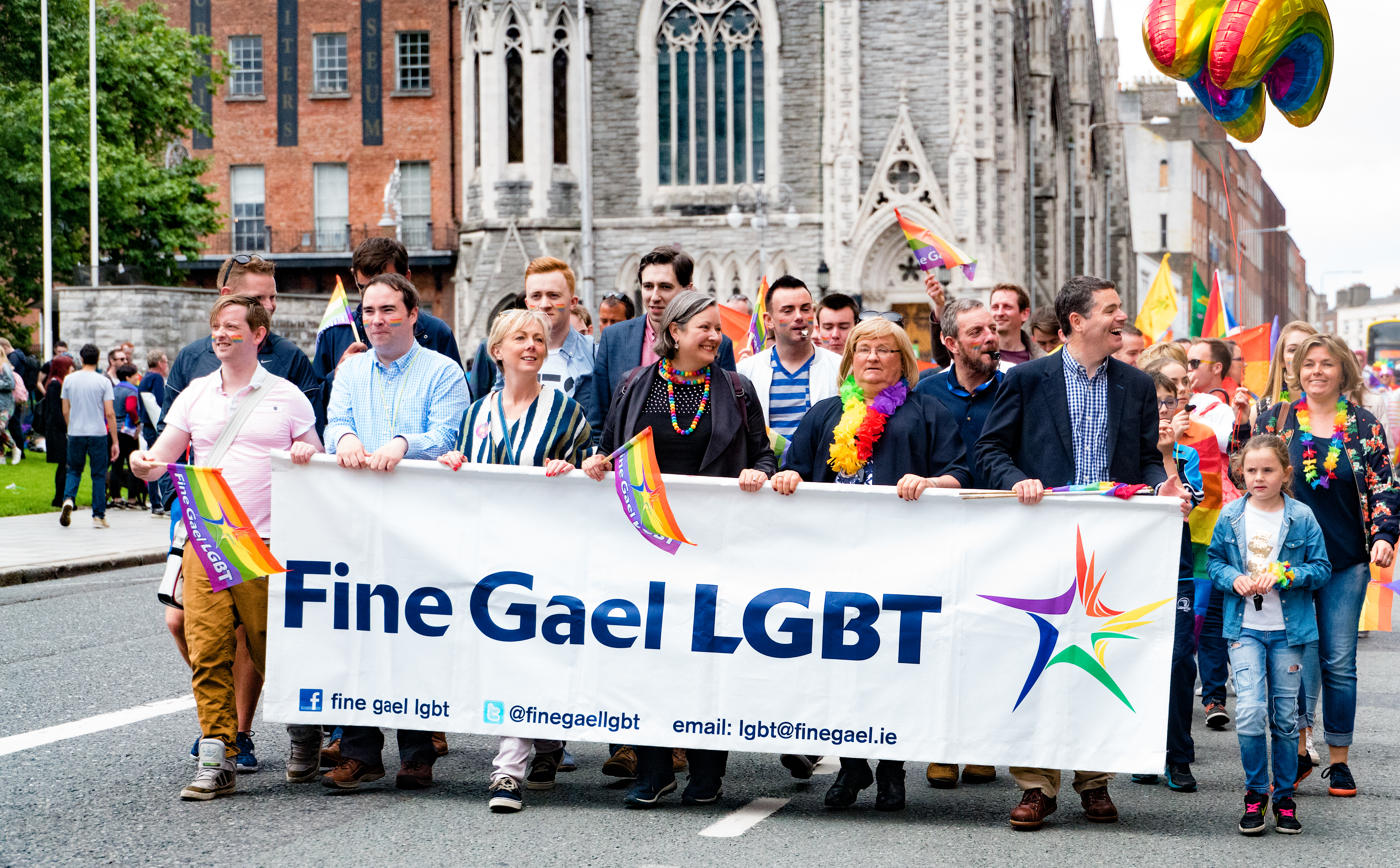
Members of Fine Gael participating in the 2016 Dublin Pride parade

Fine Gael supported civil unions for same-sex couples from 2003, voting for the Civil Partnership and Certain Rights and Obligations of Cohabitants Bill 2010. In 2012, the party approved a motion at its Ardfheis to prioritise the consideration of same-sex marriage in the upcoming constitutional convention. In 2013, party leader and Taoiseach Enda Kenny declared his support for same-sex marriage. The Fine Gael–led government held a referendum on the subject on 22 May 2015. The referendum passed, with the electorate voting to extend full marriage rights to same-sex couples, with 62.1% in favour and 37.9% opposed.

In 2015, months before the marriage equality referendum, Leo Varadkar became the first Irish government minister to come out as gay. In May 2019, former Rose of Tralee Maria Walsh, was elected as a Fine Gael MEP for the Midlands-Northwest constituency in the 2019 European Parliament election, running alongside Mairéad McGuinness MEP. Walsh was Fine Gael's first openly lesbian candidate.

Fine Gael has an LGBT+ section, Fine Gael LGBT, and in 2017, Leo Varadkar became the first Taoiseach to march in Dublin Pride.

==== Abortion ====
In 1983, the Eighth Amendment to the Constitution, which proposed to protect the life of the unborn, was put to a referendum. Fine Gael initially supported the proposal, but then came out in opposition to it. Under leader and Taoiseach Garret FitzGerald, the party campaigned for a 'No' vote, arguing, on the advice of the Attorney General Peter Sutherland, that the wording, which had been drafted under the previous government, was ambiguous and open to many interpretations. Its stance conflicted with that of the Pro-Life Amendment Campaign (PLAC) and Catholic bishops, and Fianna Fáil, the largest party in the State at the time, but then in opposition. The amendment resulted in the addition of Article 40.3.3° to the Constitution, giving the unborn child a qualified equal right to life to that of the mother.

In 1992, in the X Case, the Supreme Court held that a risk to the life of woman from suicide was a permissible ground under Article 40.3.3° for abortion. In 2002, Fine Gael campaigned against the Twenty-fifth Amendment to the Constitution, which proposed to remove suicide as a grounds for granting a termination of a pregnancy. The amendment was rejected by Irish voters.

In 2013 it proposed, and supported, the enactment of the Protection of Life During Pregnancy Act 2013, which implemented in statute law the X case ruling of the Supreme Court, granting access to a termination of a pregnancy where there is a real and substantial risk to the life, not the health, of the mother, including a threat of suicide. Five TDs and two Senators, including Minister of State Lucinda Creighton, lost the Fine Gael party whip for voting against the legislation. Creighton later left Fine Gael to found Renua. The Act was criticised by various anti-abortion groups and Catholic bishops, but supported by a majority of the electorate in opinion polls, with many indicating they wished to see a more liberal law on abortion.

Enda Kenny's Fine Gael–led minority government took office after the 2016 election with a programme which promised a randomly selected Citizens' Assembly to report on possible changes to the Eighth Amendment, which would be considered by an Oireachtas committee, to whose report the government would respond officially in debates in both houses of the Oireachtas. Fine Gael Oireachtas members were promised a free vote on the issue. Leo Varadkar succeeded Enda Kenny as Taoiseach on 14 June 2017 and promised to hold a referendum on abortion in 2018. Several Fine Gael TDs, notably Health Minister Simon Harris and Kate O'Connell, were prominent supporters of the pro-choice side before and during the referendum. While the party was divided, the majority of Fine Gael TDs and Senators, as well as most members, were in favour of repealing the Eighth Amendment. A referendum to repeal the Eighth Amendment was held on 25 May 2018 and was approved by 66.4% of voters.

==== Drug policies ====
The party has traditionally held a strong stance against the decriminalisation of drugs. In 2007, Fine Gael's leader at the time Enda Kenny called for drug and alcohol testing to be performed in schools, saying cocaine usage at schools was "rampant" in some areas.

At the party's 2014 Ard Fheis, a proposed motion to support the legalisation of cannabis was voted down by the membership.

In 2016, the Fine Gael health minister James Reilly said that they would not be changing their policy on the legalisation of cannabis, due to "serious concerns about the health impacts" of cannabis.

=== Economic policies ===
Fine Gael has, since its inception, portrayed itself as a party of fiscal rectitude and minimal government interference in economics, advocating pro-enterprise policies. In that they followed the line of the previous pro-Treaty government that believed in minimal state intervention, low taxes and social expenditures. Newly elected politicians for the party in the Dáil have strongly advocated liberal economic policies. Lucinda Creighton (who has since left the party) and Leo Varadkar in particular have been seen as strong advocates of a neoliberal approach to Ireland's economic woes and unemployment problems. Varadkar in particular has been a strong proponent of small, indigenous business, advocating in 2008 that smaller firms should have benefitted from the government's recapitalisation program. Its former finance spokesman Richard Bruton's proposals were seen as approaching problems from a pro-enterprise point of view. Its fairer budget website in 2011 suggested that its solutions are "tough but fair". Other solutions conform generally to conservative governments' policies throughout Europe, focusing on cutting numbers in the public sector, while maintaining investment in infrastructure.

Fine Gael's proposals have sometimes been criticised mostly by smaller political groupings in Ireland, and by some of the trade unions, who have raised the idea that the party's solutions are more conscious of business interests than the interests of the worker. In 2008 the SIPTU trade union stated its opposition to then-Taoiseach Enda Kenny's assertion, in response to Ireland's economic crisis, that the national wage agreement ought to have been suspended. Kenny's comments had support however and the party attributed its significant rise in polls in 2008 to this.

Fine Gael's Simon Coveney launched what the party termed a radical re-organisation of the Irish semi-state company sector. Styled the New Economy and Recovery Authority (or NewERA), Coveney said that it is an economic stimulus plan that will "reshape the Irish economy for the challenges of the 21st century". Requiring an €18.2 billion investment in Energy, Communications and Water infrastructure over a four-year period, it was promoted as a way to enhance energy security and the digital reputation of Ireland. A very broad-ranging document, it proposed the combined management of a portfolio of semi-state assets, and the sale of all other, non-essential services. The release of equity through the sale of the various state resources, including electricity generation services belonging to the ESB, Bord na Móna and Bord Gáis, in combination with use of money in the National Pensions Reserve Fund, was Fine Gael's proposed funding source for its national stimulus package.

The plan was seen as the longer term contribution to Fine Gael's economic agenda and the basis of its program for government. It was publicised in combination with a more short term policy proposal from Leo Varadkar. This document, termed "Hope for a Lost Generation", promised to bring 30,000 young Irish people off the Live Register in a year by combining a National Internship Program, a Second Chance Education Scheme, an Apprenticeship Guarantee and Community Work Program, as well as instituting a German style Workshare program.

=== Constitutional reform policies ===
In 2010, Fine Gael's Phil Hogan published the party's proposals for political and constitutional reform. In a policy document entitled New Politics, Hogan suggested creating a country with "a smaller, more dynamic and more responsive political system" by reducing the size of the Dáil by 20, changing the way the Dáil works, and by abolishing the Irish senate, Seanad Éireann.

The question of whether to abolish the Seanad or not was put to a referendum in 2013, with voters voting 51% to 49% to retain bicameralism in Ireland.

In 2022, Fine Gael Spokesperson on European Affairs, Neale Richmond, said the debate on Irish unity must transition from aspirational to achievable. Young Fine Gael members are reportedly supportive of a United Ireland. In 2024, Simon Harris said his party's aspires a united Ireland but it is not a priority for him.

=== Health policies ===
The Irish health system, being administered centrally by the Health Service Executive, is seen to be poor by comparison to other countries in Europe, ranking outside expected levels at 25th according to the Euro Health Consumer Index 2006.

Fine Gael has long wanted Ireland to break with the system of private health insurance, public medical cards and what it calls the two tiers of the health system and has launched a campaign to see the system reformed. Speaking in favour of the campaign, Fine Gael then health spokesman James Reilly stated "Over the last 10 years the health service has become a shambles. We regularly have over 350 people on trolleys in A&E, waiting lists that go on for months, outpatient waiting lists that go on for years and cancelled operations across the country..."

Fine Gael launched its FairCare campaign and website in April 2009, which stated that the health service would be reformed away from a costly ineffective endeavour, into a publicly regulated system where compulsory universal health insurance would replace the existing provisions.

This strategy was criticised by Fianna Fáil's then-Minister for Children, Barry Andrews. The spokesperson for family law and children, Alan Shatter TD, robustly defended its proposals as the only means of reducing public expenditure, and providing a service in Ireland more akin to the Canadian, German, Dutch and Austrian health systems.

Fine Gael's current healthcare policy revolves around the implementation of Sláintecare, a cross-party plan for the reform of the Irish health system. Sláintecare is focused on introducing "a universal single-tiered health service, which guarantees access based on need, not income… through Universal Health Insurance".

=== Pro-Europeanism and defence policies ===
Fine Gael is among the most pro-European integration parties in Ireland, having supported the European Constitution, the Lisbon Treaty, and advocating participation in European common defence. The party have been supportive of NATO. In 1998, party leader John Bruton called on Ireland to join the NATO-led Partnership for Peace. The party's youth wing, Young Fine Gael, passed a motion in 2016 calling on the government to apply for membership of NATO.

Under Enda Kenny, the party called on the state to end Irish neutrality and to sign up for a European defence structure, with Kenny claiming that "the truth is, Ireland is not neutral. We are merely unaligned." Following the 2022 Russian invasion of Ukraine, Fine Gael called for an increase in defence spending, with Minister for Foreign Affairs Simon Coveney proposing an increase of €500 million a year and suggesting Ireland needed a "fundamental rethink" of its security approach.

Since Brexit, Fine Gael has taken a strong pro-European stance, stating that Ireland's place is "at the heart of Europe". In government, the party has launched the "Global Ireland" plan to develop alliances with other small countries across Europe and the world.

== European affiliations ==
Fine Gael is a founding member of the European People's Party (EPP), the largest European political party comprising liberal conservative and Christian democratic national-level parties from across Europe. Fine Gael's MEPs sit with the EPP Group in the European Parliament, and Fine Gael parliamentarians also sit with the EPP Groups in the Parliamentary Assembly of the Council of Europe and Committee of the Regions. Young Fine Gael is a member of the Youth of the European People's Party (YEPP).

It is inferred from the party's relationship with its European counterparts via membership of the European People's Party that Fine Gael belongs on the centre-right. The party conforms generally with European political parties that identify themselves as being Christian democratic.

== Planning and payment tribunals ==
The Moriarty Tribunal has sat since 1997 and has investigated the granting of a mobile phone license to Esat Telecom by Michael Lowry when he was Fine Gael Minister for Transport, Energy and Communications in the Rainbow Coalition of the mid-1990s. Lowry resigned from the Cabinet after it was revealed at the Moriarty Tribunal that businessman Ben Dunne had paid for an IR£395,000 extension to Lowry's County Tipperary home. Lowry, now an independent TD, supported the Fianna Fáil–Green Party government in Dáil Éireann until March 2011.

It was also revealed in December 1996 that Fine Gael had received some £180,000 from Ben Dunne in the period 1987 to 1993. This was composed of £100,000 in 1993, £50,000 in 1992 and £30,000 in 1989. In addition, Michael Noonan received £3,000 in 1992 towards his election campaign, Ivan Yates received £5,000, Michael Lowry received £5,000 and Sean Barrett received £1,000 in the earlier 1987 election. John Bruton said he had received £1,000 from Dunne in 1982 towards his election campaign, and Dunne had also given £15,000 to the Labour Party during the 1990 Presidential election campaign.

Following revelations at the Moriarty Tribunal on 16 February 1999, in relation to Charles Haughey and his relationship with AIB, former Taoiseach Garret Fitzgerald confirmed that AIB and Ansbacher wrote off debts of almost £200,000 that he owed in 1993, when he was in financial difficulties because of the collapse of the aircraft leasing company, GPA, in which he was a shareholder. The write-off occurred after Fitzgerald left politics. Fitzgerald also said he believed his then Fine Gael colleague, Peter Sutherland, who was chairman of AIB at the time, was unaware of the situation.

== Leadership ==
The leader of the Fine Gael party is Simon Harris. The position of deputy leader has been held since 2024 by Helen McEntee TD, the Minister for Education and Skills.

=== Party leader ===
The following are the terms of office as party leader, and as Taoiseach (bolded) if applicable:

Leader	Portrait	Period	Constituency	Periods in office (Taoiseach unless otherwise noted)
Eoin O'Duffy		1933–1934	Monaghan (Note: O'Duffy did not hold a seat in the Oireachtas while he was party leader.)	
W. T. Cosgrave		1934–1944	Carlow–Kilkenny	President of the Executive Council (for Cumann na nGaedheal) 1922–1932 (1st, 2nd, 3rd, 4th and 5th Executive Council of the Irish Free State)
Richard Mulcahy		1944–1959 (Note: While Mulcahy was a member of the Seanad in 1944, Tom O'Higgins acted as parliamentary party leader. Between 1948 and 1959, John A. Costello served as parliamentary leader.)	Tipperary	**John A. Costello** as Taoiseach (Note: While Mulcahy was party leader, Costello was Taoiseach on two occasions.) 1948–1951; 1954–1957 (5th and 7th Government of Ireland)
James Dillon		1959–1965	Monaghan	
**Liam Cosgrave**		1965–1977	Dún Laoghaire	1973–1977 (14th Government of Ireland)
**Garret FitzGerald**		1977–1987	Dublin South-East	1981 – Feb 1982; Nov 1982–1987 (17th and 19th Government of Ireland)
Alan Dukes		1987–1990	Kildare South	
**John Bruton**		1990–2001	Meath	1994–1997 (24th Government of Ireland)
Michael Noonan		2001–2002	Limerick East	
**Enda Kenny**		2002–2017	Mayo	2011–2017 (29th and 30th Government of Ireland)
**Leo Varadkar**		2017–2024	Dublin West	2017–2020; as Tánaiste 2020–2022 (31st, 32nd and 33rd Government of Ireland)
**Simon Harris**		2024–present	Wicklow	2024–2025; as Tánaiste 2025–present (34th and 35th Government of Ireland)

=== Deputy leader ===
Name	Period	Constituency
Tom O'Higgins	1972–1977	Dublin County South
Peter Barry	1977–1987	Cork South-Central
John Bruton	1987–1990	Meath
Peter Barry	1991–1993	Cork South-Central
Nora Owen	1993–2001	Dublin North
Jim Mitchell	2001–2002	Dublin Central
Richard Bruton	2002–2010	Dublin North-Central
James Reilly	2010–2017	Dublin North
Simon Coveney	2017–2024	Cork South-Central
Heather Humphreys	Apr.–Oct. 2024	Cavan–Monaghan
Helen McEntee	2024–present	Meath East

=== Seanad leader ===
Name	Period	Panel
Michael J. O'Higgins	1973–1977	Nominated member of Seanad Éireann
Patrick Cooney	1977–1981	Cultural and Educational Panel
Gemma Hussey	1981–1982	National University of Ireland
James Dooge	1982–1987	National University of Ireland
Maurice Manning	1987–2002	Cultural and Educational Panel
Brian Hayes	2002–2007	Cultural and Educational Panel
Michael Finucane	2007 (acting)	Labour Panel
Frances Fitzgerald	2007–2011	Labour Panel
Maurice Cummins	2011–2016	Labour Panel
Jerry Buttimer	2016–2020	Labour Panel
Regina Doherty	2020–2024	Nominated member of Seanad Éireann
Seán Kyne	2024–2026	Cultural and Educational Panel
Garret Ahearn	2026–present	Administrative Panel

== Election results ==
=== Dáil Éireann ===
Election	Leader	FPv	%	Seats	%	±	Dáil	Government
1937	W. T. Cosgrave	461,171	34.8 (#2)	48 / 138	34.8 (#2)	▼11 (Note: The total number of Fine Gael TDs is compared to the combined total won by Cumann na nGaedheal and the National Centre Party at the previous general election.)	9th	Opposition; 8th executive, 1st government (FF minority)
1938	W. T. Cosgrave	428,633	33.3 (#2)	45 / 138	32.6 (#2)	▼3	10th	Opposition; 2nd government (FF majority)
1943	W. T. Cosgrave	307,490	23.1 (#2)	32 / 138	23.2 (#2)	▼12	11th	Opposition; 3rd government (FF minority)
1944	Richard Mulcahy	249,329	20.5 (#2)	30 / 138	21.7 (#2)	▼2	12th	Opposition; 4th government (FF majority)
1948	Richard Mulcahy	262,393	19.8 (#2)	31 / 147	21.1 (#2)	▲1	13th	Government; 5th government (FG-Lab-CnP-CnT- NL-MR-Ind majority)
1951	Richard Mulcahy	349,922	25.8 (#2)	40 / 147	27.2 (#2)	▲9	14th	Opposition; 6th government (FF minority)
1954	Richard Mulcahy	427,031	32.0 (#2)	50 / 147	34.0 (#2)	▲10	15th	Government; 7th government (FG-Lab-CnT minority)
1957	Richard Mulcahy	326,699	26.6 (#2)	40 / 147	27.2 (#2)	▼10	16th	Opposition; 8th, 9th government (FF majority)
1961	James Dillon	374,099	32.0 (#2)	47 / 144	32.6 (#2)	▲7	17th	Opposition; 10th government (FF minority)
1965	James Dillon	427,081	34.1 (#2)	47 / 144	32.6 (#2)	Steady	18th	Opposition; 11th, 12th government (FF majority)
1969	Liam Cosgrave	449,749	34.1 (#2)	50 / 144	34.7 (#2)	▲3	19th	Opposition; 13th government (FF majority)
1973	Liam Cosgrave	473,781	35.1 (#2)	54 / 144	37.5 (#2)	▲4	20th	Government; 14th government (FG-Lab majority)
1977	Liam Cosgrave	488,767	30.5 (#2)	43 / 148	29.1 (#2)	▼11	21st	Opposition; 15th, 16th government (FF majority)
1981	Garret FitzGerald	626,376	36.5 (#2)	65 / 166	39.2 (#2)	▲22	22nd	Government; 17th government (FG-Lab minority)
Feb. 1982	Garret FitzGerald	621,088	37.3 (#2)	63 / 166	38.0 (#2)	▼2	23rd	Opposition; 18th government (FF minority)
Nov. 1982	Garret FitzGerald	662,284	39.2 (#2)	70 / 166	42.2 (#2)	▲7	24th	Government; 19th government (FG-Lab majority)
1987	Garret FitzGerald	481,127	27.1 (#2)	51 / 166	30.7 (#2)	▼19	25th	Opposition; 20th government (FF minority)
1989	Alan Dukes	485,307	29.3 (#2)	55 / 166	33.1 (#2)	▲4	26th	Opposition; 21st, 22nd government (FF-PD majority)
1992	John Bruton	422,106	24.5 (#2)	45 / 166	27.1 (#2)	▼10	27th	Opposition; 23rd government (FF-Lab majority)
1992	John Bruton	422,106	24.5 (#2)	45 / 166	27.1 (#2)	▼10	27th	Government; 24th government (FG-Lab-DL majority)
1997	John Bruton	499,936	27.9 (#2)	54 / 166	32.5 (#2)	▲9	28th	Opposition; 25th government (FF-PD minority)
2002	Michael Noonan	417,619	22.5 (#2)	31 / 166	18.7 (#2)	▼23	29th	Opposition; 26th government (FF-PD majority)
2007	Enda Kenny	564,428	27.3 (#2)	51 / 166	30.7 (#2)	▲20	30th	Opposition; 27th, 28th government (FF-GP-PD/Ind majority)
2011	Enda Kenny	801,628	36.1 (#1)	76 / 166	45.8 (#1)	▲25	31st	Government; 29th government (FG-Lab majority)
2016	Enda Kenny	544,410	25.5 (#1)	50 / 158	31.7 (#1)	▼26	32nd	Government; 30th, 31st government (FG-Ind minority)
2020	Leo Varadkar	455,568	20.9 (#3)	35 / 160	21.9 (#3)	▼15	33rd	Government; 32nd, 33rd, 34th government (FF-FG-GP majority)
2024	Simon Harris	458,134	20.8 (#2)	38 / 174	21.8 (#3)	▲3	34th	Government; 35th government (FF-FG-Ind majority)

=== Presidential elections ===
Election	Nominee	Party	Alliance	1st	Final
1938	Douglas Hyde	IND	Fianna Fáil; Labour	Unopposed	
1945	Seán Mac Eoin	FG	—N/a	30.9%	45.5%
1952	—N/a				
1959	Seán Mac Eoin	FG	—N/a	43.7%	—N/a
1966	Tom O'Higgins	FG	—N/a	49.5%	—N/a
1973	Tom O'Higgins	FG	—N/a	48.0%	—N/a
1974	—N/a				
1976	—N/a				
1983	—N/a				
1990	Austin Currie	FG	—N/a	17.0%	—N/a
1997	Mary Banotti	FG	—N/a	29.3%	39.2%
2004	Mary McAleese	IND	List: Fianna Fáil; Labour; Progressive Democrats; Green; Sinn Féin	Unopposed	
2011	Gay Mitchell	FG	—N/a	6.4%	—N/a
2018	Michael D. Higgins	IND	List: Fianna Fáil; Labour; Social Democrats; Green	55.8%	—N/a
2025	Heather Humphreys	FG	—N/a	29.5%	—N/a

=== European Parliament ===
Election	Leader	FPv	%	Seats	%	+/−	EP Group	EP Party
1979	Garret FitzGerald	464,451	33.1 (#2)	4 / 15	26.7 (#2)	New	EPP	EPP
1984	Garret FitzGerald	361,034	32.2 (#2)	6 / 15	40.0 (#2)	▲2	EPP	EPP
1989	Alan Dukes	353,094	21.6 (#2)	4 / 15	26.7 (#2)	▼2	EPP	EPP
1994	John Bruton	276,095	24.3 (#2)	4 / 15	26.7 (#2)	Steady	EPP	EPP
1999	John Bruton	342,171	24.6 (#2)	4 / 15	26.7 (#2)	Steady	EPP-ED	EPP
2004	Enda Kenny	494,412	27.8 (#1)	5 / 13	38.5 (#1)	▲1	EPP	EPP
2009	Enda Kenny	532,889	29.1 (#1)	4 / 12	33.3 (#1)	▼1	EPP	EPP
2014	Enda Kenny	369,120	38.5 (#1)	4 / 11	36.4 (#1)	Steady	EPP	EPP
2019	Leo Varadkar	496,459	29.6 (#1)	5 / 13	38.5 (#1)	▲1	EPP	EPP
2024	Simon Harris	362,766	20.8 (#1)	4 / 14	28.6 (#1)	▼1	EPP	EPP

== Electoral performance since 2009 ==
In the 2009 local elections held on 5 June 2009, Fine Gael won 556 seats, surpassing Fianna Fáil which won 407 seats, and making Fine Gael the largest party of local government nationally. They gained 88 seats from their 2004 result.

In the 2009 European Parliament election held on the same day as the local elections, which saw a reduction in the number seats from 13 to 12 for Ireland, the party won four seats, retaining the largest number of seats of an Irish party in the European Parliament. This was a loss of one seat from its 2004 result.

In the 2011 general election, Fine Gael gained 25 seats bringing them to a total of 76. The party ran candidates in all 43 constituencies and had candidates elected in every constituency except Dublin North-West. Fine Gael won 19 seats in Seanad Éireann following the 2011 election, a gain of four from the previous election in 2007.

While Fine Gael was responsible for the initial nomination of the uncontested, first President of Ireland, Douglas Hyde, a Fine Gael candidate has never won an election to the office of president. The Fine Gael presidential candidate, Gay Mitchell, finished fourth in the 2011 presidential election, with 6.4% of the vote. In 2004, Fine Gael supported the re-election of President Mary McAleese. Similarly, it supported the re-election of Michael D. Higgins in the 2018 presidential election.

In the 2016 general election the outgoing government consisting of Fine Gael and its partner the Labour Party was defeated. The previous government had the largest majority in the history of the state with a combined 113 seats out of the 166-seat Dáil Éireann. The aftermath of the general election resulted in months of negotiations for an agreement of government. A deal was reached with the main opposition and traditional rival Fianna Fáil to facilitate a minority Fine Gael-led government. Fine Gael governed Ireland alone with eight Independent members of the Dáil until 2020, when the party emerged as the third party following the general election. After governing for several months in a caretaker capacity, Fine Gael agreed to serve in a historic coalition government along with its traditional rival, Fianna Fáil, and the Green Party, with Fianna Fáil leader Micheál Martin serving as Taoiseach and Leo Varadkar serving as Tánaiste. As per the agreed Programme for Government, on 17 December 2022, Leo Varadkar returned to the role of Taoiseach with Micheál Martin as Tánaiste.

== Young Fine Gael ==
Young Fine Gael (YFG) is the autonomous youth movement of Fine Gael. It was founded in 1976 by party leader Garret FitzGerald. It caters for young people under 35 with an interest in Fine Gael and politics, in cities, towns and third level colleges throughout Ireland. YFG is led by its national executive consisting of ten members elected on a regional basis, and on a national panel.

== See also ==
- List of political parties in the Republic of Ireland

== Bibliography ==
- Nealon's Guide to the 29th Dáil and Seanad (Gill and Macmillan, 2002) (ISBN 0-7171-3288-9)
- Stephen Collins, "The Cosgrave Legacy" (Blackwater, 1996) (ISBN 0-86121-658-X)
- Garret FitzGerald, "Garret FitzGerald: An Autobiography" (Gill and Macmillan, 1991) (ISBN 0-7171-1600-X)
- Jack Jones, In Your Opinion: Political and Social Trends in Ireland through the Eyes of the Electorate (Townhouse, 2001) (ISBN 1-86059-149-3)
- Maurice Manning, James Dillon: A Biography (Wolfhound, 1999–2000) (ISBN 0-86327-823-X)
- Stephen O'Byrnes, Hiding Behind a Face: Fine Gael under FitzGerald (Gill and Macmillan: 1986) (ISBN 0-7171-1448-1)
- Raymond Smith, Garret: The Enigma (Aherlow, 1985) (no ISBN)
