= Mulroney =

Mulroney is a surname of Irish origin. Notable people with the surname include:

- The Mulroney family, a Canadian political and media family
  - Brian Mulroney (1939–2024), Prime Minister of Canada 1984–1993
    - Mila Mulroney (born 1953), wife of Brian Mulroney
    - Caroline Mulroney (born 1974), daughter of Brian Mulroney; former Ontario cabinet minister
    - Ben Mulroney (born 1976), son of Brian Mulroney; Canadian television host
- Dermot Mulroney (born 1963), American actor
- Kieran Mulroney (born 1965), American television actor and musician

== See also ==
- Mulrooney
- Maroney
