= Kermit (given name) =

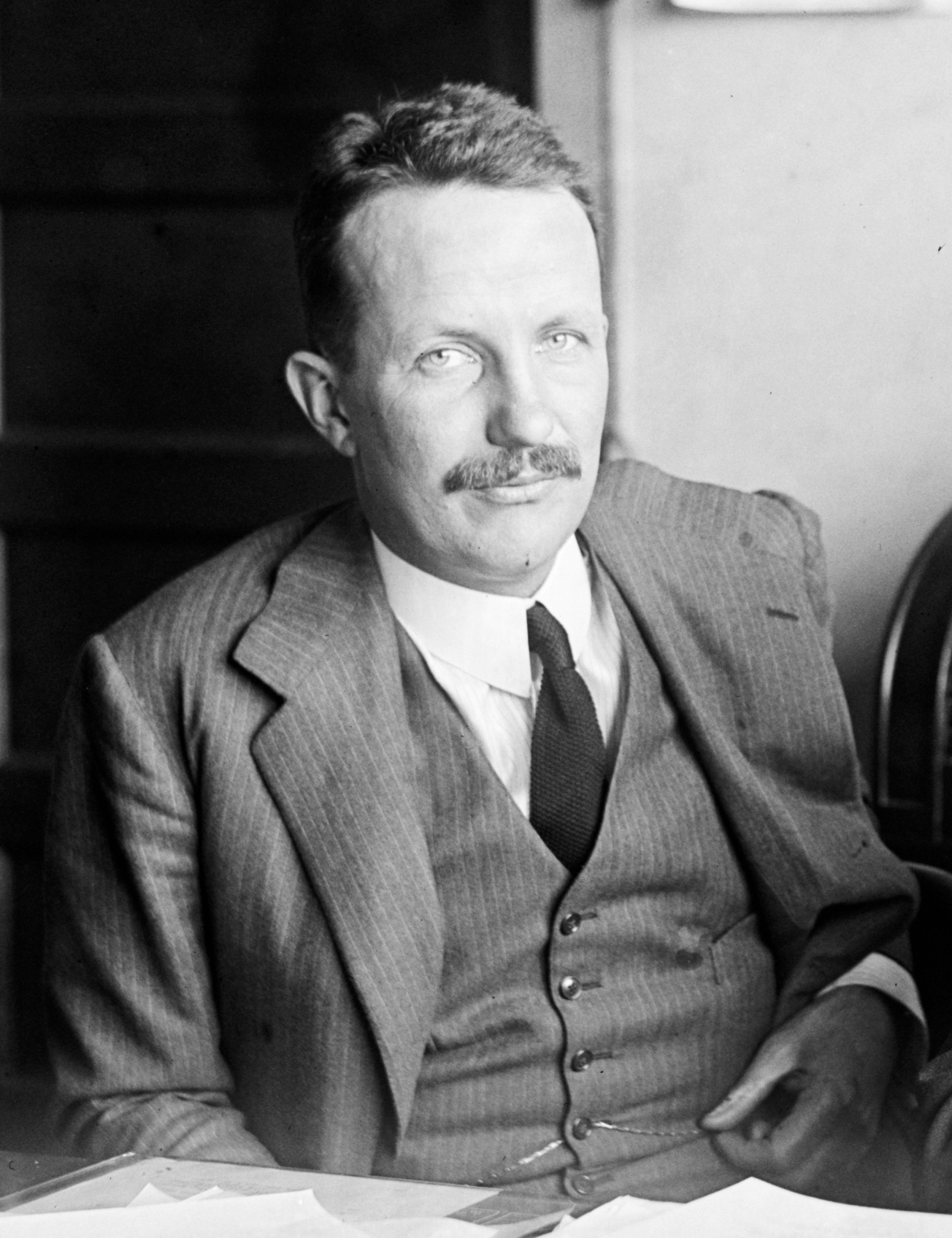
- Kermit Roosevelt
- Gender: male

Origin
- Origin: Irish and Manx
- Meaning: son of Dermot

Kermit is a male given name found mainly in the United States. It is a variant spelling of Kermode, a surname in the Isle of Man, which itself is a Manx-language variant of Mac Diarmata, an Irish language patronymic anglicised MacDermot. The name Kermit came to prominence through Kermit Roosevelt (1889–1943), son of U.S. President Theodore Roosevelt, named for Robert Kermit, a maternal great-uncle. The character Kermit the Frog, introduced in 1955, made the name known internationally through the television programs Sesame Street (from 1969) and The Muppet Show (from 1976).

== People with the given name Kermit ==
=== A–G ===
- Kermit Alexander (born 1941), former American football player
- Kermit Beahan (1918–1989), U.S. Air Force officer who dropped the atomic bomb on Nagasaki
- Kermit Bloomgarden (1904–1976), American theatrical producer
- Kermit Blossor (1911–2006), namesake of the Kermit Blosser Ohio Athletics Hall of Fame
- Kermit Blount (born 1958), former head college football coach at Winston-Salem State University
- Kermit Brashear (born 1944), American politician
- Kermit Brown (born 1942), American politician
- Kermit Edward Bye (1937–2021), United States Circuit Judge
- Kermit S. Champa (1939–2004), American art historian and educator
- Kermit Cintrón (born 1979), boxer
- Kermit R. Cofer (1908–1989), associate justice of the Supreme Court of Mississippi
- Kermit Davis (born 1959), men's basketball head coach at Mississippi University
- Kermit Dial (1908–1982), American Negro League infielder
- Kermit Driscoll (born 1956), jazz bassist
- Kermit Eady (1940–2019), American social worker
- Kermit Erasmus (born 1990), footballer
- Kermit Goell (1915–1997), American songwriter and archaeologist
- Kermit Gordon (1916–1976), Director of the United States Bureau of the Budget
- Kermit Gosnell (1941–2026), physician and convicted murderer

=== H–R ===
- Kermit L. Hall (1944–2006), legal historian and university president
- Kermit Holmes (born 1969), American basketball player and coach
- Kermit Hunter (1910–2001), playwright
- Kermit Johnson (born 1952), football player
- Kermit D. Johnson (1928–2020), American Army chaplain
- Kermit E. Krantz (1923–2007), physician
- Kermit Lipez (born 1941), United States Circuit Judge
- Kermit Love (1916–2008), puppeteer and actor
- Kermit Lynch (born 1941), wine importer, author, and winemaker
- Kermit Maynard (1897–1971), American actor and stuntman
- Kermit Moore (1929–2013), American conductor, cellist, and composer
- Kermit Moyer (born 1943), American author
- Kermit Murdock (1908–1981), American actor
- Kermit Oliver (born 1943), American painter
- Kermit Poling (born 1960), American conductor, violinist, and composer
- Kermit Quinn (fl. 1990s–2010s), American R&B singer
- Kermit Roosevelt (disambiguation), descendants of U.S. President Theodore Roosevelt
- Kermit Ruffins (born 1964), jazz musician

=== S–Z ===
- Kermit A. Sande (1943–2018), American politician
- Kermit Schafer (1914–1979), writer and producer
- Kermit Schmidt (1908–1963), American football end and halfback
- Kermit Scott (1936–2008), American counselor and professor of philosophy
- Kermit Scott (musician) (died 2002), jazz tenor saxophonist
- Kermit Sheets (1915–2006), actor, director, playwright
- Kermit Smith (fl. 2000s–2020s), American college baseball player and coach
- Kermit Smith Jr. (1957–1995), convicted and executed murderer
- Kermit Staggers (1947–2019), politician
- Kermit Tesoro (born 1988), Filipino visual, installation, accessory, and fashion designer
- Kermit Tipton (died 2012), namesake of Kermit Tipton Stadium in Johnson City, Tennessee
- Kermit Tyler (1913–2010), American Air Force officer
- Kermit Van Every (1915–1998), American aeronautical engineer
- Kermit Wahl (1922–1987), American professional baseball player
- Kermit Washington (born 1951), former NBA basketball player
- Kermit Weeks (born 1953), aviation enthusiast and collector/restorer
- Kermit Whitfield (born 1993), American football wide receiver
- Kermit Williams (born 1954), American politician
- Kermit Zarley (born 1941), professional golfer and author

=== Fictional characters ===
- Kermit the Frog, of Muppets fame, introduced in 1955
- Kermit the Hermit, a 1965 book by Bill Peet

== See also ==
- Edith Kermit Carow Roosevelt (1861–1948), second wife of U.S. President Theodore Roosevelt
- Robert Kermit (1794 - 1855), American shipowner
