= Itaca Records =

- Founded: 1950
- Genre: Instrumental rock, jazz rock, electronica
- Country of origin: Spain
- Location: Málaga
- Official website: www.itacarecords.com

Itaca Records is a music label established in Málaga (Spain) in 2011 with the aim of covering Spanish bands which do not fit in traditional Spanish music labels. Most of the groups belonging to this label play instrumental rock and related genres such as jazz rock and electronica.

Itaca Records launched the first volume of the Itaca Records Compilations in 2012, which includes tracks by the six bands in the label.

All groups in the label were played on the radio show La Ruleta Rusa, as their #185 programme was devoted to this label in September 2014.

The band from the Basque Country Buffalo joined Itaca Records in December 2016.

== Bands ==
- Commonplaces (Cádiz)
- Cró! (Vigo)
- GANZ (Madrid)
- Kermit (Málaga)
- Music Komite (Cádiz)
- Proyecto Parada (Málaga)
- Buffalo.
