= MacDermot Roe =

Family name

MacDermot Roe (MacDiarmata Ruadh) is the name of a sept of the MacDermot Kings of Moylurg.

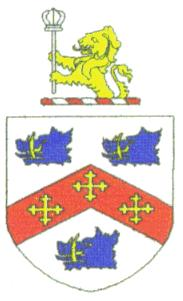
MacDermot Roe Coat of Arms

Tracing their origin to 1266, the MacDermots Roe (MacDiarmata Ruadh) of Ireland served as Biatachs General of the Kingdom of Connacht and were the principal patrons of the Irish composer Turlough Carolan, 1670–1738. The MacDermots Roe exemplify the role played by a leading Irish family under the old Gaelic order and its fate after the consolidation of English rule in the early 17th century.

== Origins ==
The MacDermots Roe descend from Dermot Roe (the appellation Roe or Ruadh meaning red in Irish), grandson of Cormac MacDermot, King of Moylurg, 1218–1244. Moylurg was an ancient kingdom in what is now northern County Roscommon, Ireland and lay within the Kingdom of Connacht which included the modern counties of Galway, Leitrim, Mayo, Roscommon and Sligo.

In 1266, Dermot Roe MacDermot, the grandson of Cormac MacDermot, King of Moylurg, was blinded by the Aedh mac Felim Ua Conchobair, King of Connacht. Thereafter, Dermot was known as Dermot Dall (Dall meaning blind in Irish). Dermot Dall had a grandson, Dermot Roe whose descendants adopted the surname Mac (son of) Dermot Roe to distinguish themselves from other members of the MacDermot family.

== Biatach General ==
Cormac MacDermot Roe, who was killed in battle in 1365, was the Biatach General of Connacht. As Biatach General, Cormac was responsible for the welfare of the poor and homeless and for the provision of food and shelter to travellers throughout Connacht.

Some sources state that the position of Biatach included responsibility for providing victuals to the chief's soldiers. Thus, MacDermot Roe's responsibilities as Biatach General may have been comparable to a modern Quartermaster General, as well as, head of social welfare services.

Positions of this nature in Ireland were passed down within a given family. For example, the head of the MacDermot family was the hereditary Marshal of Connacht. Such was the case with the MacDermots Roe and the office of Biatach General of Connacht.

In addition to their charitable duties as Biatachs General, the MacDermots Roe were church leaders serving as bishops, abbots and priors. Additionally, in 1385, the MacDermots Roe established the Dominican Priory of the Holy Cross at Cloonshanville, near modern-day Frenchpark in County Roscommon.

== Expansion of the MacDermots Roe ==
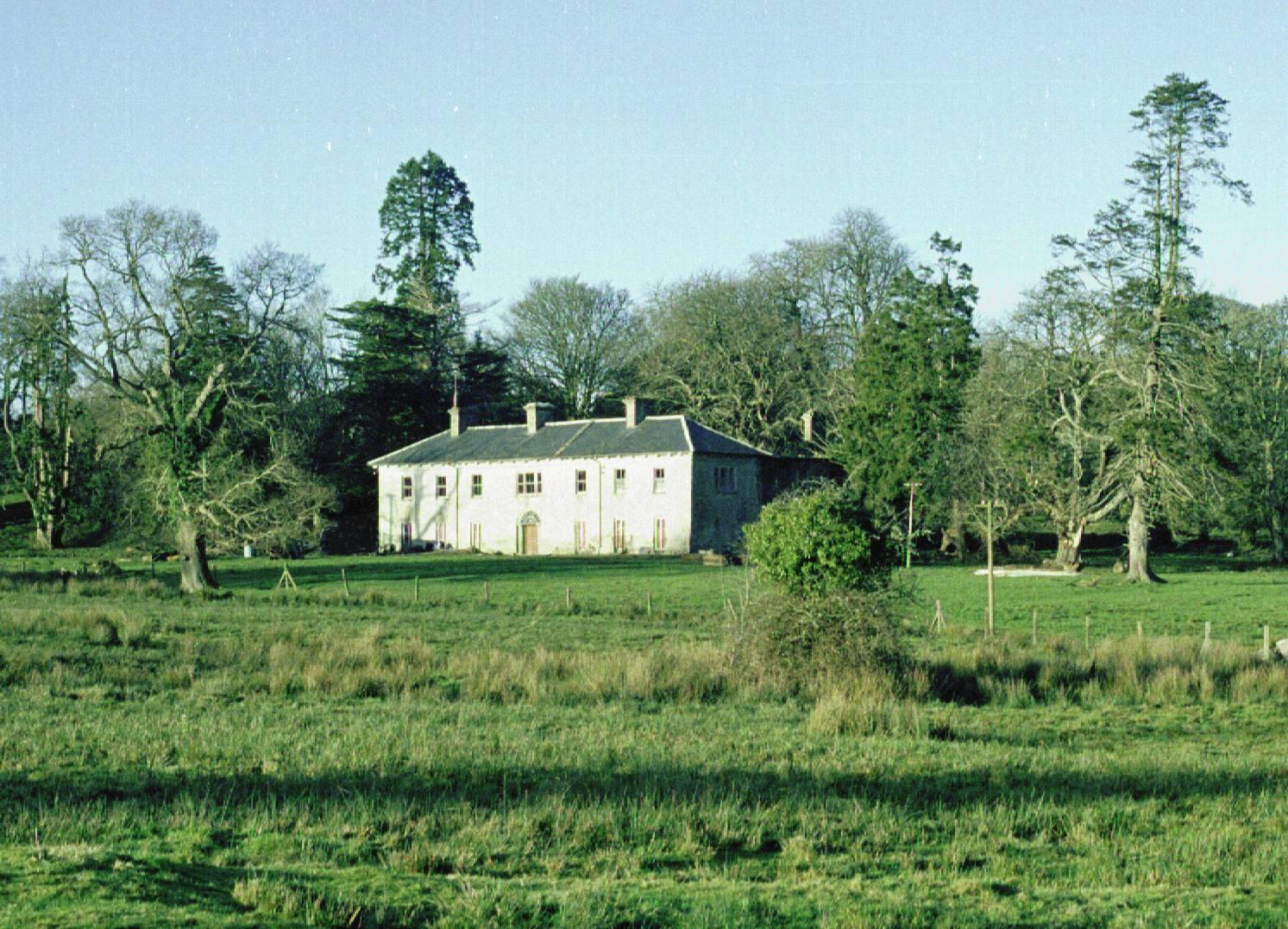
Alderford House, Seat of the MacDermot Roe, Kilronan Parish, County Roscommon, Ireland

In 1455 and again 1471, the MacDermots Roe are described as Lords of Coilte Conchoghair, a small territory between the Feorish and Arigna Rivers, now the northern portion of Kilronan Parish, County Roscommon. By the 16th century, the MacDermots Roe, apparently displacing the MacManus family, controlled all Kilronan including valuable iron mines and iron works around Arigna.

While the family eventually spread, not only, throughout Moylurg, but also, further south in County Roscommon, their headquarters remained in Kilronan at Alderford, formerly Camagh, near Ballyfarnon. By the end of the Gaelic period, the MacDermots Roe accounted for about one third of the MacDermot Clan.

The MacDermots were vigorous supporters of Ireland's Nine Years War against England and were conspicuous in the Irish victory at the Battle of Curlew Pass in 1599. However, the MacDermots Roe were more cautious. In a report dated September 1597, Sir Conyers Clifford, English President of Connacht, wrote that the MacDermots Roe had come to him and were living about Boyle Abbey.

== English colonial period ==
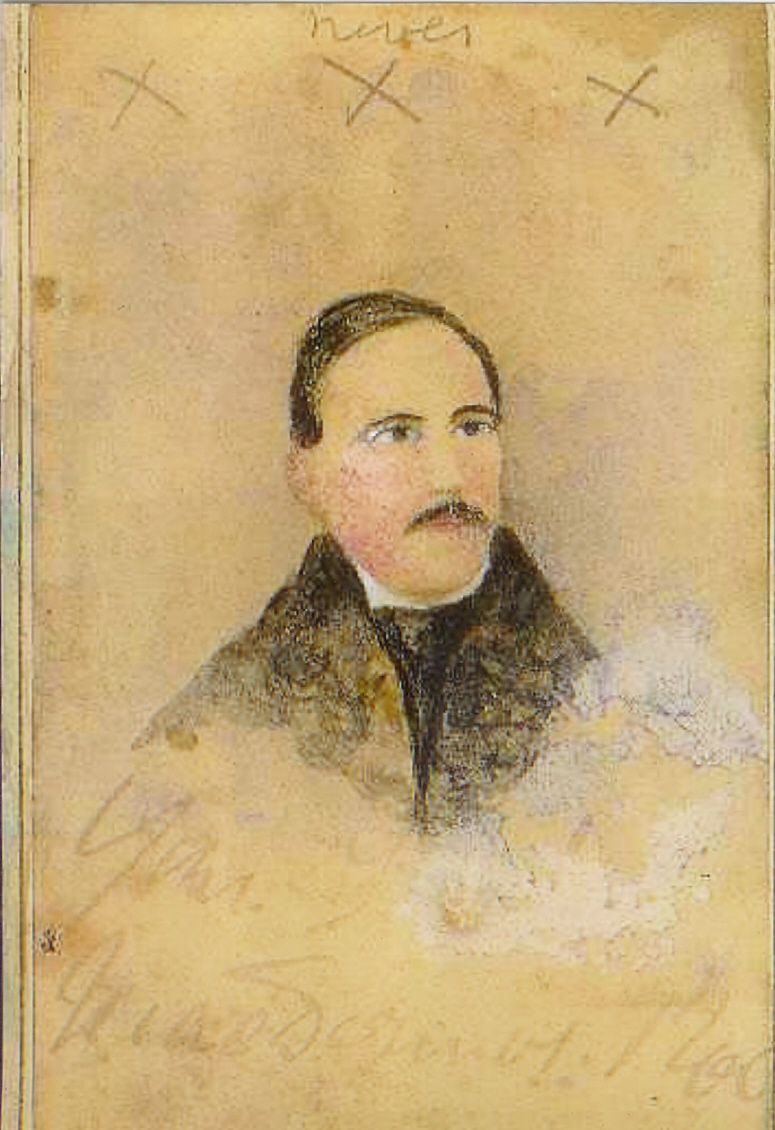
Thomas Charles MacDermot Roe of Alderford,1847–1913

In 1607 Conor MacDermot Roe, a cousin of Ferghal, the last MacDermot Roe chieftain elected under the Gaelic brehon legal system, surrendered MacDermot Roe lands in Kilronan to King James I and received them back in fee simple as a grant from the King. In the grant, Conor is referred to merely as a "representative" of the family.

The 1607 surrender and re-grant to Conor MacDermotRoe was illustrative of the eclipse of the Gaelic order. The English abolished the Irish brehon legal system and along with it the Irish system of clan land ownership and the Irish practice of electing clan chiefs. Henceforth, the chief's property and his title passed to the eldest son under primogeniture.

The MacDermots Roe were Jacobites, supporting James II against William of Orange following the 1688 English Revolution. Sir Terence Dermott served as Lord Mayor of Dublin in 1689 under James II. Later, Sir Terence followed James II into exile at Saint-Germain-en-Laye, France where the King made him a captain of a privateer vessel. Henry MacDermot Roe was a Jacobite captain in the army of James II.

Despite their support for the Stuarts, the MacDermots Roe of Alderford continued to have substantial landholdings in Kilronan while remaining Catholic. However, following the death of Charles MacDermot Roe in 1759, Charles' brother John, who had become a Protestant, evicted Charles' family from Alderford.

John's descendants became officials of the Anglo-Irish government. Thomas Charles MacDermot Roe was High Sheriff of Roscommon and Justice of the Peace in Counties Roscommon and Sligo in 1875. His line became extinct in 1917.

== Patrons of Carolan ==
The MacDermots Roe were the principal patrons of the Irish composer Turlough Carolan. Carolan is often referred to as the last of the great bards and is considered by many to be Ireland's national composer.

The MacDermots Roe patronage of Carolan was particularly significant since it came at a time when Gaelic culture was vigorously suppressed by English measures such as the Penal Laws. Since ancient times, Irish bards played an important cultural role preserving Irish myths, histories and genealogies in the oral tradition. Bards served as officials of kings and chiefs and, like Carolan, they travelled the kingdom composing songs for notables.

== Coat of arms ==
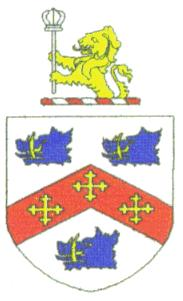
MacDermot Roe Coat of Arms

The coat of arms of the MacDermot Roe of Alderford was:

Dark Blue: 3 boars’ heads
Gold: Crosses, circles, boars’ tusks and bristles
Red: Band or chevron, boars’ tongues
White: Main part of shield

While the motto of the MacDermot Roe of Alderford was "Honor Probataque Virtus", an American branch of the MacDermots Roe has published the motto "Justice and Charity" reflecting the family's Biatach tradition.

== The MacDermots Roe Today ==
After the 17th century, the use of the appellation Roe went into steep decline and the Roe was generally dropped outside County Roscommon. While a substantial portion of the thousands of MacDermots living today descend from the MacDermots Roe, only a handful in Ireland, the United States and Australia have retained the appellation in their name. One branch of the family who emigrated to the United States in the late 19th century dropped the MacDermot and the family become known as Roe. To the extent the name has survived in modern times, it is expressed as one word:

McDermottroe - (Maria McDermottroe)
MacDermott-Roe
MacDermotRoe
McDermott-Roe

== Notable MacDermots Roe ==
=== Manus MacDermot Roe ===
In 1380, Manus was the Abbot of the Premonstratensian (reformed Augustinian) monastery on Trinity Island in Loch Ce in northern Roscommon.

=== Bernard MacDermot Roe ===
Bernard was Prior of the Dominican Priory at Cloonshanville in 1698 when he was forced into exile.

=== Ambrose MacDermot Roe ===
In April 1707, King James II of England, in exile at Saint-Germain-en-Laye, France recommended Ambrose as Bishop of Elphin to Pope Clement XI. Ambrose, who served as Bishop 1708–1717 during the Penal Laws, reported in 1714 that he had ordained 32 priests in his Diocese.

=== Thomas MacDermot Roe ===
Thomas, the third son of Carolan's patrons, was Bishop of Ardagh, 1747–1751.

=== Owen MacDermot ===
Owen was the secretary of the Dublin Society of United Irishmen. The United Irishmen, a nationalist group led by Wolfe Tone, sparked the unsuccessful Irish rebellion of 1798.

=== Thomas MacDermot ===
Brother of Owen, Thomas, born circa 1751, was Colonel of the Athleague Rangers, a Roscommon militia organisation. During the French Revolution, Thomas joined Lord Edward Fitzgerald and other Irish nationalists in Paris to enlist French support for Irish resistance to English rule.

=== Cornelius MacDermot Roe ===
Cornelius was George Washington's mason at Mount Vernon from 1784 to 1788. After leaving Washington's service, Cornelius was hired to lay the foundation for one wing of the United States Capitol but did not complete the project due to a contract dispute.

== See also ==
- Chiefs of the Name
- Kings of Moylurg
