= Maelsechlainn mac Tadhg Mor =

Maelsechlainn mac Tadhg Mor

The Annals of the Four Masters record Maelsechlainn with this terse entry: "Maelseachlainn, son of Tadhg, son of Maelruanaidh, lord of Magh-Luirg, was slain by the men of Breifne and Tighearnan Ua Ruairc."

Preceded by Tadhg Mor mac Maelruanaidh	King of Moylurg; 1124–1124	Succeeded by Dermot mac Tadhg Mor
