= Kermode =

Kermode is a surname of Manx origin. Notable people with the surname include:

- Robert Kermode (1812–1870), Tasmanian politician
- Josephine Kermode (Cushag, 1852–1937), Manx poet and playwright
- Philip Moore Callow Kermode (1855–1932), Manx antiquarian and historian
- Georgina Kermode MIM (1868–1923), suffragette, metallurgist, engineering entrepreneur and holder of numerous patents.
- Alexander Kermode (1876–1934), Australian cricketer
- Derwent Kermode (1898–1960), British diplomat
- Frank Kermode (1919–2010), British literary critic
- Harry Kermode (1922–2009), Canadian basketball player
- Jonathan Kermode (fl. 1970s), musician in the band Half Brother
- Robin Kermode (born 1958), British actor, author and communications coach
- Mark Kermode (born 1963), British film critic
- Chris Kermode (born 1965), English tennis administrator

== Other ==
- Kermode bear, also known as the spirit bear

== See also ==
- Kermit (given name)
- MacDermot, a surname of which Kermode is a variant
