= National Centre Party (Ireland) =

Defunct political party in the Irish Free State

- Chairman: Frank MacDermot
- Founded: 15 September 1932
- Dissolved: 1933
- Merged into: Fine Gael
- Ideology: Agrarianism; Conservatism; Christian democracy
- Political position: Centre-right

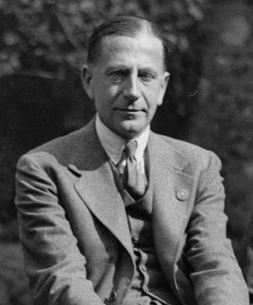
Frank MacDermot

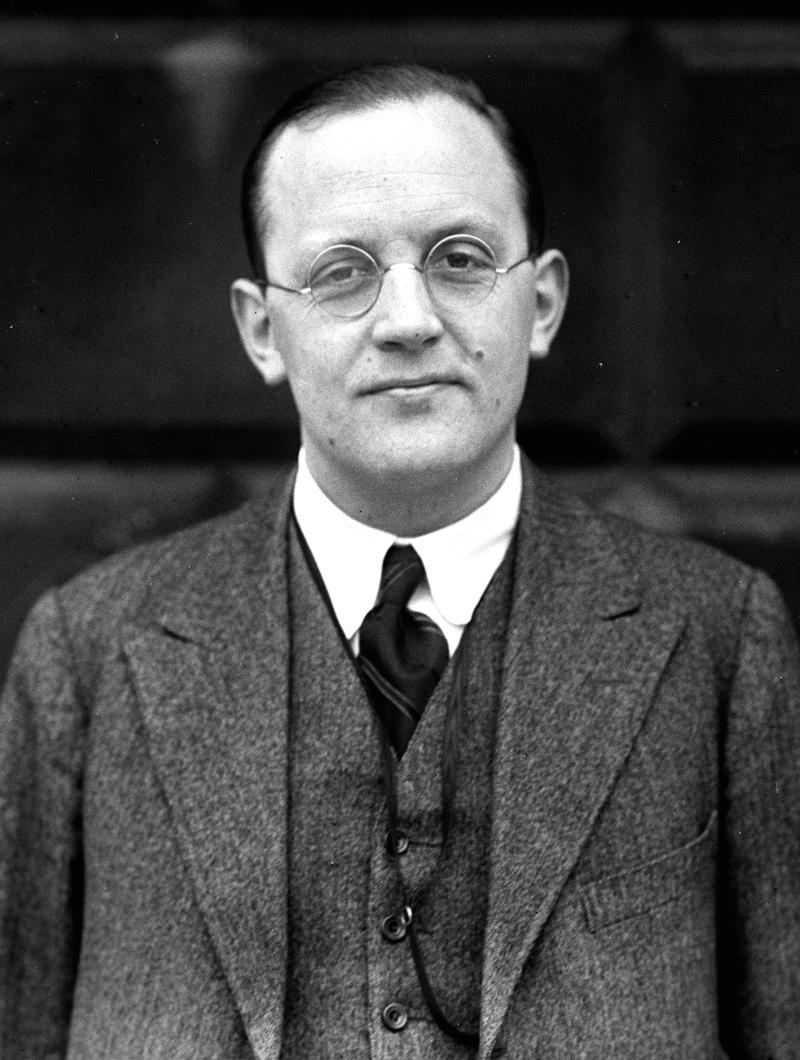
James Dillon

Frank MacDermot and James Dillon were two of the central figures of the National Centre Party

The National Centre Party, initially known as the National Farmers and Ratepayers League, was a short-lived political party in the Irish Free State. It was founded on 15 September 1932 in the Mansion House, Dublin, with the support of several sitting TDs, including the three Farmers' Party members and thirteen Independents, all of whom feared for their political future if they did not coordinate in a common organisation. Prominent among the latter were party leader Frank MacDermot, a TD for Roscommon since the general election of February 1932, and James Dillon, a TD for Donegal, who was the son of John Dillon, the last leader of the Irish Parliamentary Party.

The party's policies included the establishment of a central bank (at this time, the Free State was still part of the sterling area, and the Bank of Ireland served as lender to the government), deflation through pay cuts, protectionism, an end to the Anglo-Irish Trade War and the removal of rates on agricultural land. The party was strongly opposed to Fianna Fáil, despite apparent similarities of policy, perhaps because most National Centre Party deputies represented rural constituencies. Fianna Fáil, with its strength among small farmers and increasing popularity among the rural middle-class, was the most obvious threat to a rural-based party at this time.

In the 1933 general election, the new party won eleven seats. During this election, the party's opponents in Fianna Fáil disrupted National Centre Party meetings, often with the assistance of the prohibited Irish Republican Army. These incidents contributed to the rise of the Army Comrades Association (more commonly known as the Blueshirts), which was formed to protect the establishment conservative parties from the perceived threat of political violence. Fianna Fáil formed a majority government after the election. During the first Fianna Fáil government, the National Centre Party aligned with the largest opposition party, Cumann na nGaedheal, on almost all issues of political or economic importance. However, Frank MacDermot rejected a suggestion that the two parties should merge.

The opposition parties united in mutual self-defence when the government banned the Army Comrades Association in August 1933. The two parties and the ACA merged to form Fine Gael in September, just eleven months after the formation of the National Centre Party. Included in the six National Centre Party members of the first Fine Gael National Executive were FB Barton, P Baxter and EJ Cussen.

Although MacDermot became a vice-president of Fine Gael at its foundation, he differed from most of his party colleagues on issues such as the degree of emphasis to be given to Ireland's membership of the British Commonwealth. He ultimately resigned from the party, to sit as an independent.

== General election results ==
Election	Seats won	±	Position	First Pref votes	%	Government	Leader
1933	11 / 153	▲11	▲3rd	126,909	9.2%	Opposition	Frank MacDermot

== See also ==
- Category:National Centre Party (Ireland) politicians
