= Dermott (disambiguation) =

Dermott, Arkansas is a city in Chicot County, Arkansas, United States.

Dermott may also refer to:

== People with the given name ==
- Dermott Downs (born 1962), an American television director, actor, producer and cinematographer
- Dermott Petty, an independent filmmaker from Ireland
- Dermott Lennon (born 1969), an equestrian from Northern Ireland
- Dermott Brereton (born 1964), a former professional Australian rules football player
- Dermott Monteith (1943–2009), an Irish international cricketer

== Surname ==
- Beau Dermott (born 2003), British musical theatre singer
- Blake Dermott (born 1961), former professional Canadian football offensive lineman for the Edmonton Eskimos
- Gertrude Dermott (1874–1950), American stage actress known professionally as Gertrude Elliott
- Jessie Dermott (1868–1940), American actress and businesswoman known professionally as Maxine Elliott
- Kim Dermott, former association football player from New Zealand
- Martin Dermott (born 1967), English former professional rugby league footballer
- Travis Dermott (born 1996), Canadian professional ice hockey defenceman
- Laurence Dermott (1720–1791), Irish Freemason

== Other uses ==
- 3647 Dermott, an asteroid

== See also ==
- McDermott
