= Kermit (band) =

Spanish instrumental rock band

- Origin: Málaga, Spain
- Genres: post-rock, progressive rock, psychedelia, space rock, jazz rock, electronica, avant-garde
- Years active: 2011–present
- Labels: Itaca Records
- Members: Gonzalo Presa; Miguel Seguí; Fco. Trujillo; Álvaro Parada

Kermit is an instrumental rock quartet formed in 2011 in Málaga, Spain, by Gonzalo Presa on guitars, drums, percussion and vocals, Miguel Seguí on guitars, synth and sampler, Francisco Trujillo on the electric bass, and Álvaro Parada on drums, percussion, saxophone and vocals.

Up to date, Kermit have released two studio albums titled Autoficción (Spanish for 'Autofiction'; 2012) and Litoral (Spanish for 'Coast'; 2014) through the Spanish music label Itaca Records.

== Bio ==
Kermit was formed in the summer of 2010 in Málaga by former components of several local bands such as Parcel, White Coffee, Seattle Apples and Satélites. Gonzalo, Miguel and Francisco began to write the songs that would later be included in Kermit's debut album, and Alvaro joined the band behind the drums when the album was almost completely written. Alvaro also plays the drums and percussion in Proyecto Parada.

== Autoficción ==
Kermit released their debut album titled Autoficción in November 2012 with label Itaca Records in CD, vinyl and name-your-price download through the label's website and German netlabel PiN Musik's Bandcamp. It is an 11-track album in which, in words of the band themselves, they play "with the endless possibilities offered by two guitars, a bass and a drumkit".

The album was recorded in Dune 2.0 studios with sound engineer Sergio Cascales, assisted by the band's guitar player —Gonzalo Presa. "Kermit's production draws its influences from multiple sources, from Radiohead to even Refused or At the Drive-In, including the heterogeneous names of Portishead, Sonic Youth, Mogwai and Pink Floyd, yet without neglecting other artistic expressions such as literature or films." "The album title itself indicates that literature plays a relevant role in the band's imagery, and idea confirmed by the album's CD and vinyl leaflets. South-American authors such as Cortázar, Borges and Bolaño seem those most relevant to the band, but Kafka, Rimbaud or Valle-Inclán can also be traced easily, surely forming part of the band members' personal libraries. Films, architecture and graphic design are other sources for their influences." In fact, the album cover is "the visual poem Sion by Cesárea Tinajero, the poetess the main characters in Bolaño's The Savage Detectives look for throughout the whole novel. Autoficción is about the idea of the travel and discovery of new, not necessarily exterior, places."

As a première of the album, the fragment corresponding to the track titled "Cocaine" was extracted from a live sessions recorded in HD video at the Instituto Politécnico Jesús Marín High School, completed by students from vocational courses on Sound Engineering and Image. These full sessions, including 8 tracks from Kermit's debut album, were published some months later through YouTube under the title IPJM Sessions.

After the presentation of the band in La Casa Invisible on April 14 and of Autoficción in Teatro Echegaray on October 22, album release was followed by a brief Andalusian tour with Madrid band Autumn Comets, including visits to Don Benito and Madrid. In the summer of 2012 Kermit were shortlisted in the Wild Weekend contest and won third prize in Málaga Crea for the category of pop-rock. Kermit also played the SMS Festival in the summer of 2013 in Centro de Arte Contemporáneo de Málaga.

== Litoral ==
Kermit released their second album, titled Litoral, in April 2014. It is a tribute to the homonymous literary journal created by poets Manuel Altolaguirre and Emilio Prados in Málaga in 1926, as well as to Imprenta Sur. Litoral is considered the main expression means of the so-called Generation of '27. Indeed, it is the journal's current director and graphic designer, Emilio Prados' great-grandson, Lorenzo Saval, who is in charge of the album's graphic design and illustration, being again released in CD and vinyl formats through Itaca Records' website, and in name-your-price download through Bandcamp and SoundCloud. The band themselves have expressed their intention of the album being understood "as an additional issue of this poetry and thought journal, yet a sound one", since its 7 tracks go on uninterruptedly from the opener "1926" to the closer "1927", years which correspond to the first stage of the Litoral journal, which comprised its 9 first issues.

Litoral is an album in which Kermit complete "a trip through psychedelia, post-rock, impossible passages and the most absorbing adventure. [...] transcending the musical sphere, mixing literature, philosophy and other artistic fields [...] [in which] more or less classic structures lie the foundation for more hypnotic parts. Some stretches get close to progressive rock, while some others are just pure jazz.” “Relative to their debut, Litoral is an album more focused on jazz than on instrumental rock, although without losing that essence of rhythm changes and epic crescendos. Litoral runs seamlessly for 45 minutes, intertwining small jewels that include psychodelia ("Samhain") or electronica in up-tempo tracks ("Magnitizdat"), where the rhythm base mixes with spoken word and an improvised saxophone line.” “Litoral cannot therefore be understood but as a further step toward a junction of influences that is perhaps lighted so much by Tortoise as by King Crimson, Slint or Radiohead, yet cinematographically told.”

"Litoral is a step forward in so many levels, mainly in music writing, because tracks such as "Samhain", "Circumpolares" and "Magnitizdat" are simply incredibly delicious, particularly the last one. However, it also means creative growth, since the elements which made their debut album so interested are powered here, yet everything seems under control at all times. There is post-rock, of course, but there is also more of King Crimson, more jazz, more electronica and even spoken word."

Litoral again contains numerous literary hints. Indeed, its 45 minutes echo verses and lines by Allen Ginsberg, George Orwell and Roberto Bolaño, as well as by local poets Raúl Díaz Rosales and bass player Francisco Trujillo.

As they did with their debut album, Litoral was presented with a video single ("Magnitizdat") extracted from live sessions at La Caverna de Amores, recorded in collaboration with La Trinchera Audiovisuales. The extracts corresponding to the tracks “We-tripantu” and “Circumpolares” (the album's fourth and third tracks, respectively) were also published on YouTube in 2014.

The album was presented live on April 26 in Auditorio Edgar Neville, in "a melancholic trip full of poetry, light and beauty", which was followed by a tour that took them to Algeciras, Cádiz, Seville, Jaén and Don Benito. On October 9 Litoral was presented in Teatro Echegaray with the support of art and design through projections by Calde Ramírez (Music Komite).

== Releases ==
- Autoficción (2012, Itaca Records)
- Litoral (2014, Itaca Records)

== Video ==
- "Cocaine" (2012, YouTube)
- IPJM Sessions (2012, YouTube)
- "Magnitizdat" (2014, YouTube)
- "We-tripantu" (2014, YouTube)
- "Circumpolares" (2014, YouTube)
- "1926" (2015, YouTube)
- LCDA Sessions (2015)
