= McDiarmid Falls =

- Interactive map of McDiarmid Falls
- Location: Wells Gray Provincial Park, British Columbia, Canada
- Coordinates: 51°50′03.32″N 120°03′12.77″W
- Type: Plunge
- Total height: 10 m (33 ft)
- Total width: 15 m (49 ft)
- Watercourse: Grouse Creek

McDiarmid Falls is a waterfall on Grouse Creek in Wells Gray Provincial Park, east-central British Columbia, Canada. It is located 100 m (328 ft) downstream from Moul Falls and 150 m (492 ft) upstream from Grouse Creek's confluence with the Clearwater River.

Grouse Creek rises from snowmelt, a lake and springs at a pass between Trophy Mountain and Table Mountain. It flows 18 km (11.2 mi) west before tumbling over Moul Falls and McDiarmid Falls. The creek drops a total of 150 m (492 ft) in its last 1 km (0.6 mi) as it has eroded into the escarpment of a volcanic plateau.

== Naming ==
McDiarmid Falls was named officially in 2000 and refers to Garfield (better known as Mac) and Cecile McDiarmid, a pioneer family of the Clearwater Valley. They moved to the area in 1944 and purchased 160 acres of land just south of Grouse Creek. In 1956 they purchased a separate property of 70 acres beside the Clearwater River and adjacent to both Moul Falls and McDiarmid Falls. Both waterfalls are just inside the expanded 1997 boundaries of Wells Gray Park. In the late 1940s, the McDiarmids established several cabins along the Clearwater River and their guiding business attracted many guests to the fabulous river fishing. In 1950, the McDiarmids started construction of Trophies Lodge which opened for business in 1953. Their guests stayed a night at Trophies Lodge, then were taken by horse down to the Clearwater River to stay in one of the fishing cabins for a week or longer. The McDiarmids prepared and served gourmet meals in this remote area and even provided nightly entertainment because Cecile was a trained opera singer. Some of their guests were renowned, including H.R. MacMillan, president of the forest company MacMillan Bloedel; he visited twice a year with an entourage of business friends and owned property on the Clearwater River from 1949 to 1972. When a logging road was built along the Clearwater River in 1965, the fishing was virtually destroyed within a few years. By 1973 the fishing cabins had been abandoned and the McDiarmids closed Trophies Lodge as a business, but continued to live in the large log building. Cecile died in 1986. Mac lived alone in his lodge until 1995 and died at the age of 92 in 1998.

Grouse Creek is the fourth name for the stream that forms McDiarmid Falls. No other Wells Gray Park place name has been changed more times. Surveyor Robert Lee referred to it as Beaver Creek on his maps drawn in 1912 to 1914. After the area was settled, the stream became known as Grouse Creek because of the profusion of blue grouse that inhabited these forests. The waterfall and creek were called Moul starting in the 1930s, referring to George William Moul, a nearby homesteader from 1915 to 1918. In the 1980s, locals gradually reverted to using the Grouse Creek name, even though "Moul Creek" appeared on all the maps. The Ministry of Highways erected a "Grouse Creek" sign on the Clearwater Valley Road bridge in 1990 which confused travellers even more. The following year, the Friends of Wells Gray Park requested a ruling from the Geographical Names Office in Victoria. After an investigation of local and historical usage, a decision was announced in favour of Grouse Creek. Moul Falls remained unchanged.

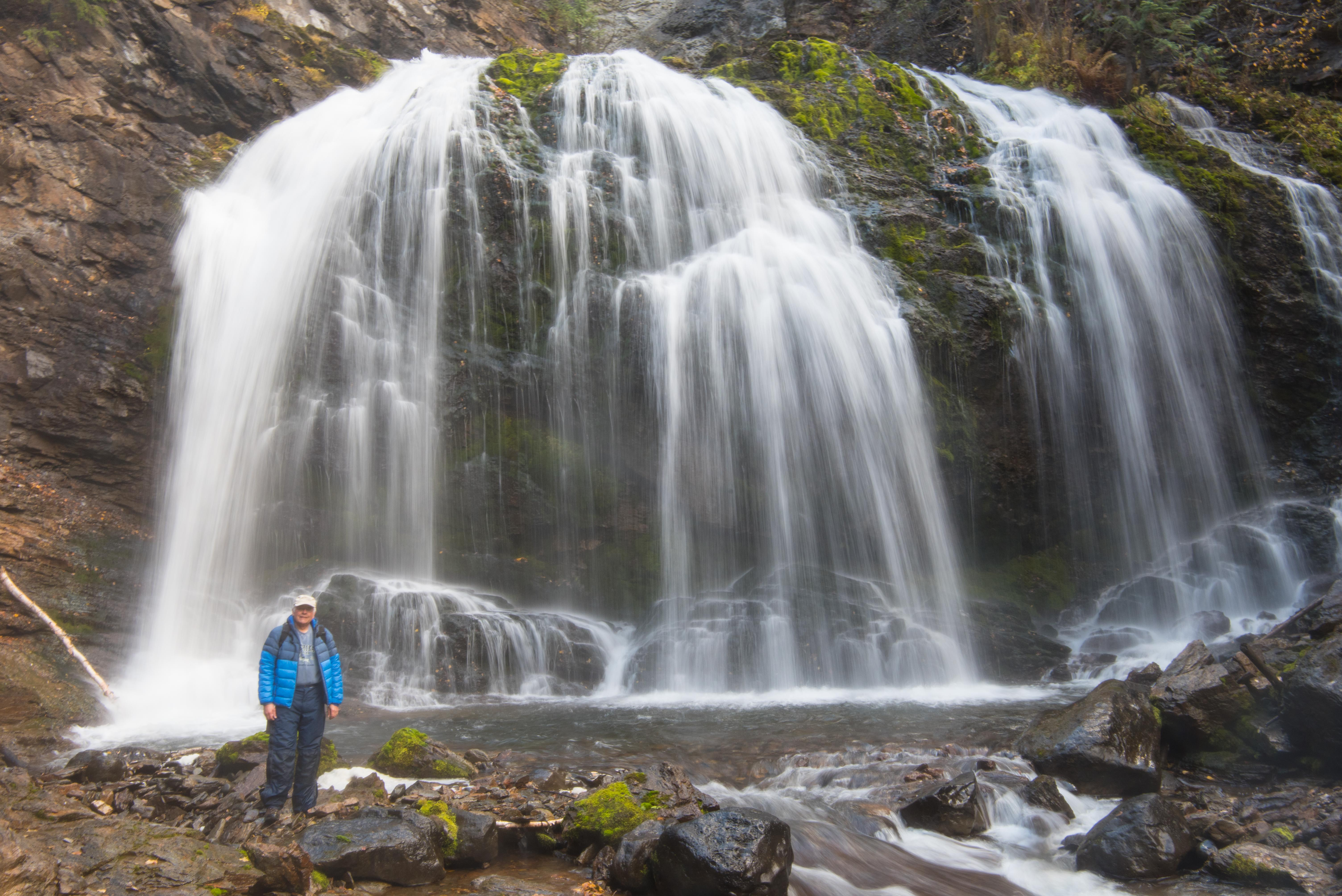
McDiarmid Falls

== Access ==
The trail to Moul Falls starts at a well-signed parking lot on Clearwater Valley Road (also called Wells Gray Park Road). A foot bridge crosses Grouse Creek above Moul Falls and the trail continues downhill to McDiarmid Falls and the Clearwater River.

In winters that are very cold and snowy, McDiarmid Falls freezes from top to bottom. The best access is using snowshoes.

== See also ==
- List of waterfalls
- List of waterfalls in British Columbia
