= Frank MacDermot =

Irish politician (1886–1975)

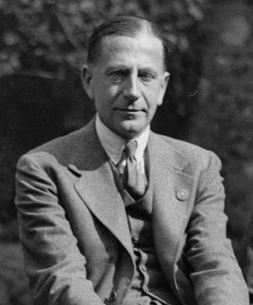
- MacDermot in 1933

Senator
- In office 27 April 1938 – 8 September 1943
- Constituency: Nominated by the Taoiseach

Teachta Dála
- In office February 1932 – July 1937
- Constituency: Roscommon

Personal details
- Born: 25 November 1886 Dublin, Ireland
- Died: 24 June 1975 (aged 88) London, England
- Party: Fine Gael
- Other political affiliations: Independent (1920–1932, 1938–1942); National Centre Party (1932–1933)
- Spouse: Elaine Thayer (m. 1931)
- Children: 1
- Parent: Hugh Hyacinth O'Rorke MacDermot (father)
- Relatives: Niall MacDermot (nephew)
- Education: University of Oxford; King's Inns

Military service
- Allegiance: United Kingdom
- Branch/service: British Army
- Rank: Major
- Unit: Royal Army Service Corps
- Battles/wars: World War I

Francis Charles MacDermot (25 November 1886 – 24 June 1975) was an Irish barrister, soldier, politician and historian who served as Senator from 1937 to 1943, after being nominated by the Taoiseach. He served as a Teachta Dála (TD) for the Roscommon constituency from 1932 to 1937. He was also a founding member of Fine Gael.

== Early life ==
MacDermot was born in Dublin, the seventh and youngest son of Hugh Hyacinth O'Rorke MacDermot, Prince of Coolavin. He was educated at Downside School and The Queen's College, Oxford and qualified as a barrister. He was commissioned into the Royal Army Service Corps during World War I and ended the war as a Major. He later emigrated to the United States and became a banker in New York City from 1919 until 1927.

== Political career ==
=== Early political career ===
He returned to Ireland in the late 1920s, and stood unsuccessfully as the Nationalist candidate for Belfast West at the 1929 United Kingdom general election. He was elected to Dáil Éireann at the 1932 general election as an Independent TD for Roscommon.

=== Founding of Fine Gael ===
In 1933, anticipating another election that year, he founded the National Centre Party alongside James Dillon, and became the party's leader. The party was short-lived; MacDermot led the National Centre Party to merge with Cumann na nGaedheal and the Blueshirts to form Fine Gael that same year, and became a vice-president of the new party. It was reputedly MacDermot who devised the name of the party.

He was a persistent critic of Fianna Fáil and Éamon de Valera. He criticised the abolition of the oath of allegiance, the abolition of the Free State Seanad Éireann, the abolition of the Governor-General and the introduction of the Constitution of Ireland in 1937, arguing each time that these actions would make partition more secure, and arguing the need for rapprochement with the government of Northern Ireland and the wider unionist community. He continually stated that partition could only be addressed when Dublin-London relationships were normalised.

MacDermot had led the National Centre Party into Fine Gael on the pretense that members of the Irish Republican Army were breaking up meetings of Cumann na nGaedheal and other right-wing parties in support of the Republican Fianna Fáil, and that in order to survive the National Centre Party would have to band together with both Cumann na nGaedheal and Eoin O'Duffy's Blueshirts. However, with the accession of Fianna Fáil to power and tough anti-IRA measure put in place by de Valera, the marriage of convenience rapidly became undone. O'Duffy had become the initial leader of the party but by the summer of 1934 he had become an embarrassment to the other leaders and members of the party when he openly questioned the value of democracy after Fine Gael came second to Fianna Fáil in the 1934 local elections. MacDermot and other constitutionalists in the party rebuked O'Duffy's comments. By September 1934, O'Duffy had resigned as leader and left the party.

O'Duffy's departure did not increase MacDermot's comfort with the big tent of Fine Gael; he resigned from the party in 1935 when members of Fine Gael criticised de Valera for condemning the invasion of Ethiopia by fascist Italy at a meeting of the League of Nations.

=== Late political career ===
In 1937, de Valera moved to introduce a new constitution of Ireland, and MacDermot was especially active in the debates over its contents. He objected to the recognition of Irish as the first official language of the state and to the suggestion that the Roman Catholic Church should be given a ‘special position’ in the constitution. He supported direct elections to the Seanad and argued that citizens of Northern Ireland should be allowed to participate in the referendum on the constitution. He also argued that each Dáil constituency should be at least five seats.

He did not seek re-election in 1938. De Valera, surprisingly, appointed him to the re-established Seanad, where he would remain until 1943. He had had personal differences with his Fine Gael colleagues on issues such as the degree of emphasis to be given to Ireland's membership of the Commonwealth. During World War II he was a critic of Irish neutrality throughout his tenure as a Senator, arguing that Ireland should be fighting with the Allies. He subsequently became the U.S. and Paris correspondent for The Irish Times newspaper.

In 1939 MacDermot's biography Theobald Wolfe Tone and His Times was published, which was widely praised was the definitive biography of Tone until Marianne Elliots biography in 1989.

== Personal life ==
While working in America, MacDermot met the American Elaine Orr Thayer, then the wife of the poet E. E. Cummings, her second marriage. Her first husband had been Scofield Thayer, whom she left for Cummings. Orr Thayer left Cummings for MacDermot, and at one point, Cummings considered killing MacDermot in revenge. Cummings and Elaine divorced, and subsequently, Frank and Elaine married before engaging Cummings in a protracted custody battle over Elaine's young daughter Nancy. Together Elaine and Frank had one son, Brian MacDermot. Orr Thayer died in 1974. MacDermot died in 1975 while on a visit to London.

Dáil	Election	Deputy (Party)	Deputy (Party)	Deputy (Party)	Deputy (Party)
4th	1923	George Noble Plunkett (Rep)	Henry Finlay (CnaG)	Gerald Boland (Rep)	Andrew Lavin (CnaG)
4th	1925 by-election	George Noble Plunkett (Rep)	Martin Conlon (CnaG)	Gerald Boland (Rep)	Andrew Lavin (CnaG)
5th	1927 (Jun)	Patrick O'Dowd (FF)	Martin Conlon (CnaG)	Gerald Boland (FF)	Michael Brennan (Ind.)
6th	1927 (Sep)	Patrick O'Dowd (FF)	Martin Conlon (CnaG)	Gerald Boland (FF)	Michael Brennan (Ind.)
7th	1932	Daniel O'Rourke (FF)	Martin Conlon (CnaG)	Gerald Boland (FF)	Frank MacDermot (NCP)
8th	1933	Patrick O'Dowd (FF)	Michael Brennan (CnaG)	Gerald Boland (FF)	Frank MacDermot (NCP)
9th	1937	Michael Brennan (FG)	Daniel O'Rourke (FF)	Gerald Boland (FF)	3 seats 1937–1948
10th	1938	Michael Brennan (FG)	Daniel O'Rourke (FF)	Gerald Boland (FF)	3 seats 1937–1948
11th	1943	John Meighan (CnaT)	John Beirne (CnaT)	Gerald Boland (FF)	3 seats 1937–1948
12th	1944	Daniel O'Rourke (FF)	John Beirne (CnaT)	Gerald Boland (FF)	3 seats 1937–1948
13th	1948	Daniel O'Rourke (FF)	John Beirne (CnaT)	Gerald Boland (FF)	Jack McQuillan (CnaP)
14th	1951	John Finan (CnaT)	John Beirne (CnaT)	Gerald Boland (FF)	Jack McQuillan (Ind.)
15th	1954	James Burke (FG)	John Beirne (CnaT)	Gerald Boland (FF)	Jack McQuillan (Ind.)
16th	1957	James Burke (FG)	John Beirne (CnaT)	Gerald Boland (FF)	Jack McQuillan (Ind.)
17th	1961	James Burke (FG)	Patrick J. Reynolds (FG)	Brian Lenihan Snr (FF)	Jack McQuillan (NPD)
17th	1964 by-election	Joan Burke (FG)	Patrick J. Reynolds (FG)	Brian Lenihan Snr (FF)	Jack McQuillan (NPD)
18th	1965	Joan Burke (FG)	Patrick J. Reynolds (FG)	Brian Lenihan Snr (FF)	Hugh Gibbons (FF)
19th	1969	Constituency abolished. See Roscommon–Leitrim			

Dáil	Election	Deputy (Party)	Deputy (Party)	Deputy (Party)
22nd	1981	Terry Leyden (FF)	Seán Doherty (FF)	John Connor (FG)
23rd	1982 (Feb)	Terry Leyden (FF)	Seán Doherty (FF)	Liam Naughten (FG)
24th	1982 (Nov)	Terry Leyden (FF)	Seán Doherty (FF)	Liam Naughten (FG)
25th	1987	Terry Leyden (FF)	Seán Doherty (FF)	Liam Naughten (FG)
26th	1989	Terry Leyden (FF)	Tom Foxe (Ind.)	John Connor (FG)
27th	1992	Constituency abolished. See Longford–Roscommon		
