= William McDiarmid House =

Historic house in North Carolina, United States

- U.S. National Register of Historic Places
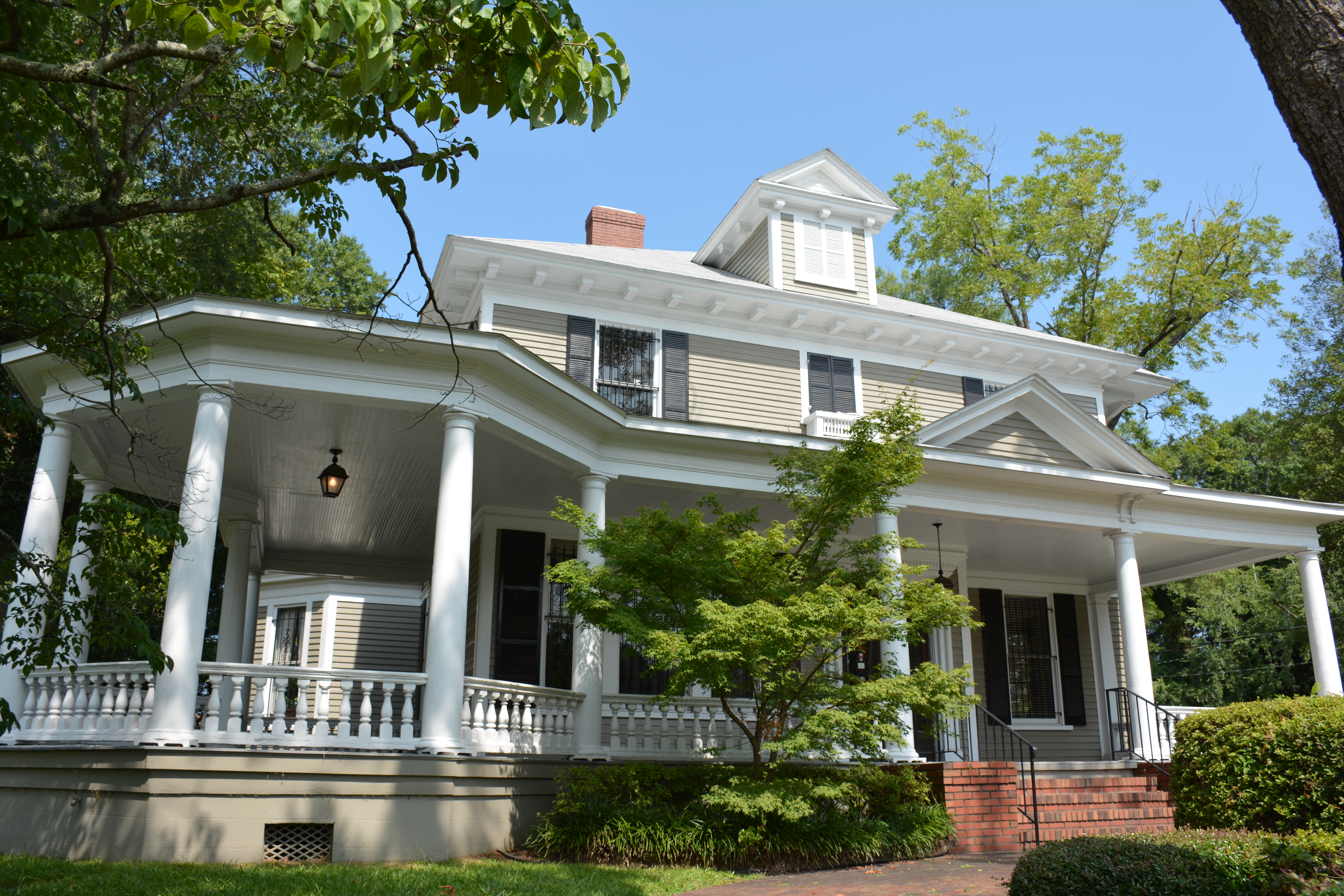

- Location within North Carolina Location within the United States
- Location: 330 Dick St., Fayetteville, North Carolina
- Coordinates: 35°2′51″N 78°52′45″W
- Area: less than one acre
- Built: 1907
- Architectural style: Late 19th And 20th Century Revivals, Late Victorian
- MPS: Fayetteville MRA
- NRHP reference No.: 83001863
- Added to NRHP: July 7, 1983

William McDiarmid House is a historic home located at Fayetteville, Cumberland County, North Carolina. It was built in 1907, and is a 2 1/2-story, three-bay, American Foursquare frame dwelling with Late Victorian / Colonial Revival styling. It features a massive wraparound porch with a gazebo-like pentagonal corner projection and Tuscan order columns.

It was listed on the National Register of Historic Places in 1983.
