= McDermitt =

McDermitt may refer to:

- Josh McDermitt (born 1978), American actor and comedian
- McDermitt, Nevada and Oregon, unincorporated community in the United States
- McDermitt Combined School, the K-12 school in McDermitt, Nevada and Oregon
- McDermitt State Airport, airport in Oregon
