= Mulrooney =

Mulrooney is a surname of Irish origin from the Irish . Notable people with the surname include:

- Belinda Mulrooney (1872–1967), Irish-American entrepreneur who made a fortune in the Klondike Gold Rush
- John Mulrooney (1958–2025), American comedian, actor, and television host
- Richard Mulrooney (born 1976), American major league soccer player
- Máel Sechnaill mac Máele Ruanaid - Malachy MacMulrooney - high king of Ireland

== See also ==
- Mulroney
