= Kermit Roosevelt (disambiguation) =

Kermit Roosevelt (1889–1943), was an explorer, author, and soldier; second son of U.S. President Theodore Roosevelt.

Kermit Roosevelt may also refer to:

- Kermit Roosevelt Jr. (1916–2000), CIA officer; eldest son of Kermit Roosevelt
- Kermit Roosevelt III (born 1971), law professor and author; grandson of Kermit Roosevelt Jr.
- USS Kermit Roosevelt, World War II and Korean War era repair ship

== See also ==
- Edith Roosevelt (Edith Kermit Carow Roosevelt, 1861–1948), second wife of U.S. President Theodore Roosevelt
