= Tadhg =

Irish masculine name

- Pronunciation: English: /taɪɡ/ TYGHE; Irish: [t̪ˠəiɡ, t̪ˠeːɡ]
- Gender: Masculine
- Language: Irish

Origin
- Origin: Ireland
- Derivation: Proto-Celtic *tazgj-o-
- Meaning: Poet, philosopher, storyteller

Other names
- Short form: Tig
- Pet name: Taidhgín
- Cognates: Teague, Taig, Taigue

Tadhg, also Taḋg (/taɪɡ/ TYGHE, Irish: [t̪ˠəiɡ, t̪ˠeːɡ]), commonly anglicized as "Taig" or "Teague", is an Irish and Scottish Gaelic masculine name that was very common when the Goidelic languages predominated, to the extent that it is a synecdoche for Irish-speaking man. The name signifies "poet" or "philosopher". This was also the name of many Gaelic Irish kings from the 10th to the 16th centuries, particularly in Connacht and Munster. Tadhg is most common in southwest Ireland, particularly in County Cork and County Kerry. The name has had a surge in popularity in the early 21st century; As of 2000 it was the 92nd most common name for baby boys in Ireland, according to the Central Statistics Office, rising to 69th by 2005. By 2022, it had risen to the 7th most common name for newly registered male births.

== Etymology ==
The commonly accepted meaning of Tadhg is "poet" or "storyteller". The ultimate derivation is from the Celtic *tazg(j)o-, who were poets in early Celtic society. In any case, the name is widely attested in Gaulish and early British names.

When the whole of Ireland was part of the United Kingdom, many Irish names and place-names were given English meanings. Due to similarity in sound, Tadhg is often listed as an Irish equivalent of the English-language names Timothy (Tim) or Thaddeus.

The name is also spelled "Taḋg" in Gaelic type with an overdot over the d to indicate it is lenited; the "dh" serves a similar purpose in the modern spelling. Tadhg has been anglicized as "Taihg", "Tighe" and "Teague". Alternative spellings include "Tadgh", "Tadhgh" and "Tadg".

== Synecdoche ==
Tadhg is also a metonym and was once so common as an Irish name that it became synonymous with the typical Irishman in the same way that Paddy or Mick might be today. Hence, Irish phrases such as Tadhg an mhargaidh (lit: Tadhg of the market) or Tadhg na sráide (lit: Tadhg of the street) are similar to the English language expression "average Joe" or "the man on the street"

The anglicisation Taig (and formerly Teague) has been used in English since the seventeenth century to refer to Irishmen. The Irish-language name is used defiantly in a Jacobite poem written in the 1690s:

Original	Translation
"You Popish rogue", ní leomhaid a labhairt sinn	"You Popish rogue" is not spoken
acht "Cromwellian dog" is focal faire againn	but "Cromwellian dog" is our watchword,
nó "cia sud thall" go teann gan eagla	"Who goes there" does not provoke fear,
"Mise Tadhg" géadh teinn an t-agallamh	"I am Tadhg" is the answer given

Taig in the Troubles in Northern Ireland was used as an abusive and pejorative term by Protestant loyalists to refer to Catholic nationalists.

== People with the name ==
=== Traditional ===
- Tadg mac Nuadat, a Druid in the Fenian Cycle, grandfather of Fionn mac Cumhail
- Tadhg Ó Cuinn (fl. October 1415), Irish scribe and author

=== Gaelic nobility ===
- Tadg mac Conchobair (died 900), king of Connacht
- Tadg mac Cathail (died 956), king of Connacht
- Tadg mac Conchobair (died 962), king of Ailech
- Tadhg mac Muircheartach (died 971), king of Uí Díarmata
- Tadhg Mór Ua Cellaigh (died 1014), king of Uí Maine
- Tadc mac Briain (died 1023), contender for king of Munster
- Tadg in Eich Gil (died 1030), king of Connacht
- Tadhg mac Muirchertach (fl. 11th century), king of Moylurg
- Tadg mac Ruaidrí Ua Conchobair (died 1097), king of Connacht
- Tadhg mac Muireadach Mac Cárthaigh (died 1123), king of Desmond
- Tadhg Mor mac Maelruanaidh (died 1124), king of Moylurg
- Tadhg Ua Cellaigh (abducted 1145), king of Uí Maine
- Teige Ua Con Ceannainn (fl. 1152), king of Uí Díarmata
- Tadg Gláe macDiarmata Ó Briain (died 1154), claimed king of Desmond
- Tadhg Doichleach Ua Dálaigh (died 1181), Irish chief poet of Erinn and Alba
- Tadhg mac Conchobar Maenmaige Ua Conchobair (fl. 1210), Gaelic prince of Connacht
- Tadhg Cael Uisce Ó Briain (died 1269), tanist of Thomond
- Tadhg mac Diarmata (died 1281), king of Moylurg
- Tadhg Mór Ó hUiginn (died 1315), Irish poet
- Tadhg Ó Cellaigh (died 1316), king of Uí Maine
- Tadhg Óg Ó Cellaigh (died 1340), king of Uí Maine
- Tadhg na gcoar Ó Ruairc (died 1376), king of West Breifne
- Tadhg Ruadh Ó Cellaigh (died 1410), king of Uí Maine
- Tadhg na Mainistreach Mac Carthaigh Mór (died 1428), king of Desmond
- Tadhg Riabhach Ó Dubhda (died 1432), king of Ui Fiachrach Muaidhe
- Tadhg mac Tigernán Mór Ó Ruairc (died 1435), king of West Breifne
- Tadhg an Glemore Ó Briain (died 1438), king of Thomond
- Tadhg Ó Caiside (died 1450), Gaelic-Irish physician
- Tadhg Buidhe mac Tadhg Riabhach Ó Dubhda (died c. 1457), Gaelic lord
- Tadhg an Chomhaid Ó Briain (died 1466), king of Thomond
- Tadhg mac Diarmaid Ó Máille (died 1467), king of Umaill
- Tadhg Caech Ó Cellaigh (abdicated 1476), king of Uí Maine
- Tadhg mac Diarmata (died 1499), king of Moylurg
- Tadhg Liath Mac Carthaigh Mór (died 1503), king of Desmond
- Tadhg na Leamhna Mac Cárthaigh (died 1514), claimed king of Desmond
- Tadhg Ruadh mac Toirrdelbach (died 1553), king of Mide
- Tadhg Ó Cobhthaigh (fl. 1554), Irish poet
- Tadhg mac Brian Ballach Ó Ruairc (died 1560), king of West Breifne
- Tadhg mac Diarmata (died 1585), king of Moylurg
- Tadhg Olltach Ó an Cháinte (fl. c. 1601), Irish poet
- Tadhg mac Briain na Murtha Ó Ruairc (died 1605), king of West Breifne

=== Recent ===
- Tadhg Baker, Irish Gaelic footballer
- Tadhg Barry (1880–1921), Irish republican
- Tadhg Begley (born 1950), Irish chemist
- Tadhg Beirne (born 1992), Irish rugby union player
- Tadhg mac Dáire Mac Bruaideadha (1570–1652), Irish Gaelic poet and historian
- Tadhg Seamus Cleary, New Zealand Orthodox Jewish rabbi
- Tadhg Cooke, Irish contemporary musician
- Tadhg Corkery (born 1998), Irish Gaelic footballer
- Tadhg Crowley (1890–1969), Irish politician
- Tadhg Deasy (born 1998), Irish hurler
- Tadhg Mac Dhonnagáin (born 1961), TV personality
- Tadhg Ó Donnchadha (1874–1949), activist for the Gaelic League
- Tadhg Flynn (born 1983), Irish sportsperson
- Tadhg Furlong (born 1992), Irish rugby player
- Tadhg Haran (born 1991), Galway hurler
- Tadhg Hickey, Irish comedian
- Tadhg Dall Ó hUiginn (c. 1550 – c. 1591), Irish poet
- Tadhg Kennelly (born 1981), Gaelic and Australian Rules footballer
- Tadhg Leader (born 1992), US international rugby union & gridiron player
- Tadhg Mac Lochlainn (1907–1999), Irish local historian and activist
- Tadhg Óg Lynch (born 1973), Irish Gaelic footballer
- Tadhg Lyne (1930–2000), Irish Gaelic footballer
- Tadhg Purcell (born 1985), Irish soccer player
- Tadhg S. Seoighe (born 1857), Irish writer
- Tadhg Slattery (born 1971), South African Paralympic swimmer
- Tadhg Gaelach Ó Súilleabháin (1715–1795), Irish poet

== Fictional characters ==
- George MacDonald Fraser's 1977 novel Flashman's Lady features the comic character Daedalus Tighe, and John B. Keane's 1965 play The Field, has a character named Tadhg McCabe.

== See also ==
- List of Irish-language given names
- List of Scottish Gaelic language given names
