= Conchobar Maenmaige Ua Cellaigh =

Irish king

Conchobar Maenmaige Ua Cellaigh, 40th King of Uí Maine and 7th Chief of the Name, died 1180.

== Origins ==
Conchobar Maenmaige is agreed in all sources to have been king for forty years, so it appears he succeeded Tadhg Ua Cellaigh sometime after his abduction by an army from Munster in 1145. His succession meant the end of Síol Anmchadha's brief independence and overlordship of Uí Maine, and its dynasty would henceforth be confined to their own homeland.

Conchobar is stated in all the genealogies as being the son of Diarmaid, whose immediate descent is uncertain but is given as the son or grandson of Tadhg Mór Ua Cellaigh, who was killed at the Battle of Clontarf in 1014. However, it may actually mean that he was the son or grandson of the Tadhg who was abducted in 1145.

== Ecclesiastical work ==
John O'Donovan says of him that "he built O'Kelly's Church at Clonmacnoise, in the year 1167 … and is stated in some of the pedigrees to have built twelve churches in the territory of Moenmoy." His epithet probably refers to him being fostered, or at least raised, in Máenmag, a territory centered on what is now Loughrea.

== References in the Annals ==
Conchobar and Uí Maine are mentioned infrequently in the annals, reflecting the kingdom's subordinate status within the kingdom of Connacht. Some references include the following:

1145:The men of Munster proceeded with an army into Connaught; and they carried off Ua Ceallaigh, i.e. Tadhg, son of Conchobhar, lord of Ui-Maine, and slew Ruaidhri Ua Flaithbheartaigh.

1147:The battle of Ath-luain was gained over Domhnall, the son of Toirdhealbhach Ua Conchobhair, and the Ua-Maine, by the men of Teathbha, where the grandson of Amhalghaidh Ua Flainn and others were slain.

1155:Magh-Finn was preyed by the men of Teathbha, who plundered some of the Ui-Maine.

1163:A royal heir's feasting visitation was made by Niall, son of Muircheartach Ua Lochlainn, the son of the King of Ireland … He afterwards proceeded across Ath-Luain, into Connaught, with a force of twelve score men; and they feasted upon the Ui-Maine, but they were all killed by Conchobhar Ua Ceallaigh, Conchobar Maenmaige Ua Conchobair, and the Ui-Maine, through treachery and guile, except some deserters and fugitives; and Niall, son of Muircheartach Ua Lochlainn, was taken prisoner, and conducted in safety to his house, by advice of their meeting.

1167:A church was erected at Cluain-mic-Nois, in the place of the Dearthach, by Conchobhar Ua Ceallaigh and the Ui-Maine.

1170:A great fleet was brought upon the Sinainn, by Ruaidhri Ua Conchobhair, to plunder Munster. A predatory incursion was made by the Ui-Maine into Ormond, and a predatory incursion was made by the people of West Connaught into Thomond. They the Ui-Maine plundered Ormond on this occasion, and destroyed the wooden bridge of Cill-Dalua.

== The Battle of the Conors ==
A decline in the power of Ruaidrí Ua Conchobair initiated civil unrest in Connacht, from about 1177. The Uí Maine appeared to take advantage which cumulated in the Battle of the Conors, which took place at an unknown location, possibly within Máenmaige, sometime in 1180.

The victor was King Ruaidrí son, Conchobar Maenmaige Ua Conchobair, who had a palace at Dún Ló (Ballinasloe). The Four Masters relate that Conchobar Maenmaige Ua Cellaigh was killed, along with "his son Teige (Teige Tailtenn Ua Cellaigh); his brother Dermot; Melaghlin, the son of Dermot O'Kelly; and Teige, the son of Teige O'Conor.

== Descendants ==
Future kings of Ui Maine descended from Conchobar included:

- Domnall Mór Ua Cellaigh, died 1121
- Conchobar Ó Cellaigh, died 1268
- Donnchad Muimnech Ó Cellaigh, died 1307
- Gilbert Ó Cellaigh, died 1322
- Tadhg Ó Cellaigh, died 1316
- Tadhg Óg Ó Cellaigh, died 1340
- Tadhg Ruadh Ó Cellaigh, died 1410

Preceded by Tadhg Ua Cellaigh	King of Uí Maine c.1145–1180	Succeeded by Murrough Ua Cellaigh
