= Seán na Maighe Ó Cellaigh =

Irish chief, 16th century

Seán na Maighe Ó Cellaigh, lord of Uí Maine, fl. 1538-1584.

Ó Cellaigh was a descendant of Máine Mór, who founded Uí Maine. His gr-gr-gr-gr-gr-grandfather was Conchobar Ó Cellaigh (died 1268), a notable ruler of the kingdom. Seán lived in the parish of Creagh, Ballinasloe, and was described by historian Rev Jerome Fahey as:

an exceedingly influential petty-chief, holding a position astride the main highway into western Connacht. Morne na Maighe, his daughter (or sister?) was the wife of Domhnall Ó Madadhan, lord of Síol Anmchadha, the territory to the south of Clonmacnowen. ..in the sixteenth century [he] occupied Creagh castle.

As a result of the strategic importance of his lands, and their extensiveness, he was sought out by the Castle Administration in Dublin, who hoped to make him abandon the Gaelic Brehon laws and become a loyal subject of the crown. In an effort to secure his lands from other Ó Cellaighs, and to obtain the protection of the crown, Seán made a submission of Surrender and regrant in 1578, acknowledging the rule of Elizabeth I. For this he was rewarded with the legal title to his impressive list of property. The Fiants list them as:

all the manors and lands in Towyn alias Twunsrwra, Creagh, killynmalron, Behagh, Downe(lowe), Garwalle, Clonekyn, Balledonyllan, Tolrose, Keil, Garraf, Cowllery, Colleghcally, Cornesharrog, Lurce, Cillalachdan, Parklosnisker, Ballylough, and Belligh, Cos. Roscommon and Galway, also all rents and services of and upon Sleightowen, Sleight M'Donnell, Sleightloghlen, Cleindonoghmore, Sleight M'Brien, Sleight Mahon, Sleight Donell Clery, Sleightcossnyhown and Sleight Shane in the Province of Connacht. To hold for life, remainder to Rory ne Moy O'Kelly his son and heir, in tail male, remaincder to Shane ne Moy, another son of the said Shane and his heirs for ever. to hold in capite by the service of one knight's fee. Rent eight pounds seventeen shillings and ten pence. This grant to exonerate the grantee from any composition made with the lord deputy for the support of the Soldiers in the province – 26 July (1578)

Many of these lands later became the town of Ballinasloe and its environs; its castle was built and occupied by Edward Brabazon, 1st Baron Ardee. Seán's surrender to the laws of the Crown were part and parcel of the Surrender and Regrant policy pursued in sixteenth-century Ireland. It enabled Seán's family, in the eyes of the crown, to legally hold their lands according to the English legal system. However, much of this land was confiscated in the aftermath of the Irish Confederate Wars by the Cromwellian administration.

== See also ==
- Cellach Ó Cellaigh, lord of Aughrim
- Maelsechlainn mac Tadhg Ó Cellaigh
- Maelsechlainn Ó Cellaigh
