= Cairbre Crom =

Irish king

Cairbre Crom ("Cairbre the Hunched"; fl. c. AD 556) was an Irish king of the 6th century AD; he was 11th King of Uí Maine, in the west of Ireland.

== Background ==
Cairbre Crom is regarded as the last of the semi-historical kings of Uí Maine, his floruit estimated to be the second quarter of the 6th century.

He was a descendant of Máine Mór, who founded the kingdom of Uí Maine about the middle years of the 4th century. In the king-lists, he is recorded as the 10th (inclusive) in succession to Máine Mór.

== Genealogy ==
Cairbre is listed, along with Cairpri Mac Feithine and Nadsluaigh as the three sons of Feradhach mac Lughaidh. His pedigree is given thus:

Cairbre Crom mac Feradhach m. Lughaidh m. Breasal m. Dallán m. Maine Mór m. Eochaidh

== Descendants ==
Cairbre's notability is as the ancestor of almost all subsequent rulers of both Uí Maine and Síol Anmchadha, from the early historic period into the early modern era, a period of over one thousand years.

Cairpri Crom en mac lais, .i. Cormac. Da mac la Cormac, .i. Eogan Finn, ocus Eogan Buac. Eogan Finn, dia ta tuaiscert O Maine, ocus Eogan Buacc, a quo deiscert O Maine. Ceathrar mac la h-Eogan Finn, .i. Dicholla, ocus Fithchellach, ocus Maelanfaid, ocus Scannlan, ocus Scannall. Maelanfaid eisidi, a quo h-Ua Duibgind.
Cairpri Crom had one son, namely, Cormac. Cormac had two sons, viz., Eoghan Finn and Eoghan Buac. From Eoghan Finn, the Northern Ui Maine are descended, and from Eoghan Buac, the Southern Ui Maine. Eoghan Finn had four sons, namely, Dicholla, Fithchellach, Maelanfaidh, Scannlan, and Scannall. From this Maelanfaidh O'Duibhginn is descended.

== Uí Maine tuaiscert ocus deiscert ==
Cairbre Crom's descendant Anmchadh mac Eogan Buac (died c. 757), founded the kingdom of Síol Anmchadha, which was referred to as deiscert O Maine (southern Uí Maine). Families descended from Cairbre via Anmchadh include hUallacháin and Madden.

Eoghan Finn was the ancestor of King Tadhg Mór Ua Cellaigh (died 1014), from whom descend the Clann Ó Cellaigh or Kelly of County Galway, who were referred to as tuaiscert O Maine (northern Uí Maine).

== Finn and Buac ==
The two Eoghan's shared the same name because they likely had different mothers, hence the use of epithets. They were sons of Cormac mac Cairbre Crom.

Preceded by Marcán	King of Uí Maine; 556–?	Succeeded by Brenainn mac Cairbre
