= Ó Ceallaigh =

Irish family

- Parent house: Connachta
- Country: Ireland
- Founder: Máine Mór
- Current head: Robert Walter Joseph Charles O'Kelly
- Final ruler: Feardorcha Ó Cellaigh
- Titles: Kings of Uí Maine; Kings of Brega; Princes of Uí Maine; Count Palatine of the Holy Roman Empire; King-at-Arms of the Holy Roman Empire; Baron of Clankelly; Baron of Dungannon; Counts of Gallgh and Tycooly; High Treasurers of Connaught; Commander of the Connaught contingent of Brian Boru's Army

O'Kelly (Irish: Ó Ceallaigh [ˌoː ˈcal̪ˠəj]) is an Irish surname and the name of a number of distinct sept families in Ireland. The most prominent of these is the O'Kelly sept who were the chiefly family of the Uí Maine in Connacht. Another sept is that of the kingdom of Brega, descended from the Uí Néill. A more minor sept of O'Kelly was that descended from the Uí Máil; this sept is referred to in Irish as the Uí Ceallaig Cualann, in reference to the region of their origin, Cualu.

== O'Kelly of Uí Maine ==
The O'Kelly sept of Uí Maine is descended from Cellach mac Fíonachta, who lived in the 9th century. The first to bear the surname was Tadhg Mór Ó Ceallaigh, a grandson of the former who was slain in the Battle of Clontarf fighting on behest of his ally Brian Boru, king of Munster and high king of Ireland. According to historian C. Thomas Cairney, the O'Kellys came from the tribe of Ui Maine who in turn were from the Dumnonii or Laigin who were the third wave of Celts to settle in Ireland during the first century BC.

The earliest parts of the O'Kelly genealogy are contained in the Book of Hy Many, which was written in the latter half of the 14th century on behest of the then archbishop of Tuam, Muircheartach mac Pilib Ó Ceallaigh. Its compilation was the idea of William O'Kelly, a chief of Hy Many. The book is now kept in the Royal Irish Academy in Dublin.

The coat of arms of the O'Kelly of Uí Maine is as follows: "azure, a tower triple-towered supported by two lions rampant argent as many chains descending from the battlements between the lions' legs or" The motto is, "Turris fortis mihi Deus", which translates to "God is a Strong Tower to Me" or alternatively "God is my Tower of Strength".

== O'Kelly of Brega ==
The O'Kelly sept of Brega is descended from Cellach mac Congalach, a son of Congalach mac Conaing. This sept is considered one of the Four Tribes of Tara.

== O'Kelly of Cualu ==
The O'Kelly sept of Cualu is descended from Cellach Cualann mac Gerthidi, an Uí Máil king of Leinster in the late 7th through to the early 8th century.

== Castles and structures of the O'Kelly ==
- Garbally Castle
- Monivea Castle
- Gallagh Castle
- Clonbrock Castle
- Galey Castle
- Moyvannan Castle
- St. Mary's Abbey, Duleek
- Kilconnell Abbey
- Aughrim Priory
- Clontuskert Priory
- Aghrane (Now Castlekelly)

== See also ==
- Irish clans
- Cellach mac Fíonachta, eponymous ancestor of the O'Kelly of Uí Maine
- Cellach Cualann mac Gerthidi, eponymous ancestor of the O'Kelly of Cualu
- Uí Maine, the kingdom ruled by and dynasty which parented the O'Kelly of Uí Maine
- Kings of Uí Maine, a title dominated by the O'Kelly of Uí Maine from the 11th century
- Kelly (surname), for etymology, prevalence, and other origins of the surname 'Kelly'
