= Cellach mac Fíonachta =

Irish royal

Cellach mac Fíonachta, fl. 9th century, ancestor of Ó Ceallaigh (Kelly) of County Galway.

Cellagh was a grandson of king Ailell mac Inreachtach of Uí Maine (died 791/799). He never became king himself, but his grandchildren and their descendants, the Uí Ceallaigh, monopolised the kingship. The first Ó Ceallaigh ruler was Aodh Ua Cellaigh, who was killed at the battle of Clontarf, fighting on the side of Brian Boru. His last descendant to rule the kingdom was Feardorcha Ó Cellaigh (died c. 1611). Ó Ceallaigh, O'Kelly and Kelly is one of the most populous surnames in County Galway.
