= Aed Ua Cellaigh =

Aed Ua Cellaigh, 38th King of Uí Maine and 5th Chief of the Name, d. 1134.

== Background ==
Aed is one of a number of 11th-century kings of Uí Maine who is obscure. According to John O'Donovan, this seems to have been as a result both of historical confusion, and possibly genealogical re-ramification, where the pedigree of one branch of the Uí Maine was later treated as a king-list.

His place in the genealogical tree is uncertain, which reflects the tumult in the kingdom, following the long reigns of Tadhg Mór Ua Cellaigh (986-1014) and his son, Concobar mac Tadg Ua Cellaig (1014-1030). He is called Aed mac maic Taidhg h-Úi Cellaig but it is unclear which Taidhg is meant.

== The state of Uí Maine ==
By the 1130s, the kingdom was a vassal state of Tairrdelbach Ua Conchobair, King of Connacht.

One of the few, albeit indirect, references to the kingdom during Aed's reign was the battle of Caill Cobhtaigh in 1131:

The battle of Caill-Cobhthaigh was gained over the Sil-Muireadhaigh by the people of Upper Connaught, the former having come on a predatory excursion into Munster; and both parties having engaged through mistake, the Sil-Muireadhaigh left their spoils behind.

Upper Connacht in this sense means south Connacht, which comprised almost the entire of Uí Maine. A great slaughter of the O’ Conchoobair’s was made here by the O’ Cellaigh’s and again in 1135.

== Warfare in 1132 ==
In 1132, Máenmag, the westernmost section of the kingdom, was "plundered by Conchobhar ua Briain, who carried off many cows." He may have attended the conference of Abhall Chethernaigh in his capacity as a vassal, where "Toirdhealbhach Ua Conchobhair and Conchobhar Ua Briain, with the chiefs of the clergy of Connaught and Munster ... [made] a year's peace was made between them."

Aed died the same year died Muireadhach ua Flaithbheartach, King of Maigh Seóla. It is unknown if there were any connection between the two deaths - Muireadhach's kingdom bordered Maenmaige -, if as a result of ua Briain's attack, a succession dispute, or by other means.

Preceded by Dunchadh Ua Cellaig	King of Uí Maine ?–1134	Succeeded by Diarmaid Ua Madadhan
