= Aedh mac Brian Ó Cellaigh =

Aedh mac Brian Ó Cellaigh, King of Ui Maine, died 1467.

Ó Cellaigh appears to have been the only son of Brian Ó Cellaigh (died 1393) and Edwina inion Cathal Oge O Conchobair (died 1393). On their deaths within a few months of each other, he was apparently cared for by his grandfather, king Maelsechlainn Ó Cellaigh (died 1402) and after his death, by his uncle, Uilliam Ruadh, tánaiste of Ui Maine (died 1420).

Aedh came to power in 1424 as a compromise candidate. Donnchadh Ó Cellaigh, king from 1410 and another uncle of Aedh, had attempted to suborn the sons of Uilliam Ruadh, which led to his death in an ambush by them. As his supporters would not accept one of Uilliam Ruadh's sons as king, Aedh advanced his claim and was successful.

Preceded by Donnchadh Ó Cellaigh	King of Uí Maine; 1424–1467	Succeeded by Aedh na gCailleach Ó Cellaigh
