= Saint Grellan =

Irish saint

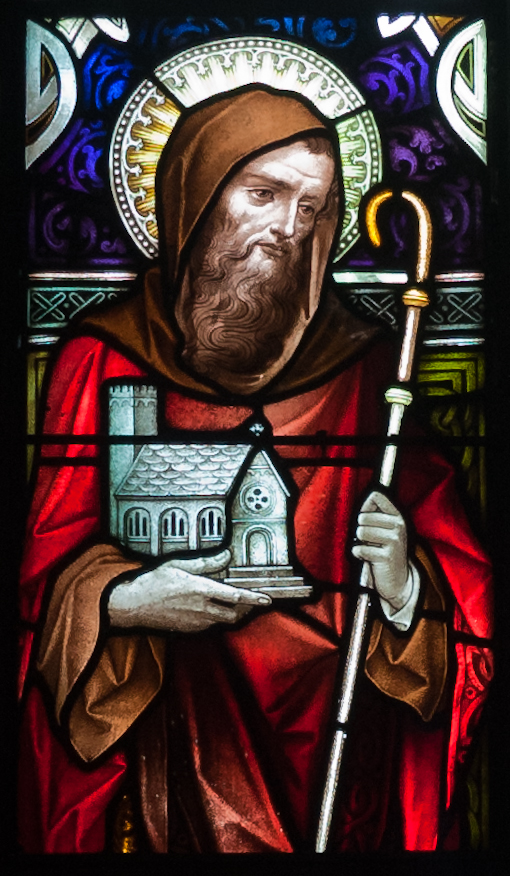
- Stained glass, St. Michael's Church, Ballinasloe, County Galway, Ireland
- Born: Ireland
- Died: 5th century
- Venerated in: Roman Catholic Church
- Feast: 10 November
- Patronage: Patron saint of the Kelly clan and of the parish of Ballinasloe, County Galway, Ireland

Saint Grellan is an Irish saint and patron saint of the Kelly and Donnellan of Uí Maine clans and of the parish of Ballinasloe, in County Galway, Ireland.

== Early life ==
According to the hagiography The Life of St. Grellan, Grellan lived during the 5th century time of Saint Patrick. Grellan was assigned a site to build a church at Achadh Fionnabhrach, by Duach Gallach, a King of Connacht. Duach Gallach granted Grellan the site to build his church after Grellan brought back to life by baptism Duach Gallach's stillborn son, Eoghan Sriabh.

Achadh Fionnabhrach has been ever since called Craobh Ghrealláin (Irish for 'the branch of Grellan'), named after the branch which king Duach and St. Patrick presented to St. Grellan, in token of possession. The king also ordered that seven garments should be given from every chieftain's wife as a tribute to the young cleric.

After this Grellan proceeded to the upper third of Connacht and continued to traverse the country but he eventually settled and established a church at Cill Cluaine (or Kilclooney, near present-day Ballinasloe) in Magh Seincheineoil, a territory occupied by the Firbolg and led by Cian d'Fhearaibh Bolg.

== Intervention in Fir Bolg-Colla da Chrioch battle ==
The area was invaded by the Gaelic tribe of Colla da Chrioch from the Kingdom of Oriel, led the semi-legendary figure Maine Mór who was accompanied by his father, Eochaidh Ferdaghiall, and his two sons Breasal mac Maine Mór and Amhalgaidh. His battalions descended on the territory and plundered the country. Acting as an intermediary, Grellan negotiated a peace between the parties. To consummate the peace, Cian d'Fhearaibh Bolg organised a feast to which Amlaff was invited but subsequently taken hostage.

Amlaff was now the bargaining power the Firbolgs held over the Gaels. While in captivity however, Amlaff managed offend a Firbolg official through a romantic entanglement with his wife. Amlaff was killed, and with him died the Firbolg's leverage against the Gaels. With the Gaels expecting a truce, Cian decided to catch them off guard with a surprise attack.

From the door of his church, Grellan became aware of the build-up of the Firbolg's weapons. As he was the guarantee between the two factions, this development put him in a precarious situation. Legend states that he prayed to God, who caused the Firbolgs to be swallowed into the earth at the bog of Magh Liach during battle with the Gaels.

Grellan subsequently granted the territory to Maine Mór and his people. The area became known as Uí Maine. The Uí Maine paid tribute to Grellan, who became the patron saint of the clans and families who descended from Maine Mór, including the Ó Ceallaigh (O'Kelly), Ó Madadhan (Madden), Ó Neachtáin (Naughton), Ó Domhnalláin (Donnellan), Ó Maolalaidh (Lally/Mullally) and Ó Fallamháin (Fallon) families.

== Crozier ==
St. Grellan's Crozier, or Bachall Grealláin was given to the Uí Maine with the territory, and was thenceforth borne in their standard on the battlefield. This crozier was in existence up to the early 19th century. The history of the Baċall Ġreallán is recounted by Patrick Egan in his history of "The Parish of Ballinasloe," from the time of the saint, during its time as a treasured relic of the Hy Many, until it was conveyed into the possession of Shane Crannelly as hereditary keeper of the relic, according to John O'Donovan writing in Ballinasloe in 1837. At this time, the Baċall was used as a talisman in depositions. The following year Thomas O'Curry arrived in the bally per the Ordnance Survey to learn that the Crozier of St. Ġreallán had been condemned and discarded. Crannelly's kin had inherited the staff; attended church; heard Father O'Connor's sermon against their family for charging fees to swear oaths on the Baċall; after which the treasure disappeared. Egan concludes the mystery thus "a treasured relic from the dawn of Christianity in Ireland, though handed down with loving care through thirteen centuries, was in the end put to base use, before finally disappearing from sight, perhaps forever."

== Use of name in modern times ==
St Grellan's Gaelic football club is named after Grellan, as is St Grellan's Terrace, a public housing estate, in Ballinasloe. St Grellan's Boys' National School, now Scoil an Chroí Naofa, was also named in his honour. Also in Ballinasloe, Grellan's Well is located in the townland of Tobergrellan (meaning Grellan's Well). The local branch of Conradh na Gaeilge (The Gaelic League) is named Craobh Ghrealláin in honour of the saint.

Although rare, Grellan is a boy's first name.

== Sources ==
- Egan, P. K. (1953). Ballinasloe: A Historical Sketch. Ballinasloe Tóstal Council.
- O'Donovan, John (1843). Tribes and Customs of Hy Many Commonly Called O'Kellys Country. Irish Archaeological Society.
- Stokes, Whitley (1895). The Martyrology of Gorman: Edited From A Manuscript In The Royal Library Brussels. London.
