= Seachnasach =

Seachnasach (died 711) was the 17th king of the Uí Maine.

Seachnasach's genealogy lists him as ten generations removed from Máine Mór, the founder of Uí Maine: "Sechnasaigh, mic Congail, mic Eogain, mic Comain, mic Brenaind Daill, mic Cairpri Feichine, mic Fearadaig, mic Luigdheach, mic Dallain, mic Bresail, mic Máine Móir." This includes him among the Clann Comain sept of the dynasty.

During his reign Cellach mac Rogallaig won the battle of Corran, and in 710, Dluthach mac Fithcheallach, possibly a son of the previous king, "was burned."

The annals merely report his death. No details are given.

Preceded by Fithceallach mac Flainn	King of Uí Maine; 691–711	Succeeded by Dluthach mac Fithcheallach
