= Diarmaid mac Tadgh Ua Ceallaigh =

9th century Irish king

Diarmaid mac Taidhg Ua Ceallaigh, 38th King of Uí Maine and 3rd Chief of the Name, died 1065.

== Biography ==
Upon the death of Concobar mac Tadg Ua Cellaig, a succession dispute appears to have arisen in the kingdom, with a confused succession. The king listed after Conchabar mac Tadg is simply called "mac Taidhg Ua Cellaigh", that is, "the son of Tadhg Ua Cellaigh." It is not clear which Tadhg this refers; Tadhg Mór Ua Cellaigh was killed at Clontarf in 1014.

An entry in the Annals of the Four Masters, sub anno 1065, identifies him as Diarmaid mac Taidhg Ua Ceallaigh:

The plundering of Cluain-mic-Nois by the Conmhaicni and Ui-Maine. Cluain-fearta was plundered by them on the day following. The chiefs who were there were Aedh, son of Niall Ua Ruairc, and Diarmaid, son of Tadhg Ua Ceallaigh, lord of Ui-Maine. Ua Conchobhair (Aedh) came against them, and defeated them, through the miracles of God, Ciaran, and Brenainn, whose churches they had plundered; and a bloody slaughter was made of them by Aedh; and they left their boats with him, together with the ship which they had carried from the sea eastwards, through the middle of Connaught, to the Shannon. Aedh Ua Ruairc escaped from this conflict, but he died without delay afterwards, through the miracles of Ciaran. Diarmaid, son of Tadhg Ua Ceallaigh, and his son, Conchobhar, were slain by the King of Connaught, Aedh Ua Conchobhair, before the end of a year.

He is listed as being succeeded by Dunchadh Ua Cellaig, who is presumed to have been his victorious rival.

Preceded by Concobar mac Tadg Ua Cellaig	King of Uí Maine; 1030?–unknown	Succeeded by Dunchadh Ua Cellaig
