= Clonmacnowen =

Barony in County Galway, Ireland

Clonmacnowen Clann Mhac nEoghain (Irish)
- Barony
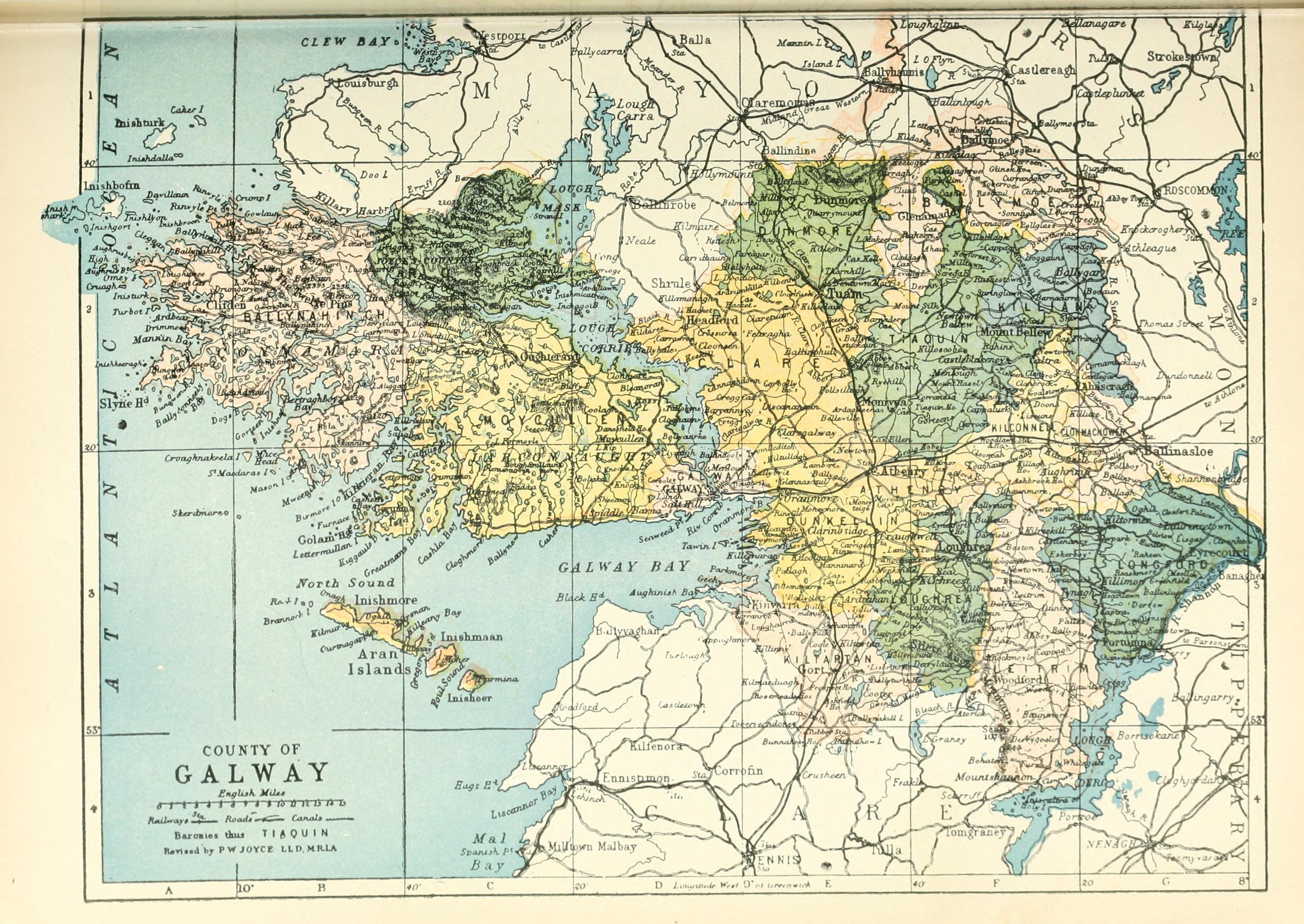
- Barony map of County Galway, 1900; Clonmacnowen is in the east, coloured pink.

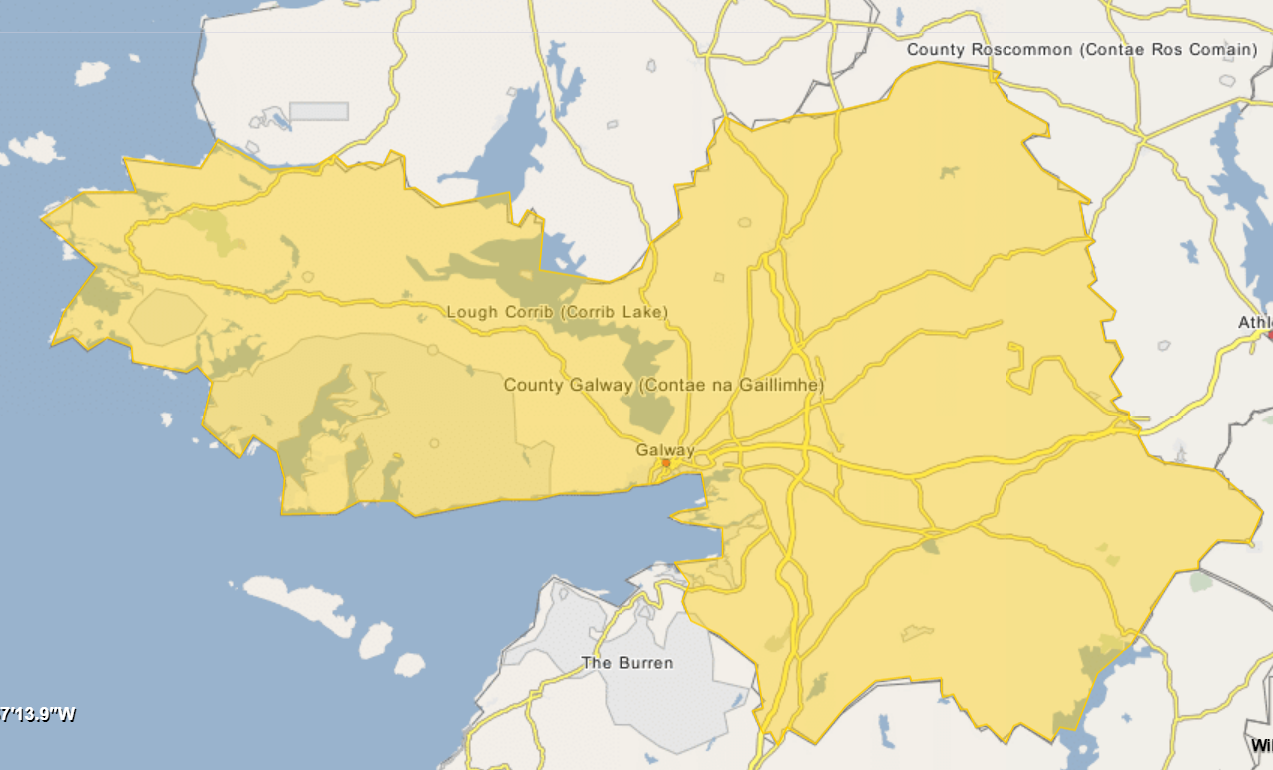
- Location within County Galway Location within Ireland
- Coordinates: 53°20′N 8°18′W
- Sovereign state: Ireland
- Province: Connacht
- County: Galway

Area
  - Total: 143.5 km^{2} (55.4 sq mi)

Clonmacnowen (Irish: Clann Mhac nEoghain; also Clonmacnoon) is a historical barony in eastern County Galway, Ireland.

Baronies were mainly cadastral rather than administrative units. They acquired modest local taxation and spending functions in the 19th century before being superseded by the Local Government (Ireland) Act 1898.

== History ==
The name derived from Irish Clann Mac nEoghain, "clan of the son's of Eoghan," referring to a son of Domnall Mór Ua Cellaigh, a king of Uí Maine who died in 1221.

The O'Muldoons (Ó Maoldúin) of Aughrim were ancient rulers of the area as chiefs of Eoghanacht Ani (Eóganachta of Aidhne).

By 1585 Seán na Maighe Ó Cellaigh was the owner of the area.

Clonmacnowen barony was created before 1672. It appears in the Down Survey (1665–66) as Clanemtoneen.

== Geography ==
Clonmacnowen is in the east of the county, where the River Suck forms the border with County Roscommon.

== List of settlements ==
Settlements within the historical barony of Clonmacnowen include:

- Ahascragh
- Ballinasloe
- Clontuskert
