= Murrough Ua Cellaigh =

Murrough Ua Cellaigh (died 1186) was the 41st King of Uí Maine and 8th Chief of the Name.

== Background ==
The previous king, Conchobar Maenmaige Ua Cellaigh, was killed in the Battle of The Connors in 1180 during an apparent rebellion against the king of Connacht.

Murrough was apparently a son of Tadhg Ua Cellaigh, who had been abducted and deposed in 1145 by Toirrdelbach mac Diarmata Ua Brien, King of Thomond.

== New revolts ==
Rebellion apparently began again when during 1183–1186, further warfare broke out among the Uí Conchobair, which resulted in Ruaidrí Ua Conchobair been forced to resign the kingship in favor of his son, Conchobar Máenmaige Ua Conchobhair.

Conchobar Máenmaige swiftly dealt with Ua Cellaig, whose territory compromised the largest single lordship within the kingdom. The annals record his death at the hands of Ua Conchobair, who was assassinated in 1189.

== Descendants ==
John O'Donovan stated in 1843 that Murrough's successor, Domnall Mór Ua Cellaigh (died 1221) was the ancestor of all the Ua Cellaigh's of Uí Maine extant by the 17th century.

This may simply mean that Murrough's family subsequently lost status and were no longer regarded a nobles, as his son, Aodh, was king when he died in 1206.

== Annalistic references ==
:1181: In that battle [Cath Criche Coirpre] also fell Hugh, the son of Conor O'Kelly ...[by] Flaherty O'Muldory, Lord of Tirconnell, [who] defeated the sons of the King of Connaught on the Saturday before Whitsuntide. The Annals state, "Sixteen of the sons of the lords and chieftains of Connaught were slain by the Kinel Connell, as well as many others, both of the nobles and the plebeians. They held the Connacians under subjection for a long time after this battle.

:1186: Murrough, the son of Teige O'Kelly, Lord of Hy-Many, was slain by Conor Moinmoy O'Conor.

Preceded by Conchobar Maenmaige Ua Cellaigh	King of Uí Maine; 1180–1186	Succeeded by Domnall Mór Ua Cellaigh
