= Dunchadh Ua Cellaigh =

Dunchadh Ua Cellaig was the 39th King of Uí Maine and 4th Chief of the Name, who died in 1074.

The Annals of the Four Masters note his death as follows:

Donnchadh Ua Ceallaigh, lord of Ui-Maine, was killed by his brother, Tadhg, grandson of Conchobhar Ua Ceallaigh, on the island of Loch-Caelain.

This would appear to make him a grandson of Concobar mac Tadg Ua Cellaigh, who ruled the kingdom from 1014 to 1030.

Preceded by Mac Tadhg Ua Cellaigh	King of Uí Maine; 1065–1074	Succeeded by Aed Ua Cellaigh
