= Cellach Ó Cellaigh =

Cellach Ó Cellaigh, Chief of the Sept, fl. late 16th century.

Cellach was a native of Aughrim, County Galway, and head of his branch of the Ó Cellaigh clan of Ui Maine. He was gr-gr-gr-gr-gr-gr-gr-gr grandson of Conchobar Maenmaige Ua Cellaigh, who was king in 1180.

His father, Domnall mac Aodh Ó Cellaigh, was married to Catherine Burke, a daughter of Ulick Finn of Clanricarde. Domnall's mother was Catherine Burke, daughter of Myler of Shrule. Cellach's great-grandfather, William mac Melaghlin Ó Cellaigh, was the first of the family to be associated with Aughrim.

He was married to Julia Ní Cellaigh, daughter of Tadg Dubh of Gallagh. Among their children were Feardorcha (died after 1611) and Hugh. Feardorcha Ó Cellaigh was the 79th and last king of Uí Maine and 43rd Chief of the Name. His descendants include the Counts and Countesses O'Kelly de Grallagh.

== Pedigree ==
An article of 1934 gave his pedigree as Cellach mac Domnall m. Aodh m. William m. Melaghlin m. William Buidhe m. Donoch Muimbreach m. Conchobhair m. Domnall m. Teige Tailtenn m. Conchobar Maenmaige.
