= Mughroin mac Sochlachan =

Mughroin mac Sochlachan (died 904) was 30th King of Uí Maine.

Mughroin mac Sochlachan is the first recorded king of Ui Maine since 844. He was the son of Sochlachan mac Diarmata and his brother's pedigree Murchadh mac Sochlachan (died 936) - written as Murchatan (from the diminutive Murchadhain) - is recorded in Leabhar Ua Maine as:

Murchatan, son of Sochlachan, son of Diarmait, son of Fergus, son of Murchadh, son of Dubh-da-Thuath, son of Daimin, son of Darnhdairi, son of Ailell, son of Coirbin, son of Aedh, son of Crimthann Cael, son of Lughaidh, son of Dallan, son of Breasal, son of Maine Mor.

A heading indicates that his sept were called the Clann Cremthainn. As his is the terminal name in the list, it may be that the Clann Cremthainn provided no more kings.

Preceded by Cathal mac Murchadh	King of Uí Maine ?–904	Succeeded by Sochlachan mac Diarmata
