= Duncadho mac Duib Da Tuadh =

Conall mac Fidhghal, 25th King of Uí Maine, died 782.

== Reign ==
Duncadho mac Duib Da Tuadh does not appear in the genealogies. His is the second of four or five short and highly obscure reigns.

This may indicate conflict, perhaps due to internal succession disputes or aggression from the expanding Uí Briúin under Artgal mac Cathail (died 791).

Preceded by Conall mac Fidhghal	King of Uí Maine; 784	Succeeded by Amhalgaidh
