= Cathal mac Ailell =

Cathal mac Ailell was 29th King of Uí Maine, Ireland (834–844).

== Kingship ==
Cathal's reign had begun by 834 but it is not stated how long he had held the kingship, nor if he was a direct successor of Cathal mac Murchadh

== Activities ==
His era was punctuated by regular Viking attacks up and down the Shannon, with nearby Clonmacnoise a regular target.

Cathal himself was not averse to attacking Clonmacnoise. The Annals of the Four Masters state that in 834:

Cluain Mic Nois was profaned by Cathal, son of Ailell, lord of Ui Maine, against the prior, Flann, son of Flaithbheartach, one of the Ui Forga of Munster, whom he cast into the Sinainn, and killed. The rights of seven churches were for this given to Ciaran, and a great consideration.

== Munster ==
His military activities seem to have included a rare incursion by the Ui Maine against Munster:

A defeat was given by Cathal, son of Ailill, to Feidhlimidh, son of Crimhthann, King of Caiseal, in Magh I, where many were slain; of which was said: "The Connaughtmen were mighty;/in Magh I they were not feeble;/Let any one inquire of Feidhlimidh,/whence Loch na Calla is named.

== Incursions ==
Raids by the Vikings did occur in Ui Maine itself:

843:An expedition by Tuirgeis, lord of the foreigners, upon Loch Ribh, so that they plundered Connaught and Meath, and burned Cluain Mic Nois, with its oratories, Cluain Fearta Brenainn, Tir Da Ghlas, Lothra, and many others in like manner.

== Death and descendants ==
Cathal's death is noted sub anno 844. No details are given. No descendants are named in Leabhar Ua Maine.

Preceded by Cathal mac Murchadh	King of Uí Maine; 834–844	Succeeded by Mughroin mac Sochlachan
