= Maelsechlainn mac Tadhg Ó Cellaigh =

Maelsechlainn mac Tadhg Ó Cellaigh, King of Uí Maine, Chief of the Name, was a leading participant in the Battle of Knockdoe, fl. 1499–1511.

== Family background ==
Maelsechlainn is believed to have been the son of a previous king, Tadhg Caech Ó Cellaigh, who died in 1476.

== Dispute with Clanricarde ==
Uí Maine bordered on the lordship of Clanricarde. In 1503, the then lord, Ulick Fionn Burke "gave a very great overthrow to O'Kelly at a party of the people of Conmaicne-Cuile, where a great part of the gallowglasses of both the Clann-Donnell and Clann-Sweeny were slain around their constables, and where Walter, the son of John Burke, a distinguished captain, was also slain in this conflict.

According to the Annals of the Four Masters, this resulted in a battle at Beal Ath na nGarbhan:

"The defeat of Bel-atha-na-ngarbhan was given by John Burke, the son of Ulick, son of Ulick, grandson of Rickard, Tanist of Clanrickard, to O'Kelly, in which fell Walter, the son of John, son of Thomas Burke, heir to the lordship of Conmaicne, and many others of the Clann-Donnell and Clann-Dowell, were slain."

Immediately after this, Burke seized and demolished Three castles belonging to Ó Cellaigh at Garbh Dhoire (known today as Garbally Castle), Monivea and Gallagh:

"Three castles belonging to O'Kelly, viz. Garbh-dhoire, Muine-an-mheadha, and Gallach, were demolished by Mac William Burke (i.e. Ulick the Third). O'Kelly, i.e. Mealsechlainn, complained to the Lord Justice (Fitzgerald) among other chiefs to acquire there support. the result of which was, defeat of Cnoc-Tuagh.

== Knockdoe ==
In the resulting Battle of Knockdoe, Ó Cellaigh fought on the side of Gerald FitzGerald, 8th Earl of Kildare, Lord Deputy of Ireland. As many as ten thousand are believed to have participated, with fully five thousand killed, mainly on the side of Clandricarde and Toirdhealbhach Donn Ó Briain. It was one of the bloodiest battle ever fought in Ireland.

Ó Cellaigh accompanied FitzGerald and lifted Burke's occupation of Galway and Athenry.

== Further references ==
The rest of Maelsechlainn's reign is obscure. The only event which indirectly refers to Uí Maine occurred in 1509, when "An army was led by O'Donnell into Lower Connacht, and brought the hostages of Lower Connacht with him to his house. On his death in 1511 he was succeeded by his son, Tadhg, who ruled for only two years. No further rulers of Uí Maine appear to descend from him.

== Family ==
Preceded by Donnchadh mac Breasal Ó Cellaigh	King of Uí Maine; 1499–1511	Succeeded by Tadhg mac Maolsheachlainn Ó Cellaigh
