= Conall mac Máele Dúib =

7th-century Irish monarch

Conall mac Máele Dúib (died 629) was the 14th King of the Uí Maine.

In his time the Uí Maine were allied and subject to the Ui Fiachrach Aidhne, a branch of the Connachta. They were ruled at this time by Guaire Aidne mac Colmáin (died 663) who ruled at the height of their power. Guaire attacked Munster but was defeated at the Battle of Carn Feradaig (Carhernarry, County Limerick) by the Munster king Faílbe Flann mac Áedo Duib (died 639). Conall was slain fighting on Guaire's side in this battle.

| Preceded by Aedh Buidhe | King of Uí Maine; 600/604–629 | Succeeded by Marcán mac Tommáin |
