= Tadhg Ó Cellaigh =

Irish regional king

Tadhg Ó Cellaigh, also known as Tadhg mac Domnall O Cellaigh (Anglicized: Teig O'Kelly) (died 10 August 1316) was King of Uí Maine and Chief of the Name.

== Background ==
Tadhg was one of five sons of Domhnall mac Conchobar mac Tadhg Taillten Ó Cellaigh, listed as

"Gilbert, King of Hy-Many, David, Tadhg Mor of the Battle of Ath na Righ, and Conchobhar, King of Hy-Many, and Aedh. Only two of them were by the same mother, viz., Tadhg and Conchobhar, and their mother was Abis, the daughter of O'Flainn O'Flynn."

== King of Ui Maine ==
Tadhg usurped his brother, Gilbert Ó Cellaigh in the wake of the war of 1315–16, which arose with the return of Ruaidhri mac Cathal Ó Conchobair from Ulster and his successful seizure of the kingship of Connacht from his cousin, Fedlim Ó Conchobair. Tadhg expelled Gilbert and allied with Ruaidhri, who

assembled the men of Connacht and Brefne, together with many gallowglasses, and penetrated to the midst of Sil Murray and the rest of Connacht, and forthwith burned the town of Sligo, Ballymote, the great castle of Kilcolman, Ballintober, Dunamon with its castle, Roscommon, Randoon and Athlone, as well as all the houses which lay on his route ... he took pledges and hostages of the rest of the Sil Murray and was made king on Carnfree. After this he remained for some time among them, ravaging every neighbour who was not submissive to him.

== Winter campaign ==
Tadhg accompanied Ruaidhri on his subsequent winter raids around Connacht, such as those at

Leith Luigne and the slopes of Sliab Gam, and in particular to Glenn Fathraim, where they killed many thousand cows and sheep and horses. At that time they stripped women and ruined children and lowly folk, and never within the memory of man were so many cattle, fruitlessly destroyed in one place.

Returning to Ui Maine, he proceeded to burn the castle of Aughrim, County Galway and plunder and burn Máenmag.

As a result, both of the warfare and severe climatic conditions, "Many afflictions in all parts of Ireland: very many deaths, famine and many strange diseases, murders, and intolerable storms as well."

== Moin Crinnoge ==
In February the two Ó Conchobairs fought each other at Tochar Mona Conneda (now Moin Crinnoge). Rudhri was defeated, and Fedlim "plundered the officers of Ruaidri O Conchobair and seized the kingship of Connacht from Assaroe (Assaroe Falls) to Slieve Aughty himself .. and took hostages of the Clann Cellaig." Tadhg now accompanied Fedlim, “the traitor” who switched sides and proceeded to wage war against his former allies, the Anglo-Irish of Connacht.

== Athenry ==
Fedlim's army, numbering as many as two thousand plus, seem to have assembled at Ballinasloe in late July or early August upon receiving the news that Sir William Liath de Burgh had returned from Scotland with Gallowglass mercenaries, and was assembling an army at Athenry to fight Fedlim.

Tadhg led the army of Uí Maine and Síol Anmchadha, along with their vassals, arriving at Athenry by 10 August 1316

The Second Battle of Athenry was fought on that day, and Fedlim's army soundly defeated, with "Tadc O Cellaig, king of Ui Maine [falling] with him, together with twenty-eight men who were entitled to succeed to the kingship of Ui Maine." Fedlim and his household bodyguard were slaughtered at what is now known as Kingsland, a plateau due east of, and overlooking, the town.

== Final hours ==
Tadhg, however, survived the battle, and with a single bodyguard, hid in the woods outside Athenry. In the evening, John Husse, the town executioner and his servant were among the many local men surveying the battlefield for survivors and loot. Tadhg stepped out of the woods and made a pledge to Husse that, if he would switch sides and be his man, Tadhg would guarantee him power and position. Husse's servant agreed with Tadhg and urged his master to acquiesce.

In reply, Husse unsheathed his sword and beheaded his servant on the spot. He then engaged Tadhg's servant, defeated him, and fought Tadhg in a one-on-one sword fight. He ran Tadhg through and beheaded him and his bodyguard. Husse returned to Athenry, receiving reward from his lord, Rickard de Bermingham, for the three heads. Tadhg's head, along with that of King Fedlim, was surmounted on the twin towers of the main gate of Athenry, as the most dangerous of the defeated Irish. Their heads are featured to this day in the coat of arms of Athenry.

== Descendants ==
His son Tadhg Óg Ó Cellaigh, briefly gained the kingship of Ui Maine in 1339 but was successfully opposed by William Buidhe Ó Cellaigh, who captured him. Tadhg Óg was injured and subsequently died of his wounds.

Tadhg's family are described in Leabhar Ua Maine as:

Tadhg of the Battle of Ath na Righ, the son of Domhnall, had three sons, viz., Donnchadh, Tadhg, and Conchobhar. Tadhg, had three sons, viz., Tadhg Óg, Donnchadh Euadh, and a second Tadhg, surnamed Ruadh. Conchobhar, son of Tadhg, had three sons, viz., Ruaidhri, Eoghan, and Aedh.

Preceded by Gilbert Ó Cellaigh	King of Uí Maine; 1315–1316	Succeeded by Conchobar mac Domnall Ó Cellaigh
