= Charles O'Kelly =

Irish soldier and writer

Charles O'Kelly (1621–1695) was an Irish soldier and writer.

O'Kelly was born at Screen or Clonlyon, Aughrim, County Galway, son of John O'Kelly and Isma Hill, daughter of Sir William of Ballybeg, County Carlow. He was educated at St. Omer. He first saw action in Ireland in 1642.

He inherited Aughrim in 1674, and was elected member of parliament (MP) for County Roscommon in 1689. He again fought, this time as a colonel, in the Williamite War in Ireland, serving at Aughrim and Limerick. He later authored Macariae Excidium, or the Destruction of Cyprus, containing the Last Warr and Conquest of that Kingdom, which contains the only account of the battle of Aughrim by a native of the area.

== See also ==
- Feardorcha Ó Cellaigh, fl. 1584 – after 1611
- Tadhg Mór Ua Cellaigh, fl. 986–1014

== Bibliography ==
- Macariae Excidium, or the Destruction of Cyprus, containing the Last Warr and Conquest of that Kingdom, 1692
- Macariae Excidium, ed. by Count Plunkett and Rev. Edmund Hogan, SJ, called The Jacobite War &c. [this edn. substitutes real historical names, Tyrconnell, etc.] (Sealy, Bryers, & Walker 1894; 2nd ed. also 1894), 12o, paper.
