= Aed Ó Cellaigh =

Aed Ó Cellaigh, King of Uí Maine and Chief of the Name, died 1318.

Preceded by Gilbert Ó Cellaigh	King of Uí Maine; 1322–?	Succeeded by Ruaidri Ó Cellaigh
