= Sochlachan mac Diarmata =

Sochlachan mac Diarmata (died 909) was 31st King of Uí Maine.

The annals record:

M865.11 Huppan, son of Cinaedh, heir presumptive of Connaught, was burned in an ignited house, by Sochlachan, son of Diarmait.

U867.5 Abán son of Cinaed, heir designate of Connacht, was killed with fire by Sochlachán son of Diarmait.

M908.5 Sochlachan, son of Diarmaid, lord of Ui-Maine, died in religion.

U912.5 Sochlachán son of Diarmait, king of Uí Maini, ended his life in religion.

He was pre-deceased by this son - Mughroin, lord of Ui-Maine. And succeeded by his other son Murchadh mac Sochlachan.

Preceded by Cathal mac Ailell	King of Uí Maine ?–909	Succeeded by Murchadh mac Sochlachan
