= Fithceallach mac Flainn =

Irish King

Fithceallach mac Flainn (died 691) was the 16th King of the Uí Maine.

Little seems to be known of his reign, and the annals merely report his death. No other details are given.

Preceded by Marcán mac Tommáin	King of Uí Maine; 653–691	Succeeded by Seachnasach
