= Diarmaid Ó Cellaigh =

Diarmaid Ó Cellaigh, King of Uí Maine and Chief of the Name, died c.1349.

Preceded by Tadhg Óg Ó Cellaigh	King of Uí Maine; 1340–c.1339	Succeeded by William Buidhe Ó Cellaigh
