= Duach mac Dallán =

Duach mac Dallán was the 6th king of the Irish kingdom of Uí Maine, around the 5th- or 6th-century.

John O'Donovan remarked that "Dallan, who was also a brother of Fiachra Finn, was prince of Hy-Maine for eleven years, when he was mortally wounded and afterwards drowned."

Preceded by Dallán mac Breasal	King of Uí Maine c.487?– c.503?	Succeeded by Lughaidh mac Dallán
