= Aedh Buidhe =

King of Uí Maine
- Reign: 537 – 600
- Predecessor: Brenainn mac Cairbre
- Successor: Conall mac Máele Dúib

Aedh Buidhe (died 600, "Áed the Yellow") was the 13th King of the Uí Maine.

The early historic era of the kingdom of Uí Maine is fragmentary. It is first mentioned in the annals in 537. Likewise the succession of its kings. King Brenainn mac Cairbre died in 597 and it is presumed that Aedh Buidhe succeeded him.

The Annals of the Four Masters, based on earlier sources, state that Aedh was killed on the same day that King Áed Sláine of Brega killed Áed Rón mac Cathail of the Ui Failghe, whose death is however set at 604.

The following verse commemorated the events of that day.

Great was the bloody condition/of all the Irish kings/Aedh Slaine of the valorous host/Aedh Roin, and Aedh Buidhe.

He appears to have been succeeded by Conall mac Máele Dúib, who died in 629, although some place Brenainn mac Cairbre's death in 601.

Preceded by Brenainn mac Cairbre	King of Uí Maine; 537–600	Succeeded by Conall mac Máele Dúib
