= Muirgus mac Domnaill =

Irish king (died 985)

Muirgus mac Domnaill (died 985) was 35th King of Uí Maine.

Muirgus's time is not noted in the Irish annals, the only direct reference is to his death in 985, which states he was slain. No further details are given.

Preceded by Geibennach mac Aedha	King of Uí Maine; 973–985	Succeeded by Tadhg Mór Ua Cellaigh
