= William Ó Cellaigh =

William Ó Cellaigh, King of Ui Maine, died 1487.

Upon the death of Aedh na gCailleach Ó Cellaigh in 1469, the Ui Maine elected two kings, ruling Iar Ui Maine (west) and Airthir Ui Maine (east) respectively. They were Tadhg Caech Ó Cellaigh of Airthir, and William in the west. Upon the retirement of Tadhg in 1476, Uilliam became king of all Ui Maine, installing his brother, Donnchadh, as tánaiste in Airthir.

In 1487 he was deposed and died in chains sometime that year.

Preceded by Tadhg Caech Ó Cellaigh; William Ó Cellaigh	King of Uí Maine; 1476–1487	Succeeded by Maelsechlainn mac Aedh Ó Cellaigh

== See also ==
- Kings of Uí Maine
