= Conchobar Ó Cellaigh =

Conchobar Ó Cellaigh, 43rd King of Uí Maine and 10th Chief of the Name, died 1268.

== Historical background ==
Uí Maine during his reign fell away from subordinate status to the Kings of Connacht and regained something of its former independence, but at the cost of encastellation and settlement under Richard Mór de Burgh (died 1242) and his son, Walter de Burgh, 1st Earl of Ulster (died 1271).

There are only the most indirect references to Uí Maine in the annals, perhaps reflecting the kingdom's reduction into less significance or its domination by the de Burgh dynasty. The Ui Maine would go on to displace the de Burgh’s of Connacht from power in the next few centuries.

== Family ==
Conchobar is stated in the Book of Lecan to have been the eldest son of Domnall Mór Ua Cellaigh. His brother, Tomás Ó Cellaigh, was Bishop of Clonfert.

Ó Cellaigh's mother was Dubh Cobhlaigh Ní Briain, a daughter of King Domnall Mór of Thomond (died 1194).

Conchobar had three wives; the daughter of Ó hEidhin (anglicised as Hynes) of Aidhne; Derbhforgaill, daughter of Ó Loughlin of the Burren; Eadaoin, daughter of Mac Con Mara (MacNamara) of Thomond.

By Ní hEidhin he had two sons,

- Domnall Ó Cellaig (died 1295), later king of Uí Maine and ancestor to the O'Kelly of Belagllda.
- Murchadh.

By Derbhforgaill Ní Loughlin he had

- Donnchad Muimnech Ó Cellaigh (died 1307)
- Maine Mor Ó Cellaigh (died 1271)

By Eadaoin Ní Con Mara he had

- Cathal na Finne
- Cairbre
- Maurice

Preceded by Domnall Mór Ua Cellaigh	King of Uí Maine; 1221–1268	Succeeded by Maine Mor Ó Cellaigh
