= Tadhg Ruadh Ó Cellaigh =

Tadhg Ruadh Ó Cellaigh was the king of Uí Maine and a Chief of the Name. He died in 1410.

Preceded by Conchobar an Abaidh Ó Cellaigh	King of Uí Maine; 1403–1410	Succeeded by Donnchadh Ó Cellaigh
