= Dunchadh ua Daimhine =

Irish king (died 780)

Dunchadh ua Daimhine, 23rd King of Uí Maine, died 780.

== Reign ==
During his era, Dunchadh's kingdom endured border conflicts initiated by the Connachta, by the successive kings Donn Cothaid mac Cathail (died 773), Flaithrí mac Domnaill (died 777) and Artgal mac Cathail (died 791). The first notable incident was the battle of Achadh Liag (in Cluain Acha Liag, now called 'Killeroran' - the Uí Maine inauguration site) in 770:

The battle of Achadh Liag was fought between the Ui Briuin and Ui Maine, wherein the Ui Maine were defeated.

This was part of a wider conflict which would see the Uí Briúin Ai of the Connachta become the dominant power in the province, which would henceforth bear their name, Connacht.

Ui Maine would, by the end of the following century, remain mainly independent but it marked the beginning of several centuries of being accorded the status of second or third-class state, by kingdoms such as the Kings of Connacht, the Earl of Ulster, the Clanricarde and finally the Earl of Clanricarde. None of them would be noted to any Kingship in Ireland as long as the Ui Maine.

It was also in these years that Thomond west of the River Shannon would become annexed to Munster by the ancestors of the Dál gCais. It remains part of that province to this day.

Preceded by Aedh Ailghin	King of Uí Maine; 767–780	Succeeded by Conall mac Fidhghal
