= Ruaidri Ó Cellaigh =

Ruaidri Ó Cellaigh (died 1339) was King of Uí Maine and Chief of the Name.

Preceded by Aed Ó Cellaigh	King of Uí Maine c. 1332–1339	Succeeded by Tadhg Óg Ó Cellaigh
