= Murchadh mac Sochlachan =

Murchadh mac Sochlachan (died 936) was 32nd King of Uí Maine.

In 918, there occurred "A great slaughter was made of the Ui-Maine at Grian but the circumstances are not stated.

He was a son of Sochlachan mac Diarmata (died 909), and brother of Mughroin mac Sochlachan and his pedigree - written as Murchatan (from the diminutive Murchadhain) - is recorded in Leabhar Ua Maine as:

Murchatan, son of Sochlachan, son of Diarmait, son of Fergus, son of Murchadh, son of Dubh-da-Thuath, son of Daimin, son of Darnhdairi, son of Ailell, son of Coirbin, son of Aedh, son of Crimthann Cael, son of Lughaidh, son of Dallan, son of Breasal, son of Maine Mor.

A heading indicates that his sept were called the Clann Cremthainn. As his is the terminal name in the list, it may be that the Clann Cremthainn provided no more kings.

Preceded by Sochlachan mac Diarmata	King of Uí Maine ?–936	Succeeded by Murchadh mac Aodha
