= Maine Mor Ó Cellaigh =

Maine Mor Ó Cellaigh (died 1271) was King of Uí Maine and 10th Chief of the Name.

Uí Maine during his reign fell away from subordinate status to the Kings of Connacht and regained something of its former independence, but at the cost of encastellation and settlement under Richard Mór de Burgh (died 1242) and his son, Walter de Burgh, 1st Earl of Ulster (died 1271).

There is only the most indirect references to Uí Maine in the annals, perhaps reflecting the kingdom's reduction into less significance or its domination by the de Burgh dynasty.

Preceded by Conchobar Ó Cellaigh	King of Uí Maine; 1268–1271	Succeeded by Domnall Ó Cellaigh
