= Corkery =

Corkery may refer to:

- Corkery (surname), a surname
- Corkery, Missouri, an extinct town in Missouri, United States
- Corkery, Ontario, a community in Ottawa, Canada
