= Brenainn mac Cairbre =

Brenainn mac Cairbre, 12th King of Uí Maine, died 597 or 601.

Brenainn is only the second king of Uí Maine listed in the Irish annals. Confusion surrounds his obit, with a five-year variation given. He was succeeded by Aedh Buidhe who died in 600.

Events which occurred in Ireland during these years included:

- 595 – death of Alithir, Abbot of Clonmacnoise.
- 596 – Suibhne mac Colman Beg, King of Mide, was slain by Áed Sláine.
- 597 – battle of Sleamhain, in Mide.
- 597 – death of King Uatu mac Áedo of Connacht
- 601 – battle of Slaibhre in Leinster

Preceded by Maine mac Cearbhall	King of Uí Maine unknown– 597/601	Succeeded by Aedh Buidhe
