= Conchobar mac Domnall Ó Cellaigh =

Conchobar mac Domnall Ó Cellaigh (died 1318) was King of Uí Maine and Chief of the Name.

Preceded by Tadhg Ó Cellaigh	King of Uí Maine; 1316–1318	Succeeded by Gilbert Ó Cellaigh
