= Conchobar an Abaidh Ó Cellaigh =

Conchobar an Abaidh Ó Cellaigh, king of Uí Maine, Chief of the Name, died 1403.

Following a lengthy period of stable rule from c.1349 to 1402 under the kings William Buidhe and his son, Maelsechlainn, Conchobar's reign was the first of two successive short reigns, though it is unclear if succession disputes were the cause of it.

Conchobar was a son of Maelsechlainn, and nickname an Abaidh because he was an abbot at an Ui Maine monastery. The Annals of the Four Masters report his death as follows:

Conor Anabaidh, the son of Melaghlin O'Kelly, Lord of Hy-Many, the Serpent of his tribe, and of all the Irish people, died, after Extreme Unction and Penance, and was interred in the monastery of St. John the Baptist in Tir-Many.

Preceded by Maelsechlainn Ó Cellaigh	King of Uí Maine; 1402–1403	Succeeded by Tadhg Ruadh Ó Cellaigh
