= Donnchadh mac Eamonn Ó Cellaigh =

16th century Irish king

Donnchadh mac Eamonn Ó Cellaigh, king of Uí Maine, Chief of the Name, fl. 1536 – after 1557.

== Reign ==
Donnchadh's reign saw the final subjugation of Ui Maine to the Clanricarde's, after two centuries of virtual independence and seizure of lands conquered by the Burkes in the 13th century. The Clanricarde married the daughter of Ó Madadhan of Síol Anmchadha – a vassal of the Ui Cellaigh within their kingdom.

Ó Madadhan's residence was Portumna, which became the new home of the Clanricardes, who abandoned the town of Loughrea.

== Legacy ==
=== Warfare and loss of independence ===
The Mac an Iarla wars, which flared up regularly between c. 1544 and 1583, greatly disturbed and occasionally devastated the Ui Maine. Some notable English lords seemed to be defeated by the Irish, up to the onset of the Nine Years' War (Ireland). By the early 17th century much of its political independence was destroyed and it fell fully within the ambit of the Anglo-Irish administration based in Dublin.

=== Chiefs of the Name ===
The title 'King of Ui Maine' was “outlawed” in favor of the less threatening 'Captain of his Nation'. In the 17th century this became modified by the Gaelic-Irish to Chief of the Name. The clan, in common with dozens of other Gaelic-Irish, and some Anglo-Irish families, has had am asserted "senior" figure, selected by primogeniture, called The Ó Cellaigh (or, The O'Kelly), ever since. The current Ó Cellaigh is Count Walter Lionel O'Kelly of Gallagh and Tycooly, Count of the Holy Roman Empire; he lives in Dublin.

Preceded by Domnall mac Aedh na gCailleach Ó Cellaigh	King of Uí Maine; 1536 – after 1557	Succeeded by Ceallach Ó Cellaigh
