= Amhalgaidh =

Amhalgaidh, 26th King of Uí Maine, died 784.

== Reign ==
Amhalgaidh may be the most obscure of some four or five short-reigned kings of Ui Maine. Not even his ancestry is known.

This may indicate conflict, perhaps due to internal succession disputes or aggression from the expanding Uí Briúin under Artgal mac Cathail (died 791).

Preceded by Conall mac Fidhghal	King of Uí Maine; 786	Succeeded by Ailell mac Inreachtach
