= Dub Dá Leithe mac Tomaltach =

Dub Dá Leithe mac Tomaltach, 28th King of Uí Maine, died 816 .

Dub Dá Leithe mac Tomaltach is one of the two kings of Ui Maine listed in the obits sub anno 816. Dub Dá Leithe is listed as "chief of Ui Maine (?)" in the Annals of Ulster, with apparently a question concerning his rule.

The Annals of the Four Masters, for the same year, mention Cathal mac Murchadh. It may be that one was a short-lived successor to the other.

Preceded by Ailell mac Inreachtach	King of Uí Maine ?–816	Succeeded by Cathal mac Murchadh
