= Aonghus mac Úmhór =

Mythical Irish king

Aengus mac Umor (modern spelling: Aonghus mac Úmhór) was a mythical Irish king.

The Fir Bolg of Connacht were ruled by King Aonghus mac Úmhór. Dubhaltach Mac Fhirbhisigh states that Aonghus led his people, the Tuath mhac nUmhoir, to the coast of Galway Bay and the Aran Islands, after being driven out by warfare with "Clann Chuian and the kindred of the Gaoidhil (Gaels)". The fortress of Dún Aonghasa on Inishmore, which legend states he built, is still called after him. O'Rahilly places these events in the 2nd century BC.

Aonghus's son, Conall Caol, settled with his people in what was then the kingdom of Aidhne.

== See also ==
- Cian d'Fhearaibh Bolg
- Senchineoil
