= Conall mac Fidhghal =

King of Uí Maine (died 782)

Conall mac Fidhghal (died 782) was the 24th King of Uí Maine.

== Reign ==
Connall's era is very obscure. Following two relatively lengthy reigns under Aedh Ailghin (died 767) and Dunchadh ua Daimhine (died 780), his kingship marked the start of some four or five short reigns.

This may indicate conflict, perhaps due to internal succession disputes or aggression from the expanding Uí Briúin under Artgal mac Cathail (died 791).

Preceded by Dunchadh ua Daimhine	King of Uí Maine; 780–782	Succeeded by Duncadho mac Duib Da Tuadh
