= ARBH =

ARBH may refer to:

- Adolescent Radioactive Blackbelt Hamsters
- Arbh, a surname such as belonged to Finn mac Arbh, slain in the battle of Bealach Cro under the reign of Aedh Ailghin
- Army of the Republic of Bosnia and Herzegovina, more commonly shortened as ARBiH
