= Tadhg Caech Ó Cellaigh =

Tadhg Caech Ó Cellaigh was a King of Ui Maine within Ireland, who retired in 1476.

Upon the death of Aedh na gCailleach Ó Cellaigh in 1469, the Ui Maine elected two kings, ruling Iar Ui Maine (west) and Airthir Ui Maine (east) respectively. They were Tadhg Caech Ó Cellaigh of Airthir, and William Ó Cellaigh in the west. Upon the retirement of Tadhg in 1476, Uilliam became king of all Ui Maine, installing his brother, Donnchadh, as tánaiste in Airthir.

Preceded by Tadhg Caech Ó Cellaigh; William Ó Cellaigh	King of Uí Maine; 1469–1476	Succeeded by Maelsechlainn mac Aedh Ó Cellaigh

== See also ==
- Kings of Uí Maine
