= Maelsechlainn mac Aedh Ó Cellaigh =

Maelsechlainn mac Aedh Ó Cellaigh, king of Uí Maine, Chief of the Name, died 1489.

Preceded by William Ó Cellaigh	King of Uí Maine; 1488–1489	Succeeded by Conchobar Óg mac Aedh Ó Cellaigh
