= Feradhach mac Lughaidh =

Feradhach mac Lughaidh, 8th king of Uí Maine, fl. 6th-century.

John O'Donovan remarked that "Feradhach, the son of Lughaidh, was prince of Hy-Many for twenty-four years, when he was slain by his successor."

Preceded by Lughaidh mac Dallán	King of Uí Maine c.517?– c.541?	Succeeded by Maine mac Cearbhall
