= Lughaidh mac Dallán =

Lughaidh mac Dallán, 7th king of Uí Maine, fl. 5th-century/6th-century.

John O'Donovan remarked that "Lughaidh, the son of Dallan, and brother of Duach, was prince or chief ruler of Hy-Many for fourteen years, when he died a natural death.

Preceded by Dallán mac Breasal	King of Uí Maine c.503?– c.517?	Succeeded by Feradhach mac Lughaidh
