= Ailell mac Inreachtach =

Ailell mac Inreachtach, 27th King of Uí Maine, died 791/799.

Ailell was the son of king Inreachtach mac Dluthach. No other details appear of him.

Preceded by Amhalgaidh	King of Uí Maine; 786–791/799	Succeeded by Dub Dá Leithe mac Tomaltach
