= Marcán =

Marcán, 10th King of Uí Maine, died 556.

Marcán was the first of two semi-historical kings who reigned subsequent to that of the first attested king of Uí Maine, Maine mac Cearbhall.

Marcán appears to be unique among the dynasty in that he is not recorded in the genealogies, nor are there any families known to claim descent from him.

Only one other king of Uí Maine, Marcán mac Tommáin (slain 653), bore his name, but their relationship is uncertain.

Preceded by Maine mac Cearbhall	King of Uí Maine c.541–556	Succeeded by Cairbre Crom
