= Fiachra Finn =

Fiachra Finn, 3rd king of Uí Maine, fl. 5th-century.

John O'Donovan remarked that "Fiachra Finn, the son of Bresal (No. 2), seventeen years, when he was treacherously slain by his brother Maine Mall. Fiachra Finn is styled in the poem, ‘a tower in conflict and battle.’ He is the ancestor of the O'Naghtens and O'Mullallys or Lallys."

Preceded by Breasal mac Maine Mór	King of Uí Maine c.437?– c.445?	Succeeded by Connall Cas Ciabhach
