= Cathal mac Murchadh =

Cathal mac Murchadh was 29th King of Uí Maine, died 816.

Cathal mac Murchadh was killed at "The battle of Rath Fhearadh by the chieftains of Ui Briuin, Diarmaid, son of Tomaltach, and Maelcothaigh, son of Fogartach in Dealbhna Nuadhat, between the Suca and the Sinnainn, where Cathal and many other nobles along with him were slain."

He is one of two kings of Ui Maine listed in the obits sub anno 816. Dub Dá Leithe mac Tomaltach is listed as "chief of Ui Maine (?)" in the Annals of Ulster, with apparently a question concerning his rule. Cathal is listed as king in the above extract from the Annals of the Four Masters. The confusion may arise from one been a short-lived successor to the other.

Preceded by Dub Dá Leithe mac Tomaltach	King of Uí Maine; 794–816	Succeeded by Cathal mac Ailell
