= Cian d'Fhearaibh Bolg =

Cían d'Fhearaibh Bolg, last King of the Senchineoil of Magh Senchineoil, now in County Galway, Ireland.

== Background ==
Cían is identified as the king of Magh Senchineol, home to the Senchineoil people, who were said to be of Fir Bolg origin, a population group from Irish mythology. It was asserted by T. F. O'Rahilly that the Fir Bolg may have been inspired by both the historical Iverni and Laigin, although this is not widely accepted in Irish scholarship, these historical kindreds having no convincingly demonstrated association with the mythological one in the surviving corpus, beyond linguistic speculation. Related may have been the Fir Domnann, who settled in what is now Connacht.

The Fir Bolg of Connacht were ruled by King Aonghus mac Úmhór. Mac Fhirbhisigh states that Aonghus led his people, the Tuath mhac nUmhoir, to the coast of Galway Bay and the Aran Islands, after being driven out by warfare with "Clann Chuian and the kindred of the Gaoidhil (Gaels)." The fortress of Dún Aonghasa on Inishmore, which legend states he built, is still called after him. O'Rahilly places these events in the 2nd century BC.

Aonghus's son, Conall Caol, settled with his people in what was then the kingdom of Aidhne.

== Grellan and the Uí Maine ==
The Christian missionary, Grellan, established a church at Cill Cluaine (near present-day Ballinasloe) in Magh Seincheineoil. Cían is said to have "waited on the saint at the place."

In this time the kingdom was invaded by a branch of the Airgíalla, led by Eochaidh Ferdaghiall, his son Maine Mór and grandsons Amhalgaidh and Breasal mac Maine Mór. According to Leabhar Ua Maine:

These fine hosts suddenly and heroically proceeded in well arranged battalions, with their flocks and herds, from Clochar Mac Daimhin to Druim Clasach, which is called Tir-Many, situated between Loch Ri and the river Suca. They plundered the country, and despatched messengers to Cían, lord of the country, to Magh Seincheineoil, and they told him that the descendants of Colla da Chrioch had come to demand tribute and territory from him. And Cian was terrified by these sayings. He assembled his great forces, and their number was thirty hundred, who bore shield and sword and helmet.

Mac Fhirbhisigh quotes a quatrain which describes the army:

Aoinfhear as gach lios amach/as eadh do thigeadh le Cian/a Maigh Sencheneiol, ni breug/dech cceud are fhichit ceud sgiath.

The translation says:

One man out of every fort/is what went forth with Cían/from Magh Seincheineoil, no falsehood/ten hundred and thirty hundred shields.

== Truce ==
To prevent battle and further bloodshed, Grellan negotiated a peace between the Airgíalla and Cían. To celebrate the occasion, Cían organised a feast at which Amhalgaidh was forcibly taken hostage.

Cían intended to use Amhalgaidh to force Maine Mor and his followers to withdraw. However, Amhalaidh became involved with the wife of one of Cían's officers, who killed him. With Amhalaidh dead, Cían chose to mount a surprise attack on the Airgíalla.

However, Grellan became aware of the Fir Bolg's army, which, as the guarantor of the truce, placed him in danger from both sides. Grellan,

from the door of his church, perceived these arms, and these great hosts, he raised his two hands to God, being apprehensive that his guarantee would be violated, and he obtained his request from God, for the great plain was softened and made a quagmire under the feet of Cían and his people, so that they were swallowed into the earth; and the place received the name of Magh Liach, i.e. the plain of sorrow, from the sorrow of the heroes, who were thus cut off by the holy cleric.

== Aftermath ==
Grellan became the patron saint of the Uí Maine, as the descendants of Maine Mor were later called.

Mac Fhirbhisigh wrote of him "Although this Cían was notable at that time, there is scarcely any little thing known of the flower of his kindred because of the intermingling of the family of the Collas with it until now. Thus it was with many more of their septs in Ireland, who were exterminated, whether it was something else or their ill-will towards Clann Mhilidh that [caused] God to will their punishment. However, although they have gone, I do not forbear to remember every band of them which is brought to my attention in poem or in book." He locates their territory in northern Ui Maine, while listing five other branches located between the east shore of Lough Corrib to the River Suck, as well as the adjoining area of County Clare.

The Senchineoil are mentioned only in a very few, scattered references. It is unclear if they were the same people as the Soghain, or if both races were Fir Bolg.
