= Connall Cas Ciabhach =

Connall Cas Ciabhach, 4th king of Uí Maine, fl. 4th-century/5th-century.

Preceded by Fiachra Finn	King of Uí Maine c.454?– c.476?	Succeeded by Dallán mac Breasal
