= Donnchad Muimnech Ó Cellaigh =

King of Uí Maine

Donnchad Muimnech Ó Cellaigh (died 1307) was King of Uí Maine and Chief of the Name.

Uí Maine during his reign fell away from subordinate status to the Kings of Connacht and regained something of its former independence, but at the cost of encastellation and settlement under Richard Mór de Burgh (died 1242) and his son, Walter de Burgh, 1st Earl of Ulster (died 1271).

1307. The greater number of the English of Roscommon were slain by Donough Muimhneach O'Kelly, Lord of Hy-Many, at Ath-easgrach-Cuan, where Philip Muinder, John Muinder, and Main Drew, with many others whose names are not mentioned, were killed. Dermot Gall Mac Dermot, Cormac Mac Kaherny, and the sheriff of Roscommon, were taken prisoners; but they were afterwards set at liberty, and they made peace recte restitution for the burning of the town by Edmund Butler. Donough O'Kelly, after he had performed these exploits, died; and his was not the death of one who had lived a life of cowardice, but the death of a man who had displayed prowess and bravery, and bestowed jewels and riches.

Preceded by Domnall Ó Cellaigh	King of Uí Maine; 1295–1307	Succeeded by Gilbert Ó Cellaigh
