= Kilclooney =

Townland and Civil Parish in County Galway, Ireland

Coordinates: 53.342°N 8.273°W

Kilclooney or Kilcloony (Irish: Cill Chluaine) is a townland and civil parish in County Galway, Ireland. It is one of three civil parishes in which Ballinasloe is located. It is regarded as the place in which Saint Grellan settled and established a church, which has since been replaced by the currently-standing, run-down church.
