= Lackagh =

Civil parish in County Galway, Ireland

Coordinates: 53.368°N 8.858°W

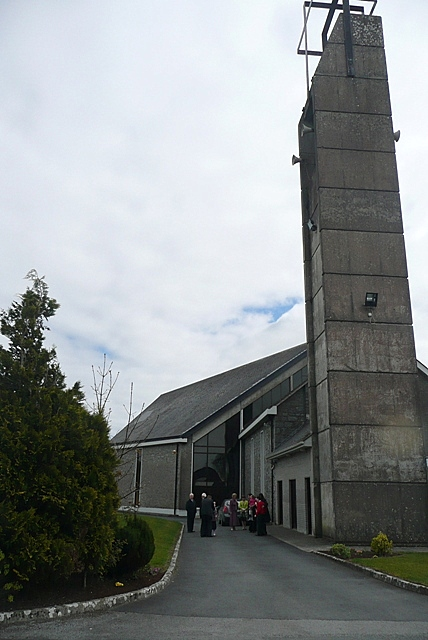
Lackagh church

Lackagh (Irish: Leacach) is a civil parish in County Galway, Ireland. It is approximately halfway between Galway city and Tuam (east of a line between these two towns) and bounded by the parishes of Athenry, Abbeyknockmoy, Corofin, Annaghdown and Claregalway. The River Clare runs through the centre of the parish.

It was once part of the kingdom of the Soghain of Connacht. Cregmore and Turloughmore lie within the parish.

== See also ==
- List of towns and villages in the Republic of Ireland
- Battle of Knockdoe (1504)
- River Clare
