= Corkery (surname) =

Corkery is a surname. Notable people with the surname include:

- Briege Corkery (born 1986), Irish camogie player and Gaelic footballer
- Colin Corkery, Irish Gaelic footballer
- Daniel Corkery (Irish republican) (1883–1961), Irish politician
- Daniel Corkery (author) (1878–1964), Irish politician, writer and academic
- David Corkery (born 1972), Irish rugby union player
- Dillon Corkery (born 1999), Irish cyclist
- James Corkery (1889–1964), Canadian long-distance runner
- KC Corkery (born 1983), American tennis player
- Matthew Corkery (born 1965), Australian rugby league player
- Niall Corkery, Irish Gaelic footballer
- Pam Corkery (born 1956), New Zealand journalist, broadcaster and politician
- Stella Corkery (born 1960), New Zealand artist
- Tadhg Corkery (born 1998), Irish Gaelic footballer
- Tim Corkery (born 2001), Irish rugby union player
