= Taig =

Ethnic slur

Taig, and (primarily formerly) also Teague, are anglicisations of the Irish-language male given name Tadhg, used as ethnic slurs for a stage Irishman. Taig in Northern Ireland and the west of Scotland is most commonly used as a derogatory term by loyalists to refer to Irish Catholics.

Tadhg was once so common as an Irish name that it became synonymous with the typical person, with phrases like Tadhg an mhargaidh ("Tadhg of the market") akin to "the man on the Clapham omnibus" or "average Joe". In the late 1680s, the satirical Williamite ballad Lillibullero includes the line: "Ho brother Taig hast thou heard the decree?" Conversely, the Irish-language name is used defiantly in a Jacobite poem written in the 1690s: "Who goes there" does not provoke fear / "I am Tadhg" is the answer given. In 1698, John Dunton wrote a mocking account of Ireland, titled Teague Land – or A Ramble with the Wild Irish.

Although the term has rarely been used in North America, a notable example of such use was when future Founding Father and lawyer John Adams successfully defended the soldiers responsible for the 1770 Boston Massacre by pleading to the jury that they were being attacked by:

... most probably a motley rabble of saucy boys, negros and molattoes, Irish Teagues and outlandish jack tarrs. —And why we should scruple to call such a set of people a mob, I can't conceive, unless the name is too respectable for them?

In the context of segregation in Northern Ireland and sectarianism in Glasgow, the term "Taig" is used as a derogatory term for a Roman Catholic, used by Northern Irish Protestants and Ulster loyalists. In this sense, it is used in a similar way to the word Fenian, but is more ethnic in terms of abuse against people of Gaelic descent than "Fenian", which more commonly signifies Irish republican. Extremist loyalists have also used slogans such as "Kill All Taigs" (KAT) and "All Taigs Are Targets" in graffiti.

In Scotland, "Tim" is sometimes used as an alternative to "Taig" ("Tadhg" is usually translated as "Timothy" and shortened to "Tim" in English).
