= Gilbert Ó Cellaigh =

Gilbert Ó Cellaigh (died 1322) was King of Uí Maine and Chief of the Name.

Preceded by Domnall Ó Cellaigh	King of Uí Maine; 1307–1315	Succeeded by Tadhg Ó Cellaigh

Preceded by Conchobar mac Domnall Ó Cellaigh	King of Uí Maine; 1318–1322	Succeeded by Aed Ó Cellaigh
