= Concobar mac Tadg Ua Cellaigh =

Concobar mac Tadg Ua Cellaig, 37th King of Uí Maine, and 2nd Chief of the Name, died 1030.

There was formerly some confusion as to the succession of the kingdom following the death of Tadhg Mór at Clontarf in 1014. A poem, apparently wrote to praise Eoghan Ó Madadhan (died 1347) and his ancestors, though they never held the rule of that kingdom.

The annals state that Concobar mac Tadg Ua Cellaig was King of Uí Maine and was killed in battle by the men of Tethbae in 1030. His brother Diarmaid was killed in 1065. Both men were sons of the previous chief.

| Preceded by Tadhg Mór Ua Cellaigh | King of Uí Maine; 1014–1030 | Succeeded by Mac Tadhg Ua Cellaigh |
