= Aedh Ailghin =

Aedh Ailghin (died 767) was the 22nd King of Uí Maine and buried at Lullymore Monastery, Co. Kildare.

== Reign ==
Only one major event of Aedh's reign appears in the annals, sub anno 751:

The battle of Bealach Cro was gained by Crimhthann over the Dealbhna of Ui Maine, in which was slain Finn mac Arbh, Lord of Dealbhna, at Tibra Finn, and the Dealbhna were slaughtered about him. The Ui Maine were contending with them for the cantred between the Suca (the River Suck) and the Sinainn (the River Shannon), for this was called the cantred of Dealbhna.

Aedh dead at Battle of Allen, in 722:

Then Áed Laigen son of Fidchellach, king of Úí Maine Connacht, was defeated and fled, saying to his sons, ‘Do not leave me, sons; your mother will be better disposed towards you if you take me with you.’ ‘They will not take you,’ said the Laigin. It was then that Áed Laigen, king of Úí Maine, was slain.

However, the sons of Áed Laigen, in the company of Áed Alláin son of Fergal, reached Lilcach, where Modichu son of Amargein and the pious Foreigner were. It was then that the Úi Néill and Connachta dug the rampart of the church, and they were in the guise of clergy, and it was thus that they were saved through a miracle of the saints, so that the friendship of the Úí Néill and Connachta is in that church from that time forth; wherefore Áed Ailáin sang:

We did not find on earth a place which would be as smooth as Almu; after the battle we did not reach a place which would be as bright as Lilcach.

Other Ui Maine kings killed in the battle under the banner of the southern Uí Néill, included:

Fidgal mac Fidchellaich, of Cairpre Cruim

Flaithemail mac Dlúthaig, of Cairpre Cruim, from thom descend Clann Flaitheamail

Duibdil úa Daimíne and his brothers, of Clann Cremthainn

The identity of Crimthann the Warlike is uncertain. The only person of the name wielding any authority at the time was Crimhthann mac Reachtghal, who was Abbot of Clonfert from 757 to 761. However, academic assumptioin is that it is in fact a reference to Clann Cremthainn branch of the Ui Maine.

Aedh's reign coincided with that of Donn Cothaid mac Cathail (d. 773), last of the Uí Fiachrach Muaidhe Kings of Connacht. Who defeated the Ui Briun at the battle of Druim Robaig

Preceded by Inreachtach mac Dluthach	King of Uí Maine; 750–767	Succeeded by Dunchadh ua Daimhine
