= Dallán mac Breasal =

Dallán mac Breasal (fl. 5th-century) was the fifth king of Uí Maine.

== Biography ==
John O'Donovan remarked that "Conall Cas-ciabhach, i.e. of the curled tresses, was prince of Hy-Maine, twenty-two years, when he was slain. He was brother of Fiachra Finn."

Preceded by Connall Cas Ciabhach	King of Uí Maine c.476?– c.487?	Succeeded by Duach mac Dallán
