= Tadhg S. Seoighe =

Tadhg S. Seoighe (19 April 1857 – 17 March 1943) was an Irish writer.

Seoighe was born in Ballyloughane, outside Galway city. His parents were Patrick Joyce and Bridget Keane. He had one brother, James and two sisters, Mary and Ellen.

Irish was the spoken language in Ballyloughane at the time, and the oral tradition, or bealoideas was an important part of everyday life. Tadhg went to the Old Monastery School in Market Street, and later, attended night classes in The Mechanics Institute. In September 1877 he joined the Royal Irish Constabulary. He trained in the Phoenix Park, and was stationed in different parts of Dublin. He retired as a sergeant in 1908 and returned to Galway.

In 1923, he began to write for newspapers and journals, actively encouraged by Father Martin O'Donnell, the author of Oileain Arainn. He wrote prodigiously, mostly in the Irish language, for various periodicals such as The Gael, An Stoc, The Standard, The Irish Press, etc. Many of his stories were based on memories of the past and the folklore and the pisreogs (Irish, superstitions) of the area around Ballyloughane and the sea.

His papers have been donated to The Hardiman Library in University College, Galway. He is buried in a family plot in Teampall Cemetery in Mervue, Co. Galway.

== Select bibliography ==
- Scealta Cois Teallaigh, Dublin, Fallons, 1929.
