= Maelsechlainn Ó Cellaigh =

King of Uí Maine

Maelsechlainn Ó Cellaigh, king of Uí Maine, Chief of the Name, died in 1402.

Maelsechlainn was a son of the previous king, and continued the kingdom's expansion, and rise of prestige, that William Buidhe had initiated. The borders were expanded as land lost in the 13th century to the Earl of Ulster was regained at the expense of war with the Burke of Clanricarde, At one stage, Ó Cellaigh's power extended to within a few miles of Loughrea, the caput of the Clanricarde.

| Preceded by William Buidhe Ó Cellaigh | King of Uí Maine; 1381–after 1402 | Succeeded by Conchobar an Abaidh Ó Cellaigh |
