= Domnall Mór Ua Cellaigh =

Irish medieval regional king

Domnall Mór Ua Cellaigh, 42nd King of Uí Maine and 9th Chief of the Name, died 1221.

== Reign ==
Domnall Mór's reign is one of the most obscure of the High Medieval kings of Uí Maine. The kingdom is only indirectly mentioned in the annals. While the Ua Conchobair succession dispute regularly devastated Connacht and the Anglo-Irish began raids and settlement west of the Shannon. In 1189 Conchobar meanmaige Ua Conchobair was slain by an unknown culprit.

== Descendants ==
Domnall Mór is notable for the claim, noted by John O'Donovan as recorded in a Trinity College Dublin pedigree of the Mac Eochadha (Keogh) family, that he was the common ancestor of all the extant branches of the Uí Cellaigh Uí Maine. This may simply mean that, while other lines had lost lands and status and became peasants, most of his bloodline continued to exist among the gentry after the collapse of Gaelic Ireland.

It further states that he was the ancestor of all subsequent kings and chiefs, bar four.

Domnall Mór married Dubh Cobhlaigh Ní Briain, a daughter of King Domnall Mór of Thomond (died 1194).

Children of Domnall Mór and Dubh Cobhlaigh included:

- - Eoghan, the third son, became ancestor of the Clann Maince Eoghain, who gave their name to the barony of Clanmacnowen, and whose chiefs were semi-independent vassals of the senior Ua Cellaigh.
- - Diarmaid, their youngest son, became ancestor of the Mac Eochadha (Keogh) family of Maigh Finn (now Taughmaconnell). This surname is still found in County Roscommon and County Galway.

Preceded by Murrough Ua Cellaigh	King of Uí Maine; 1186–1221	Succeeded by Conchobar Ó Cellaigh
