= William Ua Cellaig =

William Ua Cellaig (modern Irish: Uilliam Buidhe Ó Cellaigh), also known as William Boy O'Kelly or William Buí Ó Ceallaigh, was Taoiseach of Uí Maine and Chief of the Name. He died c.1381.

On Christmas Day, 1351, Ó Ceallaigh invited poets, artists, and writers from across Ireland to a feast in his home at Galey Castle near Knockcroghery, County Roscommon. The feast became famous for the hospitality Ó Ceallaigh showed to his guests, and "Cuireadh fáilte Uí Cheallaigh romhainn" (literally: We got the O'Kelly welcome) remains a description for hospitable hosts in contemporary Irish.

Preceded by Diarmaid Ó Cellaigh	King of Uí Maine c.1349–c.1381	Succeeded by Maelsechlainn Ó Cellaigh
