= Maine mac Cearbhall =

Maine mac Cearbhall, great-grandson of Niall of the Nine Hostages, died 531 or 538. The brother of Diarmait mac Cerbaill, future High King of Ireland. Maine's great-grandfather was Niall of the Nine Hostages, making Maine an Ui Neill. Maine's descendants according to the Book of Ballymote were called Cenel Maine.

== Career ==
Prof. Byrnes writes "In 538 Diarmait mac Cerbaill's brother Maine (the coincidence of his name is quite fortuitous) was defeated and slain at the battle of Claenloch near Gort in south Galway. According to the Annals of Tigernach, a Clonmacnoise compilation, he was slain by the king of the Ui Fiachrach Aidne, Goibnenn mac Conaill, while attempting to claim the homage of the Ui Maine Connacht. In the later king-lists Maine mac Cerbaill is called king of Uisnech. In the minds of compilers this meant that he was over-king of the Southern Ui Neill, but this is probably an anachronism, especially since Tuathal Maelgarb is supposed to have been high-king of Tara at this date."

== Book of Ballymote ==
Fergus cerrbel .ui. mc. leis .i. Fiach a quo .H. Fhiaich Maine a quo Cenel Maine & Garban a quo .H. Garban la firu Breagh. Diarmaid (.i. mc. Fergusa Cerbel) .iiii. mc. leis .i. Colman mor, Colman beg, Aedh slane, Maelduin o fuilet Muinter Maelduin i Cluain mc. Nois.

== A.D. 531 ==
The Annals of the Four Masters (who list his death sub anno 531), state:

Cath Claonlocha h-i c-Cenel Aodha ria n-Goibhneann, taoisioch Ua Fiachrach Aidhne, airm in ro marbhadh Maine, mac Cerbhaill, ag cosnamh geillsine Ua Maine Connacht.

The battle of Claenloch, in Cinel Aedh, by Goibhneann, chief of Ui Fiachrach Aidhne, where Maine, son of Cearbhall, was killed, in defending the hostages of Ui Maine of Connaught.

Claenloch is now thought to be Coole Lough, a turlough located at Coole Park, County Galway.

Preceded by Feradhach mac Lughaidh	King of Uí Maine unknown– 531/537	Succeeded by Marcán
