= Domnall Ó Cellaigh =

13th-century King of Uí Maine

Domnall Ó Cellaigh, King of Uí Maine and Chief of the Name, died 1295.

Uí Maine during his reign fell away from subordinate status to the Kings of Connacht and regained something of its former independence, but at the cost of encastellation and settlement under Richard Mór de Burgh (died 1242) and his son, Walter de Burgh, 1st Earl of Ulster (died 1271).

Preceded by Maine Mor Ó Cellaigh	King of Uí Maine; 1271–1295	Succeeded by Donnchad Muimnech Ó Cellaigh
