= Tadhg Ua Cellaigh =

Tadhg Ua Cellaigh, 39th King of Uí Maine and 6th Chief of the Name, abducted 1145.

== References in the Annals ==
Tadhg and Uí Maine are mentioned infrequently in the annals, reflecting the kingdom's subordinate status within the kingdom of Connacht. Some references include the following:

:1136: The fleet of Murchadh Ua Maeleachlainn on the Sinainn and on Loch Ribh; the Sil-Muireadhaigh, with their king, i.e. Conchobhar, son of Toirdhealbhach, and the Ui-Maine, with their lord, i.e. Tadhg Ua Ceallaigh, came, and both left hostages with Murchadh.

:1137: All the province of Connacht was laid waste, from Drobhaeis to the Sinainn and to Echtghe (Slieve Aughty), and the people themselves were driven into Iar Connacht (West Connacht).

:1140: The successor of Patrick made a visitation of Connacht for the first time, and obtained his full tribute, and their churches were adjusted to his jurisdiction by Toirdhealbhach Ua Conchobhair and the chieftains of Connacht, and the successor of Patrick and his clergy left a blessing on the king and the chieftains of Connacht.

:1142: A predatory excursion was made by Conchobhar, son of Toirdhealbhach, and the Ui-Maine, upon the Cinel-Forgo, and carried off countless kine.

:1144: Domhnall Ua Ceallaigh was killed by the three sons of the grandson of Conchobhar Ua Ceallaigh, namely, Donnchadh, Amhlaeibh, and Lochlainn.

== Abduction and disappearance ==
In 1145, an army of Munster invaded Connacht. The Four Masters state they carried off Ua Ceallaigh, i.e. Tadhg, son of Conchobhar, lord of Ui-Maine, and slew Ruaidhri Ua Flaithbheartaigh. No more is heard of Tadhg, who was succeeded by Conchobar Maenmaige Ua Cellaigh soon after. Conchobar appears to have been his son or grandson.

Preceded by Diarmaid Ua Madadhan	King of Uí Maine; 1135–c.1145	Succeeded by Conchobar Maenmaige Ua Cellaigh
