= Four Tribes of Tara =

The Four Tribes of Tara was an alliance of powerful clans that consisted of the O'Harts, O'Kelly's, O'Connolly, and the O'Regan. The princes of Tara were also styled princes of Brega, consisting of territory in the modern day counties Meath, Louth and Dublin, and containing the districts around the ancient Royal Seat of Tara, Trim, Navan, Athboy, part of Dublin north of the Liffey. The Four Tribes were major defenders of Ireland against Viking invasions during the 8th and 9th centuries.
