= Feardorcha Ó Cellaigh =

Feardorcha Ó Cellaigh, 79th and last king of Uí Maine, 43rd Chief of the Name, fl. 1584-after 1611.

== Family background ==
Ó Cellaigh was a native of Aughrim, County Galway. His father, Cellach Ó Cellaigh married Julia Ní Cellaigh, daughter of Tadg Dubh of Gallagh. He had a brother, Hugh, who died without male issue.

== Land disputes ==
Many of Ó Cellaigh's lands had been devastated during the Mac an Iarla wars, and subsequently disturbed during the Nine Years' War (Ireland). By 1589, he was on more favorable terms to seek from the Earl of Ormond a lease of thirty-one years of the lands his family had occupied during the previous three centuries. He succeeded Aded mac Donnchadh by 1593.

In 1596 the earl alleged breach of contract, with the result that Fearcorcha laid waste to the land. He made a peace payment in 1607 to Ormond and Thomond on payment of two hundred and twenty pounds to Thomond for this war. He died sometime after 1611 and his heirs held their estates till the aftermath of the Irish Confederate Wars (1641–1653).

== Family ==
Feardorcha Ó Cellaigh married firstly to Catherine MacHugo, with whom he shared four daughters. He married secondly Julia Níc Cochláin, daughter of Seán na Scuab Mac Cochláin. Among their children was Maolsheachlainn Ó Kelly, Esq., who married Honora Burke of Cloughrourke, and had two children, Teige and Brian.

He was related to Colonel Charles O'Kelly (1621–1695) who fought in the Irish Confederate Wars and at the Battle of Aughrim, and was the author of a book on the Williamite Wars, The Conquest of Cyprus.

== Kelly of Uí Maine ==
- Kings of Uí Maine
- Máine Mór, founder of the kingdom of Uí Maine, fl. 4th-century A.D
- Tadhg Mór Ua Cellaigh, (1014) King of Uí Maine and first Chief of the Name
- Peter Kelly (sports administrator) (GAA)
- Richard Kelly (The Tuam Herald)
- Mary Eva Kelly
- Mian Kelly
- Patrick Kelly (US Army officer)
- Rita Kelly
- Thomas J. Kelly (Irish nationalist)

Regnal titles
Preceded by Aedh mac Donnchadh Ó Cellaigh	King of Uí Maine; 1593–after 1611	Vacant
Preceded by Aedh mac Donnchadh Ó Cellaigh	Ó Cellaigh/Kelly; 1593–after 1611	Succeeded by Conor Ó Cellaigh
