= Máine Mór =

Máine Mór mac Eochaidh (fl. 4th century) was the founder of the kingdom of Uí Maine.

== Biography ==
Máine Mór descended from Colla da Chrioch of Oirghialla/Oriel, Máine Mór, his father Eochaidh Ferdaghiall and his two sons Breasal and Amhlaibh, travelled to Connacht to seek new lands. They attacked the lands of the local king, Cian d'Fhearaibh Bolg, king of the Fir Bolg (see Soghain and Senchineoil), amongst the other minor tribes and with the intervention of Grellan, settled in the land. In return, the Uí Maine would evermore pay tribute to Grellan, who became the dynasty's patron saint.

Maine Mór reigned for fifty years, and is the ancestor of the following families: Lally, hUallacháin, Madden, Kelly, Fallon, Neachtain, Threinfhir, and others.

He was succeeded by his surviving son, Breasal mac Maine Mór, who ruled for thirty years.

== Notable descendants ==
- Tadhg Mór Ua Cellaigh (d. 1014), the first O'Kelly
- Madudan Reamhar Ua Madadhan, Chief of Síol Anmchadha, 1069-1096
- Giolla Finn Mac Uallacháin King of Síol Anmchadha, 1096-1101
- Seán Ó Maolalaidh (fl. 1419–1480), Chief of the Name
- Feardorcha Ó Cellaigh, 68th and last king of Uí Maine, 43rd Chief of the Name, fl. 1584-after 1611
- Samuel Madden (1686-1765), author
- Thomas Arthur, comte de Lally, baron de Tollendal (January 1702 – 1766), French general
- Thomas J. Kelly (Irish nationalist) (d. 1908), Irish revolutionary and USA soldier
- Arthur Colahan (died 1952), composer of the song "Galway Bay"

== See also ==
- Kings of Uí Maine, c.450-after 1611

Regnal titles
New title	King of Uí Maine c. 357?– c. 407?	Succeeded by Breasal mac Maine Mór
