= Tadhg Corkery =

Irish Gaelic footballer (born 1998)

Personal information
- Native name: Tadhg Ó Corcora (Irish)
- Born: 1998 (age 27–28) Cork, Ireland
- Occupation: Student

Sport
- Sport: Gaelic Football
- Position: Right wing-back
Club
- Years: Club
- Cill Na Martra
Club titles
- Cork titles: 0
Inter-county
- Years: County
- 2019-present: Cork
Inter-county titles
- Munster titles: 0
- All-Irelands: 0
- NFL: 0
- All Stars: 0

Tadhg Corkery (born 1998) is an Irish Gaelic footballer who plays for Premier Intermediate Championship club Cill Na Martra and at inter-county level with the Cork senior football team. He usually lines out as a right wing-back.

== Honours ==
Cill na Martra

- Cork Intermediate A Football Championship (1): 2018

Cork

- National Football League Division 3 (1): 2020
