= Donnchadh Ó Cellaigh =

Donnchadh Ó Cellaigh, king of Uí Maine, Chief of the Name,
