= Breasal mac Maine Mór =

Breasal mac Maine Mór, 2nd king of Uí Maine, fl. 4th-century/5th-century.

John O'Donovan remarked that "Bresal, son of Maine, thirty years, when he died a natural death, which the poem states was surprising, as he had been much engaged in wars." He participated in the war that led to the foundation of Ui Maine with his father and grandfather.

| Preceded by Maine Mór | King of Uí Maine c.407?– c.437? | Succeeded by Fiachra Finn |
