= Tadhg Óg Ó Cellaigh =

King of Uí Maine, Ireland

Tadhg Óg Ó Cellaigh (died 1340) was King of Uí Maine and Chief of the Name.

Preceded by Ruaidri Ó Cellaigh	King of Uí Maine; 1339–1340	Succeeded by Diarmaid Ó Cellaigh
