= Senchineoil =

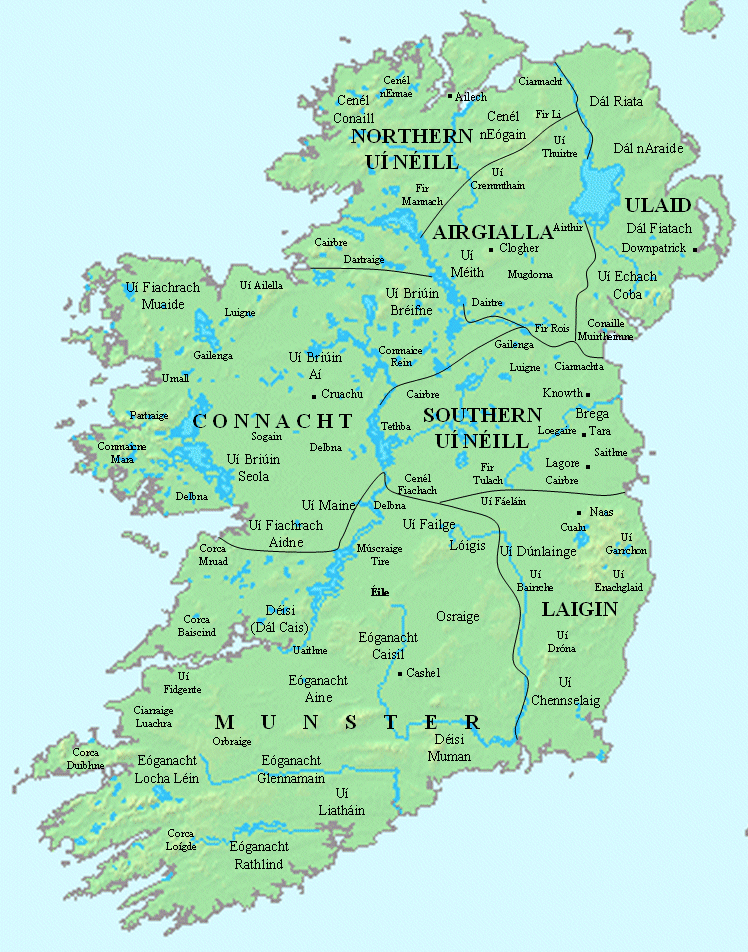
Early peoples and kingdoms of Ireland, c. 800

Senchineoil or Seincheinéal was the name of the early rulers, possibly pre-Gaelic, of what is now central and east County Galway and south County Roscommon, Ireland.

== Overview ==
The term Senchineoil (sen 'old' + cineoil 'people/tribe/kindred') was used by the Uí Maine to describe aithechtuatha ('unfree, enslaved vassal peoples') who they subjugated during the founding of their kingdom sometime prior to the 5th century AD. They are described as:

"Seincheinéal of the old plain of Soghan/stretched eastward over [the river] Suck/until it reached Delbhna of Dealbhaoth; manly were the good heroes, like a flame."

It is not known by what term the Senchineoil described themselves, or even if it was in Gaelic. Their last recorded ruler was Cian d'Fhearaibh Bolg.

== See also ==
- Uí Fiachrach Aidhne
- Clann Fhergail
- Clann Taidg
- Delbhna Tir Dha Locha
- Muintir Murchada
- Uí Maine
- Soghain
- Trícha Máenmaige
- Uí Díarmata
- Cóiced Ol nEchmacht
- Síol Anmchadha
- Iar Connacht
- Maigh Seola
- Cenél Áeda na hEchtge
- Cenél Guaire
- Muintir Máelfináin
- Conmaicne Cenéoil Dubáin
- Conmaicne Cuile Tolad
- Bunrath
- Uí Briúin Rátha
- Tír Maine
- Uí Briúin Seola
- Machaire Riabhach
- Maigh Mucruimhe
- Airthir Connacht
- Meadraige
- Corca Moga
- Óic Bethra
