= Kings of Uí Maine =

Uí Maine was the name of an Irish kingdom situated in south Connacht, consisting of all of County Galway east of Athenry, all of southern and central County Roscommon.

In prehistory it was believed to have spanned the River Shannon, and in the 8th century even briefly extended its dominion west to Galway Bay. It existed as an independent kingdom from prehistoric times, and as a subject kingdom up to the end of the medieval era.

The acknowledged senior branch of the Ó Ceallaigh (O'Kelly) Uí Maine is the O'Kelly de Gallagh and Tycooly (see Irish nobility and Chief of the Name), and are Counts of the Holy Roman Empire. Other branches include: O'Kelly of Aughrim, O'Kelly of Mullaghmore, O'Kelly of Clondoyle, O'Kelly de Galway, Ó Ceallaigh Iarthar Chláir, O'Kelly of Gurtray, O'Kelly of Screen, and O'Kelly Farrell.

== Semi-historic kings ==
All dates approximate.

- Maine Mór, fl. c.357–407
- Breasal mac Maine Mór, fl. c.407–c.437
- Fiachra Finn, fl. c.437–c.454
- Connall Cas Ciabhach, fl. c.454–c.476
- Dallán mac Breasal, fl. c.476–c.487
- Duach mac Dallán, fl. c.487–c.503
- Lughaidh mac Dallán, fl. c.503–c.517
- Feradhach mac Lughaidh, fl. c.517–c.541

== Early historic kings ==
- Maine mac Cearbhall, d. 531/537
- Marcán, fl. c. 541–556
- Cairbre Crom, fl. c.556
- Brenainn mac Cairbre, of Cenel Fechin, died 597/601
- Aedh Buidhe, killed 600
- Conall mac Máele Dúib (slain 629)
- Marcán mac Tommáin, of Cenel Fechin, (slain 653)
- Fithceallach mac Flainn, of Cenel Cairbre Chruim, died 691
- Seachnasach, of Cenel Fechin, died 711
- Dluthach mac Fithcheallach, of Cenel Cairbre Chruim, died 738
- Cathal Maenmaighe, of Cenel Fechin, died 745
- Ailello hui Daimine, of Clann Cremthainn, died 749
- Inreachtach mac Dluthach, of Cenel Cairbre Chruim, died 750
- Aedh Ailghin, of Ui Briuin, killed 767
- Dunchadh ua Daimhine, of Clann Cremthainn, died 780
- Conall mac Fidhghal, died 782
- Duncadho mac Duib Da Tuadh, of Clann Cremthainn, died 784
- Amhalgaidh, died 786
- Ailell mac Inreachtach, of Cenel Cairbre Chruim, died 791/799
- Dub Dá Leithe mac Tomaltach, died 816
- Cathal mac Murchadh, of Clann Cremthainn, killed 816
- Cathal mac Ailell, of Cenel Cairbre Chruim, died 844

== High medieval kings ==
- Mughroin mac Sochlachan, of Clann Cremthainn, died 904
- Sochlachan mac Diarmata, of Clann Cremthainn, died 909
- Murchadh mac Sochlachan, of Clann Cremthainn, died 936
- Murchadh mac Aodha, of Cenel Cairbre Chruim, died 960
- Geibennach mac Aedha, of Cenel Cairbre Chruim, died 973
- Muirgus mac Domnaill, of Clann Cremthainn, died 986
- Tadhg Mór Ua Cellaigh, died 1014
- Gadra son of Dúnadach, of Sil Anmchada, died AI1027.4
- Concobar mac Tadg Ua Cellaigh, died 1030
- Mac Tadhg Ua Cellaigh, died 1065
- Dunchadh Ua Cellaigh, died 1074
- Aed Ua Cellaigh, died 1134
- Diarmaid Ua Madadhan, died 1135
- Tadhg Ua Cellaigh, abducted 1145
- Conchobar Maenmaige Ua Cellaigh, died 1180
- Murrough Ua Cellaigh, died 1186
- Domnall Mór Ua Cellaigh, died 1221

== Post-Norman kings ==
- Conchobar Ó Cellaigh, reigned 1221–1268
- Maine Mor Ó Cellaigh, 1268–1271
- Domnall Ó Cellaig, 1271–1295
- Donnchad Muimnech Ó Cellaigh, 1295–1307
- Gilbert Ó Cellaigh, first reign 1307–1315
- Tadhg Ó Cellaigh, 1315–1316
- Conchobar mac Domnall Ó Cellaigh, 1316–1318
- Gilbert Ó Cellaigh, second reign, 1318–1322
- Aed Ó Cellaigh, c.1322–?
- Ruaidri Ó Cellaigh, c.1332–1339
- Tadgh Óg Ó Cellaigh, 1339–1340

== Kings of the Clanricarde era ==
- Diarmaid Ó Cellaigh, c.1340–c.1349
- William Ua Cellaig, c.1349–1381
- Maelsechlainn Ó Cellaigh, 1381–1402
- Conchobar an Abaidh Ó Cellaigh, 1402–1403
- Tadgh Ruadh Ó Cellaigh, 1403–1410
- Donnchadh Ó Cellaigh, 1410–1424
- Aedh mac Brian Ó Cellaigh, 1424–1467
- Aedh na gCailleach Ó Cellaigh, 1467–1469
- Tadhg Caech Ó Cellaigh, 1469–1476 King of East Uí Maine
- William Ó Cellaigh King of Iar Uí Maine 1472–1476, all Uí Maine 1476–1487
- Maelsechlainn mac Aedh Ó Cellaigh, 1488–1489
- Conchobar Óg mac Aedh Ó Cellaigh, 1489–1499
- Donnchadh mac Breasal Ó Cellaigh, 1489–?

== Early modern chiefs ==
- Maelsechlainn mac Tadhg Ó Cellaigh, 1499–1511
- Tadhg mac Maolsheachlainn Ó Cellaigh, 1511–1513
- Maelsechlainn mac William Ó Cellaigh, c.1513–1521
- Domnall mac Aedh na gCailleach Ó Cellaigh, c.1521– c.1536
- Donnchadh mac Eamonn Ó Cellaigh, 1536–after 1557
- Ceallach Ó Cellaigh, after 1557–after 1573
- Eigneachan Ó Cellaigh, c.1573–after 1580
- Aedh mac Donnchadh Ó Cellaig, after 1580–1590
- Tomás MacCnaimhín (Tomás Hugh MacKnavin O'Kelly) 1590–1602 (executed)
- Feardorcha Ó Cellaigh, 1602–1611

== Chiefs of the Name ==
- Melaghlin Ó Cellaigh, died 1637, father of
- Teige Ó Cellaigh of Aughrim, father of
- James O'Kelly, died 12 July 1691, at the Battle of Aughrim, father of
- John O'Kelly, died between 26 November 1732 and 13 February 1733, father of
- James Kelly, elder half-brother of
- Oliver Kelly, brother of
- Matthias Kelly, brother of
- William Kelly of Buckfield, d. 15 November 1760, father of
- Edmund Kelly of Buckfield, father of
- William Kelly of Buckfield, father of
- Thomas Kelly of Buckfield, brother of
- Edmond Kelly of Buckfield, father of
- William Kelly, succeeded by his cousin, Count O'Kelly
