= Tadhg Mór Ua Cellaigh =

Tadhg Mór Ua Cellaigh, 36th King of Uí Maine and 1st Chief of the Name.

== Background ==
Ua Cellaigh was the first King of Uí Maine to bear the surname Ua Cellaigh, derived from his grandfather, Ceallach mac Finnachta, who was in turn a sixth-generation descendant of Eoghan Finn, a descendant of the first king, Maine Mór. He succeeded Muirgus mac Domnaill, killed in battle in 986.

== Career ==
He seems to have been present at the battles of Lough Ree (987), and the hosting to Tara in 999. Tadhg allied himself with Brian Boru against King of Mide Máel Sechnaill mac Domnaill (975-1022) and two Kings of Connacht, Cathal mac Conchobar mac Taidg, (973-1010) and Tadg in Eich Gil (1010-1030).

He secured marriage alliances to Brian, as one of Tadhg's sisters is said to have become one of Brian's many wives. His position was bolstered with Brian's accession to the High-Kingship in 1002. He accompanied him to Dublin in 1014 where he fought and died at the Battle of Clontarf.

== In folk memory ==
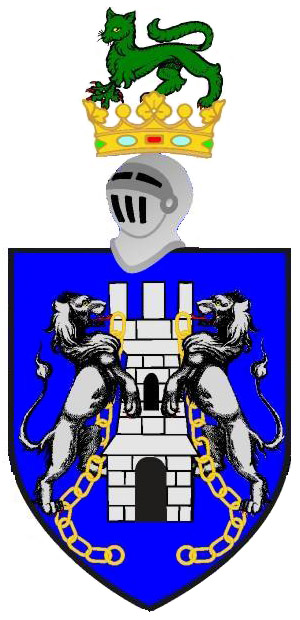
The coat of arms of the O Kelly of Ui Maine, featuring a green enfield as the crest

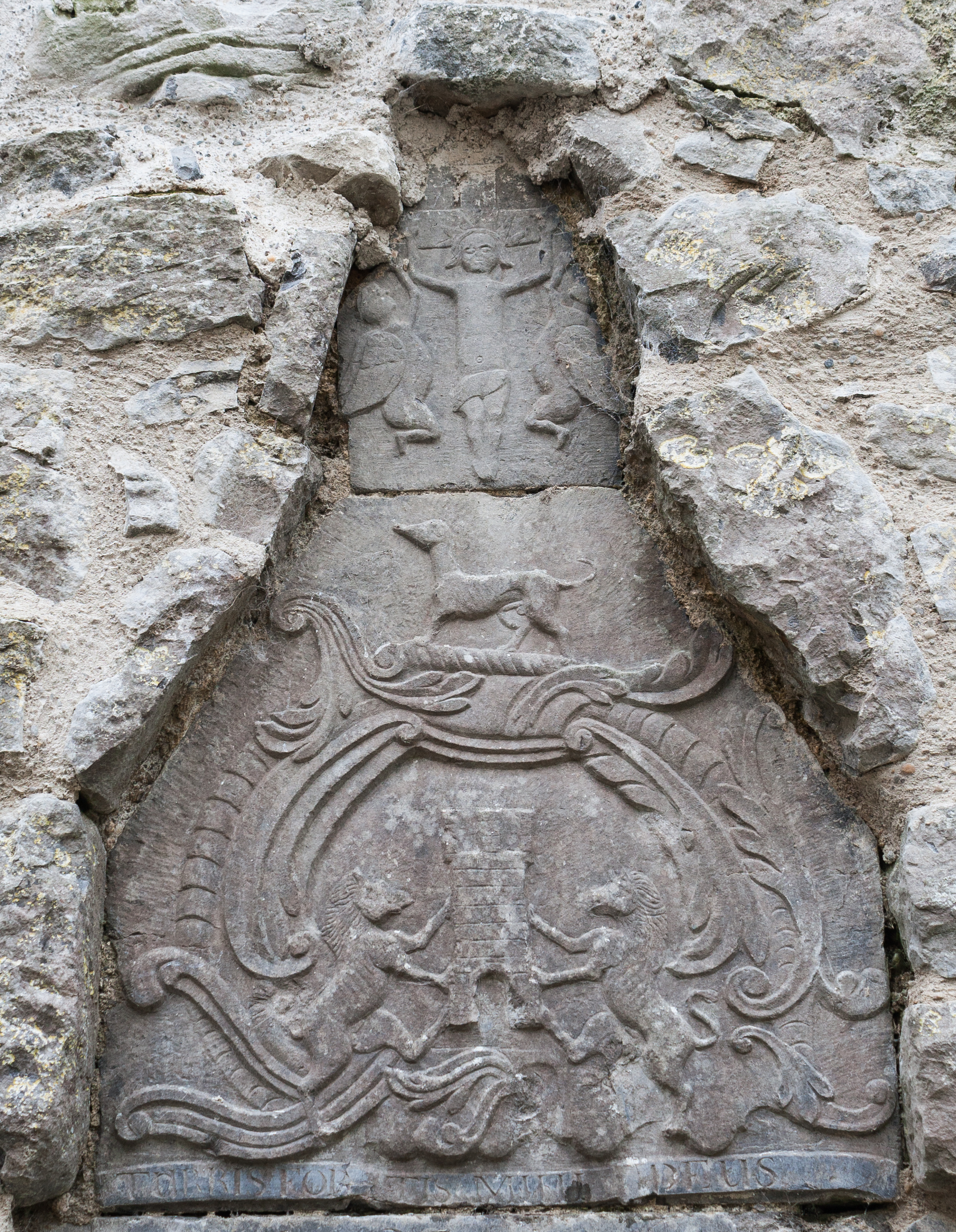
Coat of arms of the Kelly family at Tulsk Priory, County Roscommon

John O'Donovan recorded a tradition prevalent in the early 19th century concerning Tadhg Mór:

"There is a tradition among the O'Kellys of Hy-Many, that they have borne as their crest an enfield, since the time of this Tadhg Mor, from a belief that this fabulous animal issued from the sea at the Battle of Clontarf, to protect the body of O'Kelly from the Danes, til rescued by his followers. It is also recorded in the Irish annals, that this Tadhg or Teige O'Kelly was chief of Hy-Many in the year 1003 and was slain in the battle of Clontarf, fighting on the side of the monarch, Brian Borumha, 1014, and for this reason he is usually set down in the pedigrees as TADHG CATHA BHRIAIN, i.e., Teige of the Battle of Brian."

== Descendants ==
All but one subsequent king of Uí Maine would either descend from Tadhg Mór or bear the surname Ua/Ó Cellaigh, until Feardorcha Ó Cellaigh resigned the title Ó Cellaigh in the late 16th century. His senior descendants in the 21st century are the Counts and Countesses of Grallagh and Tyrcooley, while Kelly is the second most common surname in County Galway, all of whom are direct descendants of Ceallach mac Finnachta.

Preceded by Muirgus mac Domnaill	King of Uí Maine; 985–1014	Succeeded by Concobar mac Tadg Ua Cellaig

== See also ==
- Kelly
- O'Kelly
