= Uí Mháine =

Ancient Irish kingdom

Uí Mhaine
- 357–1611
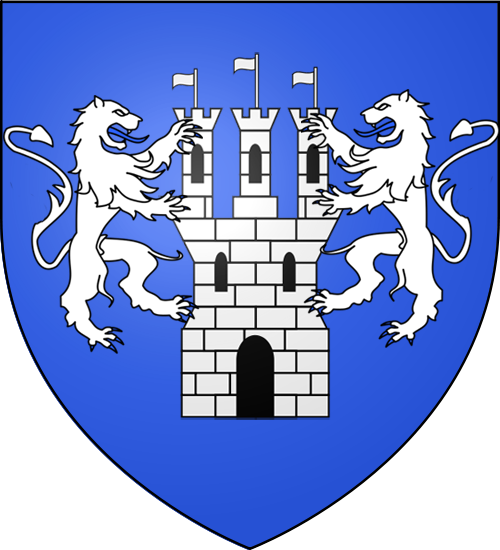
- Coat of arms

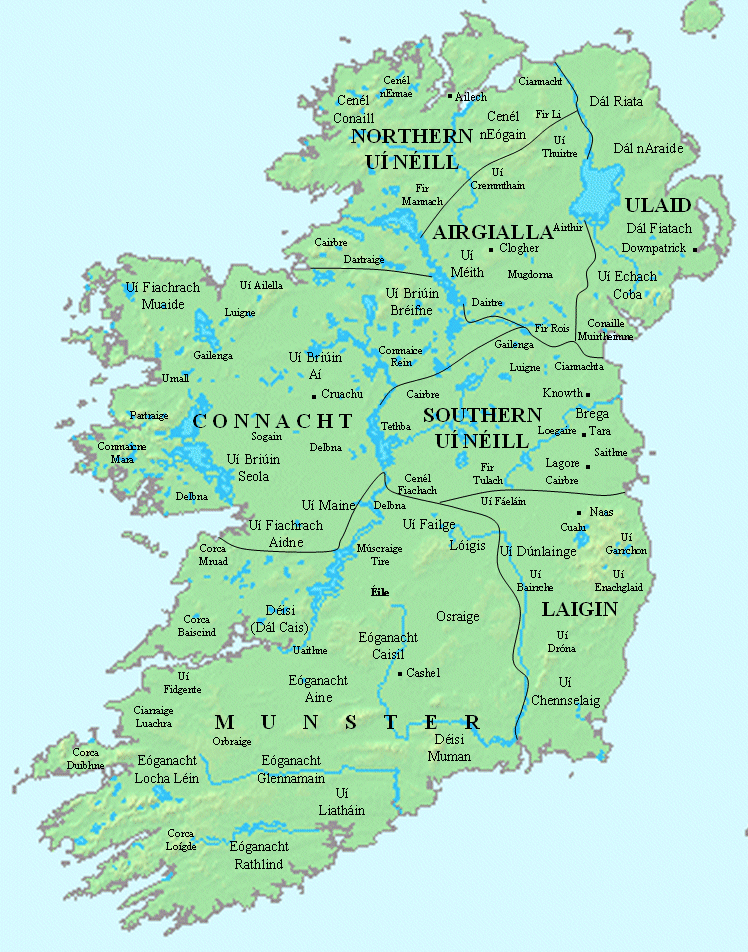
- Early peoples and kingdoms of Ireland, c.800
- Status: Túatha of Connacht (until 6th century)
- Common languages: Old Irish, Middle Irish, Early Modern Irish, Latin
- Religion: Gaelic Christianity; Catholic Christianity; Gaelic tradition
- Government: Tanistry
- Rí
  - 357–407: Máine Mór
  - 1593–1611: Feardorcha Ó Cellaigh
- History
  - Established: 4th century
  - Disestablished: 1611
- ISO 3166 code: IE
Preceded by
Senchineoil
Connacht
Succeeded by
Connacht
Clanricarde
Kingdom of Ireland
- Today part of: Ireland

Uí Mháine, often Anglicised as Hy Many, was one of the oldest and largest kingdoms located in Connacht, Ireland. Its territory of approximately 1,000 square miles (2,600 km^{2}) encompassed all of what is now north, east and south County Galway, south and central County Roscommon, an area near County Clare, and at one stage had apparently subjugated land on the east bank of the Shannon, together with the parish of Lusmagh in Offaly.

There were two different Uí Mhaine, the Uí Mhaine of Tethbae and the Uí Mhaine of Connacht; these tribes were separated by the Shannon River. The people of the kingdom were descendants of Maine Mór, who won the territory by warfare. Its sub-kingdoms, also known as lordships, included – among others – Soghan, Corco Modhruadh, Delbhna Nuadat, Síol Anmchadha, and Máenmag. These kingdoms were made up of offshoots of the Uí Mháine dynasty, or subject peoples of different backgrounds.

The Uí Mhaine are among the ancient Irish dynasties still represented today among the recognised Irish nobility and Chiefs of the Name, by the O'Kelly of Gallagh and Tycooly, Prince of Uí Mhaine and Count of the Holy Roman Empire. The Fox (O'Kearney) may represent the eastern Uí Mhaine of Tethbae.

== Early times ==
Maine Mór is said to have established the kingdom around 357 AD, and ruled for fifty years. Before his arrival, the area had been occupied by the Fir Bolg, ruled by King Cian d'Fhearaibh Bolg.

=== Early leaders (in order) ===
Name	Years Ruled	Death
Maine Mór	50 years	natural death
Breasal mac Maine Mór son of Maine Mór	30 years	natural death
Fiachra Finn son of Breasal	17 years	slain by brother
Connall Cas Ciabhach son of Breasal	22 years	slain
Dallán mac Breasal brother of Fiachra Finn	11 years	mortally wounded, then drowned
Duach mac Dallán son of Dallan	16 years	slain by Maine Macamh
Lughaidh mac Dallán son of Dallan	14 years	natural death
Feradhach mac Lughaidh son of Lughaidh	24 years	slain by successor
Marcán	15 years	slain with a sword
Feradhach mac Lughaidh son of Feradhach	9 years	slain by successor

== Main families ==
Descendant clans of the dynasty include the O'Kelly, Kelly, Ó Ceallaigh, Ó Comáin, Ó Draighnáin, Ó hUallacháin, Ó Madadháin, Ó Neachtain, Ó Cnaimhín, Ó Domhnalláin, Ó Maolalaidh, Ó Fallamháin, Ó Cionnaith, Ó Géibheannaigh, Ó Bhreasail, and Ó Duigenan.

== Customs ==
An early 15th-century text, Nosa Ua Maine, states that they were given rewards and treasures such as:

- A portion of all "strongholds and seaport towns in the province"
- A portion of all prizes and wrecks of the sea
  - This included any wines or goods that had been washed ashore from shipwrecks, etc.
  - It also included whales and fish, which came to be known as "royal fish" and were given to only the kings and queens
- Hidden treasures found underground, all silver and gold mines and other metals
- They were given a third of any revenues received by the king of Connacht of any other provinces where wrong had been done
- The revenue (or eric) of killing a person was considered very large, and in one document recorded was stated as being "168 cows"

Along with the privileges that kings and queens of Uí Maine received, the clans that fought for Uí Maine were also given privileges and rights:

- Any member of a clan was given a choice to go to battle in spring or autumn. Most members who chose not to attend battle spent time maintaining their crops.
- It was required that "no man of the province is to be taken as a witness against these tribes, but another Hy Manian is to bear witness".
- If the king of Connacht did not pull out or end a battle in six weeks or less when fighting in Ulster or Leinster, any member was allowed to return home.
- "However great may be the accusation brought against them by dishonest people, only one man or one witness is required to dent it or prove it against the other party."
- Uí Mhaine were to be baptised by the Comharba of St. Bridget. If parents chose not to baptise their children at St. Bridget's because they lived too far away, they were required to pay the Comharba a penny.
- Uí Mhaine were required to pay a sgreaball ongtha to the Comharba to prepare for death during an illness. This fee was said to be 3 Irish pennies.

== Members of Uí Maine Families ==
- Thomas MacNevin
- Albéric O'Kelly de Galway
- William O'Kelly Nevin (Irish Republican and personal physician to Empress Maria Theresa of the Holy Roman Empire)
- Edward Kelley, also known as Edward Talbot (11 August 1555 – 1 November 1597), Tudor occultist and self-declared spirit medium who worked with John Dee.
- Gerald Lally-Tollendahl (Marquis de Lally-Tollendal, prime minister of Scotland under James I; Lord of Tollendahl)

== Portuguese branches ==
From Ireland passed to France Bernard then Bernardo O'Kelly, who served in the Army with so much distinction that he came to be Governor of a hold with patent of Colonel, and from this country he transferred to Portugal, where he married. He was the father of Guilherme O'Kelly, Lieutenant of Cavalry of the Regiment of Moura, and Hugo O'Kelly, first Colonel and then Brigadier of the same Regiment. They were relatives of Count O'Kelly, Lieutenant-General of Infantry in the Armies of the Holy Roman Emperor. That Guilherme O'Kelly married Mariana Josefa, and from then on was born Diogo O'Kelly, Captain of Horses in the Regiment of Moura, to whom was issued a Chart of Arms, of succession, with those of his surname, on 14 April 1785. From Dublin, County Dublin, Leinster, Ireland, came also James Thomas then Diogo Tomás O'Kelly, dance master, who was an attendant of the Infante António of Portugal, and was prosecuted by the Holy Office for being a Freemason, initiated in 1735, and his brother Michael then Miguel O'Kelly, contractor of the factory of glasses, initiated in the Freemasonry in 1736 and prosecuted with his brother. Hugo O'Kelly, above-mentioned, also belonged to the Freemasonry and was implicated in the same process. The arms of the O'Kelly family are: broken, the first azure, a tower argent over a mount proper, between two lions assailant or, chained to the tower by the waist with chains sable, the second argent, with six crosslets recrossed, on top, whittled, sable, put 2, 2 and 2, and chief gules, charged with three roses natural argent; crest: a greyhound running argent, brindled sable; motto: TURRIS FORTIS MIHI DEUS. A third branch came to Portugal in the person of Waldron Kelly of Maddenstown, born in Maddenstown, County Kildare, Leinster, on 1 October 1794, who died at the Caribbean Sea, near Lucea, Hanover Parish, and Montego Bay, Saint James Parish, Cornwall County, Jamaica, on 11 November 1836 and was buried there. He married twice, firtsly to Jane Owens and secondly to Ana Ludovina de Lemos Pacheco de Aguilar, born in Cedovim, Vila Nova de Foz Coa, on 1 October 1794 and died in Dublin, County Dublin, Leinster, 4 April 1883, and buried there, a relative of the 1st Viscount and 1st Count of Samodães, and had issue by both marriages.

== See also ==
- Kings of Uí Maine
- Leabhar Ua Maine
- Edward Kelley
- The Uí Maine were traditionally thought to be descended from Colla da Crioch, one of the Three Collas. Their original homeland was Oirghialla. DNA testing of descendants of Uilliam Buidhe Ó Cellaigh, however, speculates that the Uí Maine were not descended from the Three Collas.
