= Madadhan =

Madadhan is an Irish name commonly anglicised as Madden and Madigan. Whilst originally a forename, it also became the surname Ó Madadhan, meaning "descendant of Madden".

== Notable people with the surname Ó Madadhan include ==
- Ambrose Ó Madadhan, first Prior of Portumna Priory
- Anmchadh Ó Madadhan, Chief of the Name, died 1636
- Breasal Ó Madadhan, Lord of Síol Anmchadha and Chief of the Name, died 1526
- Cathal Ó Madadhan (died 1286), King of Síol Anmchadha
- Diarmaid Cleirech Ua Madadhan (died 1207), King of Síol Anmchadha
- Diarmaid Ua Madadhan (died 1135), King of Síol Anmchadha and Uí Maine
- Domhnall Ó Madadhan, chief of Síol Anmchadha, fl. 1567 – after 8 March 1611
- Eoghan Carrach Ó Madadhan, Chief of Síol Anmchadha, fl. 1451
- Eoghan Mór Ó Madadhan, Chief of Síol Anmchadha, fl. 1371–1410
- Eoghan Ó Madadhan, Chief of Síol Anmchadha, fl. 1314–1347
- John Ó Madadhan, Lord of Síol Anmchadha and Chief of the Name, died 1556
- Madudan Mór Ua Madadhan, King of Síol Anmchadha, died after 1158
- Madudan Óg Ó Madadhan (died 1235), King of Síol Anmchadha
- Madudan Reamhar Ua Madadhan, Chief of Síol Anmchadha, 1069–1095
- Melaghlin Ua Madadhan (died 1188), King of Síol Anmchadha
- Murcadh Ó Madadhan, Chief of Síol Anmchadha, died 1451
- Murchadh Ó Madadhan, King of Síol Anmchadha, died 1327
- Murchadh Reagh Ó Madadhan, Chief of Síol Anmchadha, died 1475
- Owen Ó Madadhan, Lord of Síol Anmchadha and Chief of the Name, fl. 1475
- Richard Ó Madadhan, Prior of Portumna Priory in 1691

== See also ==
- Madden (surname), a page for people with the surname Madden
- Maddin, a page for people with the surname Maddin
