= List of kings of Síol Anmchadha =

Siol Anmchada was a petty kingdom and lordship of Uí Maine, in an area of the west of Ireland which is now part of Connacht. It was ruled by an offshoot of the Ui Maine called the Síol Anmchadha ("the seed of Anmchadh"), from whom the territory took its name. Some of them were also Kings of Hy-Many. Many of the Kings named below are of the O'Madden name, hence O'Madden's Country being used as a name for Síl nAnmchadha, but in O'Donovan's Tribes and Customs of Hy Many they are referred to as the "Old (or Ancient) Chiefs of Sil Anmchadha," and from O'Dugan's Topographical Poems as the "Chiefs of Sil Anmchadha," and in Irish Pedigrees; or, The Origin and Stem of the Irish Nation as "Chiefs of Anmchadha in Hy-Maine". It could be surmised that this could mean The O'Houlihans (Ó hUallacháins) may have been Chiefs of Sil Anmchadha before the O'Maddens, but are not recorded as such. The only recorded Chief of Sil Anmchadha of The O'Houlihan name is King Giolla Finn (Gillafinn) Mac Uallachain.

== Kings of Síol Anmchadha ==
- Cú Connacht mac Dundach, 1006
- Madudan mac Gadhra Mór, 1008
- Gadhra Mór mac Dundach, 1008–1027
- Dogra mac Dúnadach, killed 1027
- Dunadach mac Cú Connacht, 1027–1032
- Diarmaid mac Madudan, 1032–1069
- Madudan Reamhar Ua Madadhan, 1069–1096
- Giolla Finn mac Uallacháin, 1096–1101
- Diarmaid Ua Madadhan, 1101–1135
- Cú Coirne Ua Madudhan, 1135–1158
- Madudan Mór Ua Madadhan, 1158–?
- Melaghlin Ua Madadhan, ?–1188
- Diarmaid Cleirech Ua Madadhan, 1188–1207
- Madudan Óg Ó Madadhan, 1207–1235
- Cathal Ó Madadhan, 1235–1286

== Lords of Síol Anmchadha ==
- Murchadh Ó Madadhan, 1286–1327
- Eoghan Ó Madadhan, 1327–1347
- Murchadh Ó Madadhain, 1347–1371
- Eoghan Mór Ó Madadhan, 1371–1410
- Murcadh Ó Madadhan, 1410–1451
- Eoghan Carrach Ó Madadhan, 1451–?
- Murchadh Reagh Ó Madadhan, ?–1475
- Owen Ó Madadhan, 1475–c. 1479
- Breasal Ó Madadhan, c. 1479–1526
- Domhnall Ó Madadhan, 1567–1612
- Anmchadh Ó Madadhan, 1612–1636
