= Diarmaid =

- Pronunciation: Irish: [ˈdʲiəɾˠmˠədʲ]
- Gender: Male
- Language: Irish

Origin
- Meaning: 'without injunction'

Other names
- Alternative spelling: Diarmit
- Variant form: Diarmuit
- Nickname: Darby
- Anglicisations: Dimity, Jeremiah
- Related names: Diarmait

Diarmaid (Irish: [ˈdʲiəɾˠmˠədʲ]) is a masculine given name in the Irish language, which has historically been anglicized as Jeremiah or Jeremy, names with which it is etymologically unrelated. The name Dimity might have been used as a feminine English equivalent of the name in Ireland. Earlier forms of the name include Diarmit and Diarmuit. Variations of the name include Diarmait and Diarmuid. Anglicised forms of the name include Dermody, Dermot (/ˈdɜːrmət/, Hiberno-English: /ˈdɛərmət/) and Dermod. Mac Diarmata, anglicised McDermott and similar, is the patronymic and surname derived from the personal name. The exact etymology of the name is debated. There is a possibility that the name is derived in part from dí, which means "without"; and either from airmit, which means "injunction", or airmait, which means "envy". The Irish name later spread to Scotland where in Scottish Gaelic the form of the name is Diarmad; Anglicised forms of this name include Diarmid and Dermid.

== Diarmaid ==
- Diarmaid Mac an Bhaird (fl. 1670) Irish poet
- Diarmaid Blake Gaelic footballer
- Diarmaid MacCulloch (born 1951) British church historian
- Diarmaid the Just Irish abbot
- Diarmaid Ó Donnchadha (fl. 1418) Bishop of Kilmacduagh
- Diarmaid FitzGerald (born 1983) Irish hurler
- Diarmaid Riabach Ó Seachnasaigh (died 1579) Irish lord
- Diarmaid mac Madudan (fl.1032-1069) king of Síol Anmchadha
- Diarmaid Ua Madadhan (died 1135) King of Síol Anmchadha and Uí Maine
- Diarmaid Ó Cellaigh (died c.1349) King of Uí Maine
- Diarmaid Ó Seachnasaigh (died before 1567) Irish knight
- Diarmaid Ferriter (born 1973), Irish historian
- Diarmaid Cleirech Ua Madadhan (died 1207) King of Síol Anmchadha
- Diarmaid mac Tadgh Ua Ceallaigh (died 1065) King of Uí Maine
- Diarmaid Ó Máille (died 1415) Irish lord
- Diarmaid Ó Cúlacháin (died 1221) Irish historian and scribe
- Diarmaid Jennings, the inspiration for Jennings

== Diarmait ==
- Diarmait mac Cerbaill, King of Tara, died 565
- Diarmait mac Áedo Sláine, Co-king of Tara, died 664
- Diarmait ua Tigernáin, abbot of Armagh, died 852
- Diarmait mac Máel na mBó, King of Leinster, died 1072
- Diarmait mac Murchada, King of Leinster, died 1171
- Diarmait of Iona
- Diarmait mac Conaing
- Diarmait mac Tommaltaig
- Diarmait Dian
- Diarmait Ó Cobhthaigh

== Diarmuid ==
- Diarmuid Ua Duibhne, a warrior in Irish mythology
- Diarmuid Byron O'Connor, British Sculptor
- Diarmuid Connolly (born 1987), Dublin Gaelic football player; hurling player
- Diarmuid Dalton, British bass guitarist
- Sir Diarmuid Downs (1922–2014), British automotive engineer
- Diarmuid Gavin (born 1964), Irish garden designer and television personality
- Diarmuid Hegarty (Griffith College), Irish academic; president of Griffith College, Dublin
- Diarmuid Kirwan, Irish hurling referee
- Diarmuid Lawrence (born 1947), British television director
- Diarmuid Lynch (1878–1950), Irish Republican Brotherhood member; Sinn Féin member
- Diarmuid Lyng (born 1981), Irish sportsperson
- Diarmuid Martin (born 1945), Roman Catholic Archbishop of Dublin and Primate of Ireland
- Diarmuid Murphy (born 1975), Irish sportsperson
- Diarmuid O'Carroll (born 1987), Irish professional footballer
- Diarmuid O'Connor (disambiguation), multiple people
- Diarmuid O'Hegarty, Irish revolutionary and civil servant
- Diarmuid O'Neill (1969–1996), Provisional Irish Republican Army member
- Diarmuid O'Scannlain (born 1937) American jurist (United States Court of Appeals for the Ninth Circuit)
- Diarmuid O'Sullivan (born 1978), Irish sportsperson
- Diarmuid Wilson (born 1965), Irish Fianna Fáil politician and member of Seanad Éireann

Mythological

- Diarmuid Ua Duibhne, hero of The Pursuit of Diarmuid and Gráinne

== Dermot ==
- Dermot Ahern, Irish politician
- Dermot Bailey, British professional wheelchair tennis player
- Dermot Earley (disambiguation), multiple people
- Dermot Gallagher, Irish sports referee
- Dermot Honan, Irish politician
- Dermot Keely, Irish sports manager and player
- Dermot Kennedy, Irish singer, songwriter, and musician
- Dermot Mac Curtain, Irish sportsperson
- Dermot Malone (fl. 2010s), Irish Gaelic footballer
- Dermot Morgan, Irish comedian
- Dermot Mulroney, American actor
- Dermot Murnaghan, British broadcaster
- Dermot O'Leary, English television presenter
- Dermot O'Neill (gardener), Irish gardener
- Dermot O'Neill (footballer), Irish football player
- Dermot Weld, Irish racehorse trainer
- Dermott Brereton, Australian sportsperson

== Dermod ==
- Dermod Dwyer, Irish businessman
- Dermod O'Brien (1865-1945) Anglo-Irish painter
- Dermod O'Brien, 2nd Baron Inchiquin (died 1557)
- Dermod O'Brien, 5th Baron Inchiquin (1594–1624)
- Dermod O'Meara (fl.1619) Irish physician and poet

== Diarmid ==
- Diarmid Heidenreich

Surname

- Allastair Malcolm Cluny McReady-Diarmid

== See also ==
- List of Irish-language given names
