= List of state leaders in the 12th century =

This is a list of state leaders in the 12th century (1101–1200) AD, except for the many leaders within the Holy Roman Empire.

== Africa ==
=== Africa: Central ===
Chad

- Kanem Empire (Kanem–Bornu) (complete list) –

- Dunama I, Mai (1080–1133)
- Bir I, Mai (1133–1160)
- Abdallah I, Mai (1160–1176)
- Salmama I, Mai (1176–1203)

=== Africa: East ===
Ethiopia

- Zagwe dynasty of Ethiopia (complete list) –

- Kedus Harbe, Negus (c.1079–c.1119)
- Gebre Mesqel Lalibela, Negus (1189–1229)

Somalia

- Sultanate of Ifat: Walashma dynasty (complete list) –

- ʿUmar DunyaHuz, Sultan (1185–1228)

=== Africa: Northeast ===
Egypt

- Fatimid Caliphate (complete list) –

- al-Musta'li, Caliph (1094–1101)
- al-Amir bi-Ahkami'l-Lah, Caliph (1101–1130)
- al-Hafiz, Caliph (1130–1149)
- al-Zafir, Caliph (1149–1154)
- al-Fa'iz bi-Nasr Allah, Caliph (1154–1160)
- al-Adid, Caliph (1160–1171)

Sudan

- Makuria (complete list) –

- Georgios IV, King (1130–1158)
- Moses Georgios, King (c.1158)

=== Africa: Northcentral ===
Ifriqiya

- Zirid dynasty (complete list) –

- Tamim ibn al-Mu'izz, ruler (1062–1108)
- Yahya ibn Tamim, ruler (1108–1131)
- Ali ibn Yahya, ruler (1115–1121)
- Abul-Hasan al-Hasan ibn Ali, ruler (1121–1152)

=== Africa: Northwest ===
Morocco

- Almoravid dynasty of Morocco (complete list) –

- Yusuf ibn Tashfin, Sultan (1072–1106)
- Ali ibn Yusuf, Sultan (1106–1142)
- Tashfin ibn Ali, Sultan (1142–1146)
- Ibrahim ibn Tashfin, Sultan (1146)
- Ishaq ibn Ali, Sultan (1146–1147)

- Almohad Caliphate of Morocco (complete list) –

- Abd al-Mu'min, Caliph (1147–1163)
- Abu Yaqub Yusuf, Caliph (1163–1184)
- Yaqub al-Mansur, Caliph (1184–1199)
- Muhammad al-Nasir, Caliph (1199–1213)

=== Africa: West ===
Benin

- Kingdom of Benin (complete list) –

- Eweka I, Oba (1180–1246)

Nigeria

- Kingdom of Kano (complete list) –

- Gijimasu dan Warisi, King (1095–1134)
- Nawata, King (1134–1136)
- Yusa, King (1136–1194)
- Naguji, King (1194–1247)

- Kingdom of Nri (complete list) –

- Eze Nri Nàmóke, King (1090–1158)
- Eze Nri Buífè, King (1159–1259)

== Asia ==
=== Asia: Central ===
Afghanistan

- Ghaznavid dynasty (complete list) –

- Mas'ud III, Sultan (1099–1115)
- Shir-Zad, Sultan (1115–1116)
- Arslan-Shah, Sultan (1116–1117)
- Bahram-Shah, Sultan (1117–1157)
- Khusrau Shah, Sultan (1157–1160)
- Khusrau Malik, Sultan (1160–1186)

Kazakhstan

- Qara Khitai / Western Liao

- Yelü Dashi, Emperor (1124–1143)
- Xiao Tabuyan, Empress Regent (1144–1150)
- Renzong, Emperor (1150–1164)
- Yelü Pusuwan, Empress Regent (1164–1178)
- Yelü Zhilugu, Sovereign (1178–1211)

Mongolia

- Khamag Mongol (complete list) –

- Khaidu, ruler (?–c.1100)
- Khabul, Khan (1120–1148)
- Ambaghai, Khan (1148–1156)
- Hotula, Khan (1156–1160)
- Yesugei de facto ruler (?–1171)
- Genghis, Khan (1189–1206)

Tibet

- Guge

- Zhi ba 'Od, ruler (?–1111)
- bSod nams rtse, King (c.1095–early 12th century)
- bKra shis rtse, King (pre-1137)
- Jo bo rGyal po, Regent (mid-12th century)
- rTse 'bar btsan, King (12th century)
- sPyi lde btsan, King (12th century)
- rNam lde btsan, King (12th/13th century)
- Nyi ma lde, King (12th/13th century)

=== Asia: East ===
Khitan China: Liao dynasty

- Liao dynasty (complete list) –

- Daozong, Emperor (1055–1101)
- Tianzuo, Emperor (1101–1125)

China: Northern Song

- Song dynasty (complete list) –

- Huizong, Emperor (1100–1125)
- Qinzong, Emperor (1126–1127)

China: Jin dynasty

- Jin dynasty –

- Taizu, Emperor (1115–1123)
- Taizong, Emperor (1123–1135)
- Xizong, Emperor (1135–1150)
- Prince of Hailing, Emperor (1150–1161)
- Shizong, Emperor (1161–1189)
- Zhangzong, Emperor (1189–1208)

China: Other states and entities

- Dali Kingdom (complete list) –

- Duan Zhengchun, Emperor (1096–1108)
- Duan Yu, Emperor (1108–1147)
- Duan Zhengxing, Emperor (1147–1171)
- Duan Zhixing, Emperor (1171–1200)
- Duan Zhilian, Emperor (1200–1204)

- Western Xia –

- Chóngzōng, Emperor (1086–1139)
- Rénzōng, Emperor (1139–1193)
- Huánzōng, Emperor (1193–1206)

China: Southern Song

- Song dynasty (complete list) –

- Gaozong, Emperor (1127–1162)
- Xiaozong, Emperor (1162–1189)
- Guangzong, Emperor (1189–1194)
- Ningzong, Emperor (1194–1224)

Japan

- Heian period Japan (complete list) –

- Horikawa, Emperor (1087–1107)
- Toba, Emperor (1107–1123)
- Sutoku, Emperor (1123–1142)
- Konoe, Emperor (1142–1155)
- Go-Shirakawa, Emperor (1155–1158)
- Nijō, Emperor (1158–1165)
- Rokujō, Emperor (1165–1168)
- Takakura, Emperor (1168–1180)
- Antoku, Emperor (1180–1185)
- Go-Toba, Emperor (1183–1198)

- Kamakura shogunate

- Emperors (complete list) –

- Go-Toba, Emperor (1183–1198)
- Tsuchimikado, Emperor (1198–1210)

- Shōgun (complete list) –

- Minamoto no Yoritomo, shōgun (1192–1199)

- Ryukyu Kingdom: Shunten Dynasty –

- Shunten, Chief (1187–1237)

Korea

- Goryeo (complete list) –

- Sukjong, King (1095–1105)
- Yejong, King (1105–1122)
- Injong, King (1122–1146)
- Uijong, King (1146–1170)
- Myeongjong, King (1170–1197)
- Sinjong, King (1197–1204)

=== Asia: Southeast ===
Cambodia

- Khmer Empire (complete list) –

- Nripatindravarman, King (1080–1113)
- Jayavarman VI, King (1080–1107)
- Dharanindravarman I, King (1107–1113)
- Suryavarman II, King (1113–1150)
- Dharanindravarman II, King (1150–1156)
- Yasovarman II, King (1156–1165)
- Tribhuvanadityavarman, King (1165–1177)
- Jayavarman VII, King (1181–1218)

Indonesia

Indonesia: Java

- Sunda Kingdom (complete list) –

- Prabu Langlangbhumi, Maharaja (1064–1154)
- Rakeyan Jayagiri, Maharaja (1154–1156)
- Prabu Dharmakusumah, Maharaja (1156–1175)
- Prabu Guru Dharmasiksa, Maharaja (1175-1297)

- Kediri Kingdom –

- Jayawarsa, King (c.1104–1115)
- Kameshwara, King (c.1115–1130)
- Jayabaya, King (c.1130–1157)
- Sarweshwara, King (c.1160–1170)
- Aryyeçwara, King (c.1170–1180)
- Gandra, King (c.1180–1190)
- Çrngga, King (c.1190–1200)
- Kertajaya, King (1200–1222)

Indonesia: Sumatra

- Srivijaya: Palembang –

- Rajaraja Chola II, King (c.1156)
- Srimat Trailokyaraja Maulibhusana Warmadewa, King (c.1183)

- Melayu Kingdom/ Dharmasraya: Mauli dynasty (complete list) –

- Trailokyaraja, King (c.1183)

Indonesia: Lesser Sunda Islands

- Bali Kingdom (complete list) –

Warmadewa dynasty
- Śri Maharaja Sakalendukirana Laksmidhara Wijayottunggadewi, Queen (fl.1088–1101)
- Śri Suradhipa, King (fl.1115–1119)
Jaya dynasty
- Śri Jayaśakti, King (fl.1133–1150)
- Ragajaya, King (fl.1155)
- Jayapangus, King (fl.1178–1181)
- Arjayadengjayaketana, Queen (fl.1200)
- Haji Ekajayalancana, King (co-regent fl.1200)

Malaysia: Peninsular

- Kedah Sultanate (complete list) –

- Durbar II, Raja (c.956–1136)
- Mudzaffar Shah I, Sultan, (1136–1179)
- Mu'adzam Shah, Sultan, (1179–1202)

Myanmar / Burma

- Pagan Kingdom (complete list) –

- Alaungsithu (Sithu I), King (1112/13–1167)
- Narathu, King (1167–1171)
- Naratheinkha, King (1171–1174)
- Narapatisithu (Sithu II), King (1174–1211)

Philippines

- Tondo (complete list) –

- Lakan Timamanukum, ruler (12th century)

Thailand

- Ngoenyang (complete list) –

- Lao Chong, King (11th–12th century)
- Chom Pha Rueang, King (early 12th century–1148)
- Chueang, King (1148–1192)
- Lao Ngoen Rueang, King (1192–early 13th century)

Vietnam

- Đại Việt: Later Lý dynasty (complete list) –

- Lý Nhân Tông, Emperor (1072–1127)
- Lý Thần Tông, Emperor (1128–1138)
- Lý Anh Tông, Emperor (1138–1175)
- Lý Cao Tông, Emperor (1176–1210)

- Champa (complete list) –

- Jaya Indravarman II, King (1080–1081, 1086–1114)
- Harivarman V, King (1114–1139)
- Jaya Indravarman III, King (1139/45)
- Rudravarman IV, (Khmer vassal) King (1145–1147)
- Jaya Harivarman I, King (1147–1167)
- Jaya Harivarman II, King (1167)
- Jaya Indravarman IV, King (1167–1190)
- Suryajayavarmadeva, (Khmer vassal in Vijaya) King (1190–1191)
- Vidyanandana, (Khmer vassal in Pandurang) King (1190–1203)

=== Asia: South ===
Afghanistan

- Ghaznavids (complete list) –

- Masʽud III, Sultan (1099–1115)
- Shir-Zad, Sultan (1115–1116)
- Arslan-Shah, Sultan (1116–1117)
- Bahram-Shah, Sultan (1117–1157)
- Khusrau-Shah, Sultan (1157–1160)
- Khusrau Malik, Sultan (1160–1186)
- Khosrow-Shah, Sultan (1168–1176)

- Ghurid dynasty (complete list) –

- Izz al-Din Husayn, Malik (1100–1146)
- Sayf al-Din Suri, Malik (1146–1149)
- Baha al-Din Sam I, Malik (1149)
- Ala al-Din Husayn, Malik (1149–1161)
- Sayf al-Din Muhammad, Malik (1161–1163)
- Ghiyath al-Din Muhammad, Malik (1163–1203)
- Muhammad of Ghor, Malik (1172–1206)

Bengal and Northeast India

- Chutia Kingdom (complete list) –

- Birpal, King (1187–1224)

- Mallabhum (complete list) –

- Prakash Malla, King (1097–1102)
- Ram Malla, King (1185–1209)

- Kingdom of Manipur (complete list) –

- Loiyumba, King (1074–1112)
- Loitongpa, King (1112–1150)
- Atom Yoilempa, King (1150–1163)
- Iyanthapa, King (1163–1195)
- Thayanthapa, King (1195–1231)

- Pala Empire (complete list) –

- Ramapala, King (1072–1126)
- Kumarapala, King (1126–1128)
- Gopala III, King (1128–1143)
- Madanapala, King (1143–1161)
- Govindapala, King (1161–1165)

- Sena dynasty (complete list) –

- Vijaya Sena, King (1096–1159)
- Ballala Sena, King (1159–1179)
- Lakshmana Sena, King (1179–1206)

India

- Amber Kingdom (complete list) –

- Malayasi, King (1094–1146)
- Vijaldeo, King (1146–1179)
- Rajdeo, King (1179–1216)

- Chahamanas of Naddula (complete list) –

- Jojalladeva, King (c.1090–1110)
- Asharaja, King (c.1110–1119)
- Ratnapala, King (c.1119–1132)
- Rayapala, King (c.1132–1145)
- Katukaraja, King (c.1145–1148)
- Alhanadeva, King (c.1148–1163)
- Kelhanadeva, King (c.1163–1193)
- Jayatasimha, King (c.1193–1197)

- Chahamanas of Shakambhari (complete list) –

- Ajayaraja II, King (c.1110–1135)
- Arnoraja, King (c.1135–1150)
- Jagaddeva, King (c.1150)
- Vigraharaja IV, King (c.1150–1164)
- Aparagangeya, King (c.1164–1165)
- Prithviraja II, King (c.1165–1169)
- Someshvara, King (c.1169–1178)
- Prithviraj Chauhan, King (c.1178–1192)
- Govindaraja IV, King (c.1192)
- Hariraja, King (c.1193–1194)

- Chandelas of Jejakabhukti (complete list) –

- Sallakshana-Varman, King (c.1100–1110)
- Jaya-Varman, King (c.1110–1120)
- Prithvi-Varman, King (c.1120–1128)
- Madana-Varman, King (c.1128–1165)
- Yasho-Varman II, King (c.1164–1165)
- Paramardi-Deva, King (c.1165–1203)

- Chaulukya dynasty of Gujarat (complete list) –

- Jayasimha Siddharaja, King (1094–1143)
- Kumarapala, King (1143–1172)
- Ajayapala, King (1172–1174)
- Mularaja II, King (1174–1177)
- Bhima II, King (1177–1240)

- Western Chalukya Empire (complete list) –

- Vikramaditya VI, King (1076–1126)
- Someshvara III, King (1126–1138)
- Jagadhekamalla II1138–1151)
- Tailapa III, King (1151–1164)
- Jagadhekamalla III, King (1163–1183)
- Someshvara IV, King (1184–1200)

- Chera Perumals of Makotai (complete list) –

- Rama Varma Kulashekhara, King (1089–1102/22)
- Kotha Varma Marthandam, King (1102–1125)
- Vira Kerala Varma I, King (1125–1145)
- Kodai Kerala Varma, King (1145–1150)
- Vira Ravi Varma, King (1145–1150)
- Vira Kerala Varma II, King (1164–1167)
- Vira Aditya Varma, King (1167–1173)
- Vira Udaya Martanda Varma, King (1173–1192)
- Devadaram Vira Kerala Varma III, King (1192–1195)
- Vira Manikantha Rama Varma Tiruvadi, King (1195–?)

- Chola dynasty (complete list) –

- Kulothunga Chola I, King (1070–1120)
- Vikrama Chola, King (1118–1135)
- Kulothunga Chola II, King (1133–1150)
- Rajaraja Chola II, King (1146–1173)
- Rajadhiraja Chola II, King (1166–1178)
- Kulothunga Chola III, King (1178–1218)

- Gahadavala dynasty (complete list) –

- Chandradeva, King (c.1089–1103)
- Madanapala, King (c.1104–1113)
- Govindachandra, King (c.1114–1155)
- Vijayachandra, King (c.1155–1169)
- Jayachandra, King (c.1170–1194)
- Harishchandra, King (c.1194–1197)

- Eastern Ganga dynasty (complete list) –

- Anantavarman Chodaganga, King (1078–1150)
- Jateswara Deva or Ekajata Deva, King (1147–1156)
- Raghava Deva, King (1156–1170)
- Rajaraja Deva II, King (1170–1178)
- Ananga Bhima Deva II, King (1178–1198)
- Rajaraja Deva III, King (1198–1211)

- Garhwal Kingdom (complete list) –

- Vibhog Pal, King (1084–1101)
- Suvayanu Pal, King (1102–1115)
- Vikram Pal, King (1116–1131)
- Vichitra Pal, King (1131–1140)
- Hans Pal, King (1141–1152)
- Som Pal, King (1152–1159)
- Kadil Pal, King (1159–1164)
- Kamdev Pal, King (1172–1179)
- Sulakshan Dev, King (1179–1197)
- Lakhan Dev, King (1197–1220)

- Hoysala Empire (complete list) –

- Ereyanga, King (1098–1102)
- Veera Ballala I, King (1102–1108)
- Vishnuvardhana, King (1108–1152)
- Narasimha I, King (1152–1173)
- Veera Ballala II, King (1173–1220)

- Jaisalmer (complete list) –

- Rawal Jaisal, Rawal (1153–1168)
- Shalivahan Singh II, Rawal (1168–1200)
- Baijal Singh, Rawal (1200)
- Kailan Singh, Rawal (1200–1219)

- Kahlur (complete list) –

- Gokul Chand, Raja (early 12th century)
- Udai Chand, Raja (1133–1143)
- Gen Chand, Raja (late 12th century)
- Pruthvi Chand, Raja (late 12th century)
- Sangar Chand, Raja (1197–1220)

- Kakatiya dynasty (complete list) –

- Rudra, King (c.1158–1195)
- Mahadeva, King (c.1196–1199)
- Ganapati-deva, King (c.1199–1262)

- Kalachuris of Kalyani (complete list) –

- Bijjala II, King (1162–1167)
- Sovideva, King (1168–1176)
- Mallugi, King (c.1176)
- Sankama, King (1176–1180)
- Ahavamalla, King (1180–1183)
- Singhana, King (1183–1184)

- Kalachuris of Tripuri (complete list) –

- Yashahkarna, King (1073–1123)
- Gayakarna, King (1123–1153)
- Narasimha, King (1153–1163)
- Jayasimha, King (1163–1188)
- Vijayasimha, King (1188–1210)

- Kumaon Kingdom: Chand (complete list) –

- Laxmi Chand, King (1093–1113)
- Dharm Chand, King (1113–1121)
- Karm Chand, King (1121–1140)
- Ballal Chand, King (1140–1149)
- Nami Chand, King (1149–1170)
- Nar Chand, King (1170–1177)
- Nanaki Chand, King (1177–1195)
- Ram Chand, King (1195–1205)

- Kingdom of Kutch (complete list) –

- Lakho Jadani, King (1147–?)
- Ratto Rayadhan, King (1175–?)

- Lohara dynasty (complete list) –

- Harsha, King (1089–1101)

- Pandyan dynasty (complete list) –

- Seervallabha Manakulachala, King (1101–1124)
- Maaravaramban Seervallaban, King (1132–1161)
- Parakrama Pandyan I, King (1161–1162)
- Jatavarman Srivallaban, King (1175–1180)
- Sadayavarman Kulasekaran I, King (1190–1216)

- Paramaras of Chandravati (complete list) –

- Kakkala-deva, or Kakala-deva, King (c.1090–1115)
- Vikrama-simha, King (c.1115–1145)
- Yasho-dhavala, King (c.1145–1160)
- Rana-simha, King (?)
- Dhara-varsha, King (c.1160–1220)

- Paramara dynasty of Malwa (complete list) –

- Naravarman, King (1094–1130)
- Yashovarman, King (1133–1142)
- Jayavarman I, King (1142–1143)
- Vindhyavarman, King (1175–1194)
- Subhatavarman, King (1194–1209)

- Seuna (Yadava) dynasty (complete list) –

- Bhillama V, King (c.1187–1191)
- Jaitugi I, King (c.1191–1200/10)

- Sisodia (complete list) –

- Samanta Singh, Rajput (1172–1179)
- Khumar, Manthan, Padam Singh, Rajput (1179–1213)

Maldives

- Sultanate of the Maldives: Theemuge dynasty (complete list) –

- Koimala, King (1117–1141)
- Dhovemi, King/Sultan (1141–1166/1176)
- Muthey, Sultan (1166/1176–1185)
- Ali I, Sultan (1185–1193)
- Dhinei, Sultan (1193–1199)
- Dhihei, Sultan (1199–1214)

Nepal

- Khasa kingdom

- Naga lde, King (early 12th century)
- bTsan phyug lde, King (mid-12th century)
- bKra shis lde, King (12th century)
- Grags btsan lde, King (12th century)

Pakistan

- Soomra dynasty –

- Zainab Tari, Queen (1092–1102)
- Dodo Bin Khafef Soomro III, King (1181–1195)

Sri Lanka

- Kingdom of Polonnaruwa (complete list) –

- Vijayabahu I, King (1056–1111)
- Jayabahu I, King (1110–1111)
- Vikramabahu I, King (1111–1132)
- Gajabahu II, King (1131–1153)
- Parakramabahu I, King (1153–1186)
- Vijayabahu II, King (1186–1187)
- Mahinda VI, King (1187–1187)
- Nissanka Malla, King (1187–1196)
- Vira Bahu I, King (1196–1196)
- Vikramabahu II, King (1196–1196)
- Chodaganga, King (1196–1197)
- Lilavati, King (1197–1200, 1209–1210, 1211–1212)

=== Asia: West ===
Mesopotamia

- Abbasid Caliphate, Baghdad (complete list) –

- al-Mustazhir, Caliph (1094–1118)
- Al-Mustarshid, Caliph (1118–1135)
- al-Muqtafi, Caliph (1136–1160)
- al-Mustanjid, Caliph (1160–1170)
- al-Mustadi, Caliph (1170–1180)
- al-Nasir, Caliph (1180–1225)

Iran

- Seljuk Empire, Hamadan (complete list) –

- Barkiyaruq, Sultan (1094–1105)
- Malik-Shah II, Sultan (1105)
- Muhammad Tapar, Sultan (1105–1118)
- Mahmud II, Sultan (1118–1131)
- Dawud, Sultan (1131–1132)
- Tughril II, Sultan (1132–1134)
- Masud, Sultan (1134–1152)
- Malik-Shah III, Sultan (1152–1153)
- Muhammad-Shah, Sultan (1153–1159)
- Suleiman-Shah, Sultan (1159–1161)
- Arslan-Shah, Sultan (1161–1176)
- Toghrul III, Sultan (1176–1191, 1192–1194)
- Qizil Arslan, Sultan (1191)

- Seljuk Empire, Marv (complete list) –

- Ahmad Sanjar, Sultan (1118–1153)

Yemen

- Yemeni Zaidi State (complete list) –

- al-Mutawakkil Ahmad bin Sulayman, Imam (1138–1171)
- al-Mansur Abdallah, Imam (1187–1217)

== Europe ==
=== Europe: Anatolia ===
- Seljuk Sultanate of Rum (complete list) –

- Kilij Arslan I, Sultan (1092–1109)
- Malik Shah, Sultan (1109–1116)
- Mesud I, Sultan (1116–1156)
- Kilij Arslan II, Sultan (1156–1192)
- Kaykhusraw I, Sultan (1192–1197)
- Suleiman II, Sultan (1197–1204)

=== Europe: Balkans ===
- Second Bulgarian Empire (complete list) –

- Peter IV, Emperor (1185–1190, 1196–1197)
- Ivan Asen I, Emperor (1189–1196)
- Kaloyan, Emperor (1197–1207)

- Byzantine Empire (complete list) –

- Alexios I Komnenos, Emperor (1081–1118)
- John II Komnenos, Emperor (1092–1143) with Alexios Komnenos, Emperor (1119–1142) as co-emperor
- Manuel I Komnenos, Emperor (1118–1180)
- Alexios II Komnenos, Emperor (1180–1183)
- Andronikos I Komnenos, Emperor (1183–1185)
- Isaac II Angelos, Emperor (1185–1195)
- Alexios III Angelos, Emperor (1195–1203)

- Duklja (complete list) –

- Constantine Bodin, King (1081–1101)
- Mihailo II, King (1101–1102)
- Dobroslav II, King (1101–1102)
- Kočopar, Prince (1102–1103)
- Vladimir, King (1103–1113)
- Đorđe Bodinović, King (1113–1118, 1125–1131)
- Grubeša, vassal Prince (1118–1125)
- Gradinja, vassal ruler (1131–1148)
- Radoslav, vassal Prince (c.1146–c.1148/1162)
- Mihailo III, Prince (1165/75–1186/89)

- Grand Principality of Serbia (complete list) –

- Vukan, Grand Prince (1091–1112)
- Uroš I, Grand Prince (1112–1145)
- Uroš II, Grand Prince (1145–1161)
- Desa, Grand Prince (1149–1155, 1162–1166)
- Beloš, Grand Prince (1162)
- Tihomir, Grand Prince (1166)
- Stefan Nemanja, Grand Prince (1166–1196)
- Stefan the First-Crowned, Grand Prince (1196–1202, 1204–1217), King (1217–1228)

=== Europe: British Isles ===
Great Britain: Scotland

- Kingdom of Scotland/ Kingdom of Alba (complete list) –

- Edgar, King (1097–1107)
- Alexander I, King (1107–1124)
- David I, King (1124–1153)
- Malcolm IV, King (1153–1165)
- William I the Lion, King (1165–1214)

- Kingdom of Strathclyde (complete list) –

- Máel Coluim II, King (c.1054)
- David, Prince of the Cumbrians (1113–1124), King of the Scots (1124–1153)

- Kingdom of the Isles (complete list) –

- Magnus Barefoot, King (1098–1102)
- Sigurd the Crusader, King (1102–1103)
- Lǫgmaðr Guðrøðarson, King (c.1100)
- Domnall mac Taidc, King (1111–c.1115)
- Óláfr Guðrøðarson (died 1153), King (1112/1115–1153)
- Somerled), King (1158–1164)

- Kingdom of the Isles: Mann and the North Isles (complete list) –

- Rǫgnvaldr Óláfsson, King (fl.1164)
- Guðrøðr Óláfsson, King (1153/1154–1156, 1164–1187)
- Rǫgnvaldr Guðrøðarson, King (1187–1226)

- Kingdom of the Isles: The South Isles (complete list) –

- Dubgall mac Somairle, King (?–c.1175)
- Ragnall mac Somairle, King (1164–1207)

Great Britain: England

- Kingdom of England (complete list) –

- Henry I, King (1100–1135)
- Stephen, King (1135–1154)
- Matilda, Queen claimant (1141–1148)
- Henry II, King (1154–1189)
- Henry the Young King, junior King (1170–1183)
- Richard I, King (1189–1199)
- John, King of England (1199–1216), Lord of Ireland (1177–1216)

Great Britain: Wales

- Kingdom of Gwynedd (complete list) –

- Gruffydd ap Cynan, King (1081–1137)
- Owain Gwynedd, King (1137–1170)
- Hywel ab Owain Gwynedd, King (1170)

- Kingdom of Powys (complete list) –

- Iorwerth ap Bleddyn, Prince (1075–1103)
- Cadwgan ap Bleddyn, Prince (1075–1111)
- Owain ap Cadwgan, Prince (1111–1116)
- Maredudd ap Bleddyn, Prince (1116–1132)
- Madog ap Maredudd, Prince (1132–1160)

- Deheubarth (complete list) –

- Gruffydd ap Rhys, ruler (1116–1137)
- Anarawd ap Gruffydd, ruler (1136–1143)
- Cadell ap Gruffydd, ruler (1143–1151)
- Maredudd ap Gruffydd, ruler (1151–1155)
- The Lord Rhys, ruler (1155–1197)
- Gruffydd ap Rhys II, ruler (1197–1201)
- Maelgwn ap Rhys, ruler (1199–1230)

Ireland

- Ireland (complete list) –

- Muirchertach Ua Briain, High King (?–1119)
- Domnall Ua Lochlainn, High King (?–1121)
- Toirdelbach Ua Conchobair, High King (1119–1156)
- Muirchertach Mac Lochlainn, High King (1156–1166)
- Ruaidrí Ua Conchobair, High King (1166–1198)

- Lordship of Ireland (complete list) –

- John, King of England (1199–1216), Lord of Ireland (1177–1216)

- Kingdom of Ailech (complete list) –

- Domnall Ua Lochlainn, King (1083–1121)
- Conchobar mac Domnaill, King (1121–1128)
- Magnus Ua Lochlainn, King (1128–1129)
- Conchobar mac Domnaill, King (1129–1136)
- Muirchertach Mac Lochlainn, King (1136–1143)
- Domnall Ua Gairmledaig, King (1143–1145)
- Muirchertach Mac Lochlainn (again), King (1145–1166)
- Conchobar mac Muirchertach Mac Lochlainn, King (1166–1167)
- Niall Mac Lochlainn, King (1167–1176)
- Aed In Macaem Toinlesc Ua Neill, King (1167–1177)
- Mael Sechlainn mac Muirchertaig Mac Lochlainn, King (1177–1185)

- Airgíalla (complete list) –

- Cu Caishil Ua Cerbaill, King (?–1101)
- Giolla Crist Ua hEiccnigh, King (?–1127)
- Donnchadh Ua Cearbaill, King (1130–1168/1169)
- Murchard Ua Cerbaill, King (1168–1189)
- Muirchertach, King (1189–1194)
- unknown king (?–1196)
- Ua Eichnigh, King (?–1201)

- Kingdom of Breifne (complete list) –

- Donnchadh Ó Ruairc, Lord (1101)
- Domnall Ó Ruairc, King (c.1095–1102)
- Cathal Ó Ruairc, Lord (1105)
- Domnall Ó Ruairc, Lord (c.1108)
- Aedh an Gilla Sronmaol Ó Ruairc, King (c.1117–1122)
- Tigernán mór Ó Ruairc, King (c.1124–1152, 1152–1172)
- Aedh Ó Ruairc, King (1152–1152, 1172–1176)
- Amlaíb Ó Ruairc, King (1176–1184)
- Aedh Ó Ruairc, King (1184–1187)

- Connachta (complete list) –

- Domnall Ua Ruairc, King (1097–1102)
- Domnall Ua Conchobair, King (1102–1106)
- Tairrdelbach Ua Conchobair, King (?)
- Ruaidrí Ua Conchobair, King (?)
- Conchobar Ua Conchobair, King (?)
- Donnell Mor Mideach Ua Conchobair, King (?)
- Aedh Dall Ua Conchobair, King (?)
- Máel Ísa Ua Conchobair, King (?)
- Brian Breifneach Ua Conchobair, King (?)
- Maghnus Ua Conchobair, King (?)
- Mór Ní Conchobair, King (?)
- Aed mac Ruaidrí Ua Conchobair, King (?)
- Rose Ní Conchobair, King (?)
- Conchobar Maenmaige Ua Conchobair, King (?)
- Diarmait mac Ruaidrí Ó Conchobair, King (?)
- Muirghis Cananach Ua Conchobhair, King (?)
- Nuala Ní Conchobair, King (?)
- Toirdhealbhach mac Ruaidhrí Ó Conchobhair, King (?)
- Aedh mac Ruaidri Ó Conchobair, King (?)
- Cathal Carragh Ua Conchobair, King (1190–1202)

- Kingdom of Dublin (complete list) –

- Magnus Barefoot, King (1102–1103)
- Diarmait mac Énna meic Murchada, King (?–1117)
- Domnall Gerrlámhach, King (1117–1118)
- Toirdelbach Ua Conchobair, King (1118–)
- Énna Mac Murchada, King (?–1126)
- Conchobar Ua Conchobair, King (1126–1127)
- Conchobar Ua Briain, King (1141–1142)
- Óttar, King (1142–1148)
- Ragnall, King (?–1146)
- Brodar mac Torcaill, King (?–1160)
- Gofraid mac Amlaíb, King (?)
- Ascall mac Ragnaill, King (?–1170)

- Leinster (complete list) –

- Donnchadh mac Murchada, King (1098–1115)
- Conchobar mac Congalaig, King (1115)
- Diarmait mac Énna meic Murchada, King (1115–1117)
- Enna mac Donnchada meic Murchada, King (1117–1126)
- Diarmait mac Murchada, King (1126–1166, 1169–1171)
- Domhnall Caomhánach mac Murchada, King (1171–1175)
- Domhnall Óg mac Domhnall Caomhánach, King (?)

- Magh Luirg (complete list) –

- Tadhg Mor mac Maelruanaidh, King (1120–1124)
- Maelsechlainn mac Tadhg Mor, King (1124)
- Dermot mac Tadhg Mor, King (1124–1159)
- Muirgius mac Tadhg More, King (1159–1187)
- Conchobar MacDermot, King (1187–1196)
- Tomaltach na Cairge MacDermot, King (1196–1207)

- Kingdom of Meath (complete list) –

- Donnchad mac Murchada Ua Mael Sechlainn, King (1094–1105)
- Conchobar mac Mael Sechlainn Ua Mael Sechlainn, King (1094–1105)
- Muirchertach mac Domnaill Ua Mael Sechlainn, King (1105–1106)
- Murchad mac Domnaill Ua Mael Sechlainn, King (1106–1153)
- Mael Sechlainn mac Domnaill Ua Mael Sechlainn, King (1115)
- Domnall mac Murchada Ua Mael Sechlainn, King (1127)
- Diarmait mac Domnaill Ua Mael Sechlainn, King (1127–1130, 1155–1156, 1157–1158, 1160–1169)
- Conchobar Ua Conchobair, King (1143–1144)
- Donnchad mac Muirchertaig Ua Mael Sechlainn, King (1144–?)
- Mael Sechlainn mac Murchada Ua Mael Sechlainn, King (1152–1155)
- Donnchad mac Domnaill Ua Mael Sechlainn, King (1155, 1156–1157, 1158–1160)

- Kingdom of Munster (complete list) –

- Muirchertach Ua Briain, King (1086–1114, 1118–1119)

- Síol Anmchadha (complete list) –

- Gillafin Mac Coulahan, King (1096–1101)
- Diarmaid Ua Madadhan, King (1101–1135)
- Cú Coirne Ua Madudhan, King (1135–1158)
- Madudan Mór Ua Madadhan, King (1158–?)
- Melaghlin Ua Madadhan, King (?–1188)
- Diarmaid Cleirech Ua Madadhan, King (1188–1207)

- Uí Maine (complete list) –

- Aed Ua Cellaigh, King (?–1134)
- Diarmaid Ua Madadhan, King (?–1135)
- Tadhg Ua Cellaigh, King (?–abducted 1145)
- Conchobar Maenmaige Ua Cellaigh, King (?–1180)
- Murrough Ua Cellaigh, King (?–1186)
- Domnall Mór Ua Cellaigh, King (?–1221)

=== Europe: Central ===
Holy Roman Empire in Germany

See also List of state leaders in the 12th-century Holy Roman Empire

- Holy Roman Empire, Kingdom of Germany (complete list, complete list) –

- Henry IV, Holy Roman Emperor (1084–1105), King (1053–1087)
- Henry V, Holy Roman Emperor (1111–1125), King (1099–1125)
- Lothair II, Holy Roman Emperor (1133–1137), King (1125–1137)
- Conrad III, King (1138–1152)
- Henry Berengar, co-King (1138–1150)
- Frederick I, Holy Roman Emperor (1155–1190), King (1152–1190)
- Henry VI, Holy Roman Emperor (1191–1197), King (1190–1197)
- Philip, King (1198–1208)
- Otto IV, Holy Roman Emperor (1209–1215), King (1198–1209)

Hungary

- Kingdom of Hungary (1000–1301) (complete list) –

- Coloman, King (1095–1116)
- Stephen II, King (1116–1131)
- Béla II, King (1131–1141)
- Géza II, King (1141–1162)
- Stephen III, King (1162–1172)
- Ladislaus II, usurper King (1162–1163)
- Stephen IV, usurper King (1163–1165)
- Béla III, King (1172–1196)
- Emeric, King (1196–1204)

Poland

- Kingdom of Poland (complete list) –

- Władysław I Herman, Duke (1079–1102)
- Zbigniew, Duke (1102–1107)
- Bolesław III Wrymouth, Duke (1102–1138)

- Seniorate Province in the Fragmentation of Poland (complete list) –

- Władysław II the Exile, High Duke (1138–1146)
- Bolesław IV the Curly, High Duke (1146–1173)
- Mieszko III the Old, High Duke (1173–1177, 1191, 1198–1199, 1202)
- Casimir II the Just, High Duke (1177–1191, 1191–1194)
- Leszek the White, High Duke (1194–1198, 1199–1202, 1206–1210, 1211–1227)

- Duchy of Opole (complete list) –

- Jarosław Opolski, Duke (1173–1201)

- Duchy of Masovia (complete list) –

- Bolesław the Curly, Duke (1138–1173)
- Leszek I, Duke (1173–1186)
- Casimir II the Just, Duke (1186–1194)
- Helen of Znojmo, Regent (1194–1200)
- Leszek the White, Duke (1194–1200)
- Konrad I, Duke (1200–1247)

- State of the Teutonic Order (complete list) –

- Heinrich Walpot, Grand Master (1198–pre-1208)

=== Europe: East ===
- Kievan Rus' (complete list) –

- Sviatopolk II of Kiev, Grand Prince (1093–1113)
- Vladimir II Monomakh, Grand Prince (1113–1125)
- Mstislav I the Great, Grand Prince (1125–1132)
- Yaropolk II, Grand Prince (1132–1139)
- Viacheslav I, Grand Prince (1139–1139)
- Vsevolod II, Grand Prince (1139–1146)
- Igor II, Grand Prince (1146–1146)
- Iziaslav II, Grand Prince (1146–1149)
- Yuri I Dolgorukiy, Grand Prince (1149–1151)
- Viacheslav I, Grand Prince (1151–1154)
- Iziaslav II, Grand Prince (1151–1154)
- Rostislav I, Grand Prince (1154–1154)
- Iziaslav III, Grand Prince (1154–1155)
- Yuri I Dolgorukiy, Grand Prince (1155–1157)
- Iziaslav III, Grand Prince (1157–1158)
- Rostislav I, Grand Prince (1158–1167)
- Mstislav II, Grand Prince (1167–1169)
- Gleb, Grand Prince (1169–1169)
- Mstislav II, Grand Prince (1170–1170)
- Gleb, Grand Prince (1170–1171)
- Vladimir III, Grand Prince (1171–1171)
- Michael I, Grand Prince (1171–1171)
- Roman I, Grand Prince (1171–1173)
- Vsevolod III the Big Nest, Grand Prince (1173–1173)
- Rurik II, Grand Prince (1173–1173)
- Sviatoslav III, Grand Prince (1174–1174)
- Yaroslav II, Grand Prince (1174–1175)
- Roman I, Grand Prince (1175–1177)
- Sviatoslav III, Grand Prince (1177–1180)
- Yaroslav II, Grand Prince (1180–1180)
- Rurik II, Grand Prince (1180–1182)
- Sviatoslav III, Grand Prince (1182–1194)
- Rurik II, Grand Prince (1194–1202)

- Vladimir-Suzdal (complete list) –

- Andrei I, Grand Duke (1157–1174)
- Mikhail I, Grand Duke (1174, 1175–1176)
- Yaropolk, Grand Duke (1174–1175)
- Vsevolod the Big Nest, Grand Duke (1176–1212)

=== Europe: Nordic ===
Denmark

- Denmark (complete list) –

- Eric, King (1095–1103)
- Niels, King (?)
- Eric II, King (?)
- Eric III, King (?)
- Sweyn III, King (?) / Canute V, King (?) / Valdemar I, King (?)
- Canute VI, King (1182–1202)

- Duchy of Schleswig (complete list) –

- Valdemar II of Denmark, Duke (1183–1216)

Norway

- Kingdom of Norway (872–1397) (complete list) –

- Magnus III Barefoot, King (1093–1103)
- Olaf Magnusson, King (1103–1115)
- Eystein I, King (1103–1123)
- Sigurd I the Crusader, King (1103–1130)
- Harald Gille, King (1130–1136)
- Magnus IV of Norway, King (1130–1135, 1137–1139)
- Sigurd II, King (1136–1155)
- Inge I, King (1136–1161)
- Eystein II, King (1142–1157)
- Magnus Haraldsson, King (1142–1145)
- Haakon II, King (1157–1162)
- Magnus V, King (1161–1184)
- Sverre, King (1184–1202)

Sweden

- Sweden (800–1521) (complete list) –

- Inge the Elder, King (c.1079–c.1084, c.1087–c.1105/10)
- Filip Halstensson, King (c.1105/10–1118)
- Inge the Younger, King (c.1110–c.1125)
- Ragnvald Knaphövde, King (1125–1126)
- Magnus Nilsson, King of Götaland (1120s–c.1132)
- Sverker I, King (c.1132–1156)
- Erik Jedvardsson, King (1156–1160)
- Magnus Henriksson, King (1160–1161)
- Karl Sverkersson, King (1161–1167)
- Kol and Boleslaw, contender Kings (1167–1173)
- Knut Eriksson, King (1167–1196)
- Sverker II, King (1195/96–1208)

=== Europe: Southcentral ===
See also List of state leaders in the 12th-century Holy Roman Empire#Italy

- Kingdom of Italy (Holy Roman Empire) (complete list) –

- Henry V, King (1098–1125)
- Lothair III, King (1125–1137)
- Conrad III, King (1138–1152)
- Frederick I, King (1154–1186)
- Henry VI, King (1186–1197)

- March of Montferrat (complete list) –

- Rainier, Marquis (c.1100–c.1136)
- William V, Marquis (c.1136–1191)
- Conrad, Marquis (1191–1192)
- Boniface I, Marquis (1192–1207)

- Papal States (complete list) –

- Paschal II, Pope (1099–1118)
- Gelasius II, Pope (1118–1119)
- Callixtus II, Pope (1119–1124)
- Honorius II, Pope (1124–1130)
- Innocent II, Pope (1130–1143)
- Celestine II, Pope (1143–1144)
- Lucius II, Pope (1144–1145)
- Eugene III, Pope (1145–1153)
- Anastasius IV, Pope (1153–1154)
- Adrian IV, Pope (1154–1159)
- Alexander III, Pope (1159–1181)
- Lucius III, Pope (1181–1185)
- Urban III, Pope (1185–1187)
- Gregory VIII, Pope (1187)
- Clement III, Pope (1187–1191)
- Celestine III, Pope (1191–1198)
- Innocent III, Pope (1198–1216)

- Duchy of Spoleto (complete list) –

- Werner II, Duke (1093–1119)
- Engelbert III of Sponheim, Duke (1135–1137)
- Henry the Proud, Duke (1137–1139)
- Ulrich of Attems, imperial vicar (1139–1152)
- Welf VI, Duke (1152–1160)
- Welf VII, Duke (1160–1167)
- Welf VI, Duke (1167–1173)
- Ridelulf, Duke (1173–1183)
- Conrad I, Duke (1183–1190, 1195–1198)
- Pandulf II, Duke (1190–1195), vassal Duke (1198–1205)

- March of Tuscany (complete list) –

- Matilda, Margravine (1076–1115)
- Rabodo, Margrave (1116–1119)
- Conrad, Margrave (1119/20–1129/31)
- Rampret, Margrave (c.1131)
- Engelbert, Margrave (1134/35–1137)
- Henry the Proud, Margrave (1137–1139)
- Ulrich of Attems, imperial vicar (1139–1152)
- Welf VI, Margrave (1152–1160)
- Welf VII, Margrave (1160–1167)
- Rainald of Dassel, imperial vicar (1160–1163)
- Christian of Buch, imperial vicar (1163–1173)
- Welf VI, Margrave (1167–1173)
- Philip, Margrave (1195–1197)

- Republic of Venice (complete list) –

- Vitale I Michiel, Doge (1096–1102)
- Ordelafo Faliero, Doge (1102–1117)
- Domenico Michele, Doge (1117–1130)
- Pietro Polani, Doge (1130–1148)
- Domenico Morosini, Doge (1148–1156)
- Vital II Michele, Doge (1156–1172)
- Sebastiano Ziani, Doge (1172–1178)
- Orio Mastropiero, Doge (1178–1192)
- Enrico Dandolo, Doge (1192–1205)

==== Southern Italy ====
Southern Italy

- County/ Duchy of Apulia and Calabria (complete list) –

- Roger I Borsa, Duke (1085–1111)
- William II, Duke (1111–1127)

- Duchy of Gaeta (complete list) –

- Landulf, Duke (1091–1103)
- William II, Duke (1103–1104/1105)
- Richard II, Duke (1104/1105–1111)
- Andrew, Duke (1111–1112)
- Jonathan, Duke (1112–1121)
- Richard III, Duke (1121–1140)

- Duchy of Naples (complete list) –

- Sergius VI, Duke (1077–1107)
- John VI, Duke (1090–1122)
- Sergius VII, Duke (1122–1137)
- Alfonso, Duke (1139–1144)
- William, Duke (1144–1154)

- County of Sicily (complete list) –

- Roger I, Count (1071–1101)
- Simon, Count (1101–1105)
- Roger II, Count (1105–1130), King (1130–1154)

- Kingdom of Sicily (complete list) –

- Roger II, Count (1105–1130), King (1130–1154)
- William I, King (1154–1166)
- William II, King (1166–1189)
- Tancred, King (1189–1194)
- Roger III, King (1192–1193)
- William III, King (1194)
- Constance, Queen (1194–1198)
- Henry I, King (1194–1197)
- Frederick I, King (1198–1250)

- Principality of Taranto (complete list) –

- Bohemond I, Count (1085–1088), Prince (1088–1111)
- Bohemond II, Prince (1111–1128)
- Roger II, Prince (1128–1132)
- Tancred, Prince (1132–1138)
- William I, Prince (1138–1144)
- Simon, Prince (1144–1157)
- William II, Prince (1157–1189)
- Tancred of Sicily, Prince (1189–1194)
- William III, Prince (1194)
- Henry, Prince (1194–1198)
- Robert, Prince (1198–1200)
- Walter III of Brienne, Prince (1200–1205)

=== Europe: Southwest ===
Iberian Peninsula: Christian

- Kingdom / Crown of Aragon (complete list) –

- Peter I, King (1094–1104)
- Alfonso I the Battler, King (1104–1134)
- Ramiro II the Monk, King (1134–1137)
- Petronilla, Queen (1137–1164)
- Alfonso II, King (1164–1196)
- Peter II, King (1196–1213)

- Kingdom of Castile (complete list) –

- Alfonso VI the Brave, King (1072–1109)
- Urraca the Reckless, King (1109–1126)
- Alfonso VII the Emperor, King (1126–1157)
- Sancho III the Desired, King (1157–1158)
- Alfonso VIII the Noble, King (1158–1214)

- County of Barcelona (complete list) –

- Ramon Berenguer III, Count (1082–1131)
- Ramon Berenguer IV, Count (1131–1162)
- Alphonse I, Count (1164–1196)
- Peter II, Count (1196–1213)

- Kingdom of Navarre (complete list) –

- Peter I, King (1094–1104)
- Alfonso I, King (1104–1134)
- García Ramírez IV, King (1134–1150)
- Sancho VI, King (1150–1194)
- Sancho VII, King (1194–1234)

- County of Portugal (complete list) –

- Henry, Count (1096–1112)
- Teresa, Countess (1112–1128), self-styled Queen from 1116
- Afonso, Count, later King (1128–1139)

- Kingdom of Portugal (complete list) –

- Afonso I, King (1139–1185)
- Sancho I, King (1185–1212)

Marca Hispanica

- County of Osona (complete list) –

- Jimena, Count (1107–1149)
- Bernard, Count (1107–1111)

- County of Cerdanya (complete list) –

- William II, Count (1095–1109)
- Bernard, Count (1109–1118)
- Raymond Berengar I, Count (1118–1131)
- Raymond Berengar II, Count (1131–1162)
- Peter, Count (1162–1168)
- Sancho I, Count (1168–1223)

- County of Urgell (complete list) –

- Ermengol V of Mollerussa, Count (1092–1102)
- Ermengol VI of Castile, Count (1102–1153/1154)
- Ermengol VII of Valencia, Count (1153/1154–1184)
- Ermengol VIII of Sant Hilari, Count (1184–1208/1209)

=== Europe: West ===
France

- Kingdom of France (complete list) –

- Philip I the Amorous, King (1060–1108)
- Louis VI the Fat, King (1108–1137)
- Louis VII the Young, King (1137–1180)
- Philip II Augustus, King (1180–1223)

- County of Angoulême (complete list) –

- William V (Taillefer III), Count (1087–1120)
- Wulgrin II, Count (1120–1140)
- William VI (Taillefer IV), Count (1140–1179)
- Wulgrin III, Count (1179–1181)
- William VII (Taillefer V), Count (1181–1186)
- Aymer III, Count (1186–1202)

- Anjou (complete list) –

- Geoffrey IV, Count (1103–1106)
- Geoffrey V, Count (1129–1151)
- Henry, Count (1151–1189)
- Richard, Count (1189–1199)

- Duchy of Aquitaine (complete list) –

- William IX, Duke (1086–1127)
- William X, Duke (1127–1137)
- Eleanor of Aquitaine, Duke (1137–1204)
- Louis the Younger, Duke (1137–1152)
- Henry I, Duke (1152–1189)
- Richard I Lionheart, Duke (1189–1199)
- John I, Duke (1199–1216)

- County of Artois (complete list) –

- Isabella, Countess (1180–1190)
- Louis VIII of France, Count (1190–1223)

- Auvergne (complete list) –

- William VI, Count (1096–1136)
- Robert III, Count (1136–1143)
- William VII the Young, Count (1143–c.1155)
- William VIII the Old, Count (1155–1182)
- Robert IV, Count (1182–1194)
- William IX, Count (1194–1195)
- Guy II, Count (1195–1224)

- County of Boulogne (complete list) –

- Eustace III, ruler (1087–1125)
- Matilda I, Countess (1125–1151)
- Eustace IV, Count (1151–1153)
- William I, Count (1153–1159)
- Mary I, Countess (1159–1170)
- Matthew, Count (1170–1173)
- Matthew II, Count (1173–1180)
- Gerard, Count (1181–1182)
- Berthold, Count (1183–1186)
- Ida, Countess (1173–1216)

- Bourbonnais (complete list) –

- Aymon II de Bourbon, Lord (1116–1120)
- Archambaud VII de Bourbon, Lord (1120–1171)
- Mathilde Ire de Bourbon, Lady (1171–1218)

- Duchy of Brittany (complete list) –

- Alan IV, Duke (1072–1112)
- Conan III, Duke (1112–1148)
- Bertha, Duchess (1148–1156)
- Odo II, Duke (1148–1156)
- Conan IV, Duke (1156–1166)
- Constance, Duchess (1166–1201)
- Geoffrey II, Duke (1181–1186),
- Guy of Thouars, Duke (1199–1201)
- Arthur I, Duke (1196–1203)

- Duchy of Burgundy (complete list) –

- Odo I, Duke (1079–1103)
- Hugh II, Duke (1103–1143)
- Odo II, Duke (1143–1162)
- Hugh III, Duke (1162–1192)
- Odo III, Duke (1192–1218)

- County of Champagne (complete list) –

- Hugh, Count (1102–1125)
- Theobald II, Count (1125–1152)
- Henry I, Count (1152–1181)
- Henry II, Count (1181–1197)
- Theobald III, Count (1197–1201)

- County of Flanders (complete list) –

- Robert II, Count (1093–1111)
- Baldwin VII Hapkin, Count (1111–1119)
- Charles I the Good, Count (1119–1127)
- William I Clito, Count (1127–1128)
- Theodoric, Count (1128–1168)
- Philip I, Count (1168–1191)
- Margaret I, Countess (1191–1194)
- Baldwin VIII, Count (1191–1194)
- Baldwin IX, Count (1194–1205)

- Duchy of Gascony (complete list) –

- William IX, Duke (1086–1126)
- William X, Duke (1126–1137)
- Eleanor of Aquitaine, Duchess (1137–1204)

- County of Maine (complete list) –

- Elias I, Count (1093–1110)
- Eremburga and Fulk V of Anjou, Countess and Count (1110–1126)
- Geoffrey of Anjou, Count (1126–1151)
- Elias II, Count (1151)
- Henry II of England, Count (1151–1189)

- Henry the Young King, Count (1169–1183)

- Richard the Lionheart, Count (1189–1199)
- Arthur I of Brittany, Count (1186–1203)

- County of Nevers (complete list) –

- William II, Count (1097–1148)
- William III, Count (1148–1161)
- William IV, Count (1161–1168)
- Guy, Count (1168–1175)
- William V, Count (1175–1181)
- Agnes I, Countess (1181–1192)
- Peter II of Courtenay, Count (1184–1192)
- Matilda I, Countess (1192–1257)
- Hervé IV of Donzy, Count (1199–1223)

- County of Poitou (complete list) –

- William VII, Count (1071–1126)
- William VIII, Count (1099–1137)
- Eleanor, Countess (1137–1189)
- Louis VII of France, Count (1137–1152)
- Henry II of England, Count (1152, 1156–1189)
- William IX, Count (1153–1156)
- Richard I, Count (1169–1196)
- Otto, Count (1196–1198)
- Richard I, Count (1198–1199)

- Provence / Lower Burgundy (complete list) –

- Gerberga, Countess (1093–1112)
- Douce I, Countess (1112–1127)

- County of Toulouse (complete list) –

- Raymond IV (VI) of St Gilles, Count (1094–1105)
- Philippa & William IX, Countess & Count (1098–1101, 1109–1117)
- Bertrand of Tripoli, Count (1105–1109)
- William IX of Aquitaine, Count (1117–1120)
- Alfonso Jordan, Count (1109–1148)
- Raymond V (VII), Count (1148–1194)
- Raymond VI (VIII), Count (1194–1222)

- County of Vermandois (complete list) –

- Adelaide, Countess (1085–1101)

=== Eurasia: Caucasus ===
- Kingdom of Georgia (complete list) –

- David IV, King (1089–1125)
- Demetrius I, King (1125–1154, 1155–1156)
- David V, King (1154–1155)
- George III, King (1156–1184)
- Tamar the Great, Queen (1178–1213)

- First Kingdom of Kakheti (complete list) –

- Kvirike IV, King (1084–1102)
- Aghsartan II, King (1102–1105)

Atabegs of Azerbaijan (complete list) –

Shamsaddin Eldiguz, Atabeg (1136–1175)

Muhammad Jahan Pahlavan, Atabeg (1175–1186)

Qizil Arslan, Atabeg (1186–1191)

Nusrat al-Din Abu Bakr, Atabeg (1191–1210)

Muzaffar al-Din Uzbek, Atabeg (1210–1225)

== Oceania ==
Chile: Easter Island

- Easter Island (complete list) –

- Te Ria Kautahito (Hirakau-Tehito?), King (?)
- Ko Te Pu I Te Toki, King (?)
- Kuratahogo, King (?)
- Ko Te Hiti Rua Nea, King (?)
- Te Uruaki Kena, King (?)
- Tu Te Rei Manana, King (c.1200)

Tonga

- Tuʻi Tonga Empire (complete list) –

- ʻApuanea, King (?)
- ʻAfulunga, King (?)
- Momo, King (c.1100)
- Tuʻitātui, King (c.1100)
- Talatama, King (?)
- Tuʻitonganui ko e Tamatou, King (?)

United States: Hawaii

- Island of Hawaiʻi (complete list) –

- Kapawa, supreme high chief (?)
- Pilikaʻaeia, supreme high chief (1125–1155)
- Kukohou, supreme high chief (1155–1185)
- Kaniuhu, supreme high chief (1185–1215)
