= Domhnall Ó Madadhan =

Domhnall Ó Madadhan, chief of Síol Anmchadha, fl. 1567 – after 8 March 1611.

Domhnall was the grandson of Breasal Ó Madadhan (died 1526) and a son of John Ó Madadhan, chief from 1554 to 1556. In 1567 he surrendered his Gaelic title and was in return appointed Captain of his Nation by letters patent from Elizabeth I. He thus became the first of the Madden family chiefs to recognise English law instead of Gaelic Brehon law, in return for crown protection of his title to his lands.

He attended the 1585 Parliament at Dublin. Despite most of the family rebelling during the Nine Years' War (Ireland), Domhnall himself did not participate. He was nevertheless lucky to escape the slaughter at Lusmagh Castle on 12 March 1595. During the winter of 1602–03 he attacked the followers of Dónall Cam Ó Súilleabháin Béirre. When he drew up his will on 8 March 1611 he did it under English law, settling his estate upon his eldest son while reserving some smaller properties for his younger sons and other heirs.

By his wife, Morne na Maigh O'Kelly of Creagh Castle (Ballinasloe) he had the following known issue:

- Anmchadh, called Ambrose, c. 1560 – 15 September 1636
- Malachy
- Donell

== Pedigree of Domhnall ==
- Domhnall son of
- John son of
- Breasal son of
- Eoghan son of
- Murchadh Reagh son of
- Eoghan Carrach son of
- Murchadh son of
- Eoghan Mór son of
- Murchadh son of
- Eoghan Ó Madadhan son of
- Murchadh of Magh Bealaigh son of
- Cathal son of
- Madudan Óg son of
- Madudan Mór son of
- Diarmaid son of
- Madudan Reamhar Ua Madadhan son of
- Diarmaid mac Madudan son of
- Madudan mac Gadhra Mór son of
- Gadhra Mór mac Dundach son of
- Dundach son of
- Loingseach son of
- Dunadhach of Sadinn son of
- Cobhtach of Grian son of
- Donnghallach son of
- Anmchadh mac Eogan Buac

Preceded by John Ó Madadhan	Lord of Síol Anmchadha; 1567-after 1611	Succeeded by Title vacant

Preceded by John Ó Madadhan	Chief of The Name; 1567–1612	Succeeded by Anmchadh Ó Madadhan
