= 11th century in Ireland =

Events from the 11th century in Ireland.

== 1000s ==
1002

- Máel Sechnaill mac Domnaill, without a battle, yields to Brian Boru, King of Munster who, effectively becomes High King of Ireland and reigns until his death in 1014.
- Brian Boru makes an expedition to the north to take hostages from the northern states.

1005

- Brian Boru makes a second expedition to the north to take hostages from the northern states: during this expedition, he visits Armagh, making an offering of twenty ounces of gold to the church and confirming to the apostolic see of Saint Patrick, ecclesiastical supremacy over the whole of Ireland (as recorded in the Book of Armagh).
- Death of Mael Ruanaidh Ua Dubhda, King of Uí Fiachrach Muaidhe.

1006

- Brian Boru makes a triumphal progress around Leath Cuinn, taking hostages from every northern state, thus demonstrating he is undisputed High King of Ireland.
- Death of Cú Connacht mac Dundach.

1007

- The Book of Kells is probably stolen from the Abbey of Kells in County Meath for several months.

1008

- Gadhra Mór mac Dundach becomes chief of Síol Anmchadha.
- Death of Madudan mac Gadhra Mór.

== 1010s ==
1012

- King of Leinster, Máel Mórda mac Murchada, rises in revolt against High King Brian Boru.

1013

- Brian Boru campaigns against the Vikings of Dublin under their King Sigtrygg Silkbeard and North Leinster led by Máel Mórda Mac Murchada, following attacks by them on Brian's ally Máel Sechnaill mac Domnaill.

1014

- 23 April: Battle of Clontarf, at which Norse–Gaels led by Sigtrygg and men of North Leinster are defeated by Brian Boru, who is killed in the battle as is Máel Mórda mac Murchada.

1015

- Gadhra Mór mac Dundach becomes chief of Uí Maine.

1016

- Niall mac Eochada becomes king of Ulaid.

1017

- Death of lawyer Cass Midhe.

== 1020s ==
1021

- Death of Mac Cú Ceanain, King of Uí Díarmata.

1022

- Niall mac Eochada defeats the Dublin Norse at sea.
- Death of Máel Sechnaill mac Domnaill (Mael Seachnaill II), Overking of the Uí Néill since 980, and High King of Ireland since the death of Brian Boru in 1014.

1023

- Death of Tadc mac Briain, son of Brian Boru

1024 and 1026

- Niall mac Eochada invades Dublin and take hostages.

1027

- Death of Gadhra Mór mac Dundach, King of Síol Anmchadha and Uí Maine.

== 1030s ==
1030

- Death of Gormflaith (b. 960), daughter of Murchad mac Find, King of Leinster, and third wife of Brian Ború.

1035

- Ragnall ua Ímair, King of Waterford slain by Sigtrygg Silkbeard.

1036

- Sigtrygg Silkbeard driven out of Dublin by Echmarcach mac Ragnaill.

1038

- First cathedral built in Dublin.
- Echmarcach mac Ragnaill driven out of Dublin by Ímar mac Arailt, who then reigns as king.

== 1040s ==
1041

- Death of Mac Beathaidh mac Ainmire, poet and Chief Ollam of Ireland.

1042

- Death of Sigtrygg Silkbeard.

1046

- Ímar mac Arailt is expelled from Dublin by Echmarcach mac Ragnaill, who then reigns as king.

== 1050s ==
1052

- Echmarcach mac Ragnaill, King of Dublin is expelled from the town.

1054

- 30 April: A tornado hits Ros-deala (in modern County Westmeath)

== 1060s ==
1064

- Donnchad, son of Brian Boru, dies in Rome, after being dethroned by his nephew.

1069

- Madudan Reamhar Ua Madadhan becomes Chief of Síol Anmchadha.

== 1070s ==
1070

- Death of Murchad mac Diarmata, a king of Leinster and Dublin, and a son of Diarmait mac Mail na mBo.

1072

- Death of Diarmait mac Mail na mBo, a king of Leinster and a contender for the title of High King of Ireland. He is one of the most important and significant Kings in Ireland in the pre-Norman era.

1075

- In a campaign against the Uí Néill and their allies in the north, Muirchertach Ua Briain (son of Toirdelbach) is defeated by the Airgíalla near Áth Fhirdia (modern Ardee, County Louth) with heavy loss.

1079

- Five Jews come from "over the sea" bringing gifts to Toirdelbach Ua Briain, King of Munster.

== 1080s ==
1080

- Birth of Saint Ceallach (Celsus), (d 1129), future abbot of Armagh. He will preside at the synod of Rathbreasail in 1111.

1081

- Gruffudd ap Cynan, Irish-born claimant to the Kingdom of Gwynedd, sails from Waterford to St David's with an army of Hiberno-Normans to enforce his claim.

1086

- Muirchertach Ua Briain becomes King of Munster and claimant to the Kingship of Ireland, and reigns until 1119.

1088

- Birth of Tairrdelbach Ua Conchobair, King of Connacht and High King of Ireland (d. 1156).

== 1090s ==
1095

- Death of Madudan Reamhar Ua Madadhan, Chief of Síol Anmchadha.
- Birth of Saint Malachy (Middle Irish: Máel Máedóc Ua Morgair; Modern Irish: Maelmhaedhoc Ó Morgair).

1096

- Máel Ísu Ua hAinmere is consecrated the first Bishop of Waterford by Saint Anselm of Canterbury.
