= Murchadh =

The name Murchadh in Gaelic type

Murchadh is a masculine given name of Irish origin. It is composed of the elements muir, meaning "sea", and cath, meaning "battle". Murrough is an anglicized form. The surname Murphy (Irish: Ó Murchadha) is derived from the given name.

== People with the given name ==
=== Murchad ===
- Murchad mac Áedo, king of Connacht
- Murchad mac Brain Mut (died 727), king of Leinster
- Murchad mac Brian Ó Flaithbheartaigh (1419), Irish chieftain
- Murchad mac Diarmata, king of Leinster, Dublin, and the Isles
- Murchad mac Flaithbertaig (died 767), chief of the Cenél Conaill
- Murchad mac Flann mac Glethneachan (fl. 973), king of Maigh Seóla
- Murchad mac Máele Dúin (fl. 819–833), king of Ailech
- Murchad Midi (died 715), king of Uisnech
- Murchad Ua Flaithbertaig (fl. c.1202-1241), bishop of Annaghdown,
- Murchad mac Briain, son of Brian Boru who died at the Battle of Clontarf

=== Murchadh ===
- Murchadh an Chapail Ua Flaithbheartaigh, (died 1036), a king of Maigh Seóla / Iar Connacht
- Murchadh mac Aodha, (died 960), king of Uí Maine
- Murchadh mac Maenach (died 891), king of Maigh Seóla
- Murchadh mac Sochlachan, (died 936), king of Uí Maine
- Murchadh Mac Suibhne, (died 1267), Norse-Gaelic nobleman
- Murchadh Ó Cuindlis, (fl. 1398-1411) Irish scribe
- Murchadh Ó Madadhain, (fl. 1347-1371), chief of Síol Anmchadha
- Murchadh Ó Madadhan, (1327), king of Síol Anmchadha
- Murchadh Reagh Ó Madadhan, (d. 1475), chief of Síol Anmchadha

== See also ==
- List of Irish-language given names
