= Madin (surname) =

Madin is a surname. Notable people with the name include:

- Billy Madin, English footballer
- Henry Madin (1698–1748), French composer
- John Madin (1924–2012), English architect
- Jon Madin (born 1949), music teacher in Australia
- Laurence Madin, American marine biologist

== See also ==
- Maddin, surname
