= Ballylarkin Church =

- Ballylarkin Abbey
- Cill Bhaile Uí Lorcáin
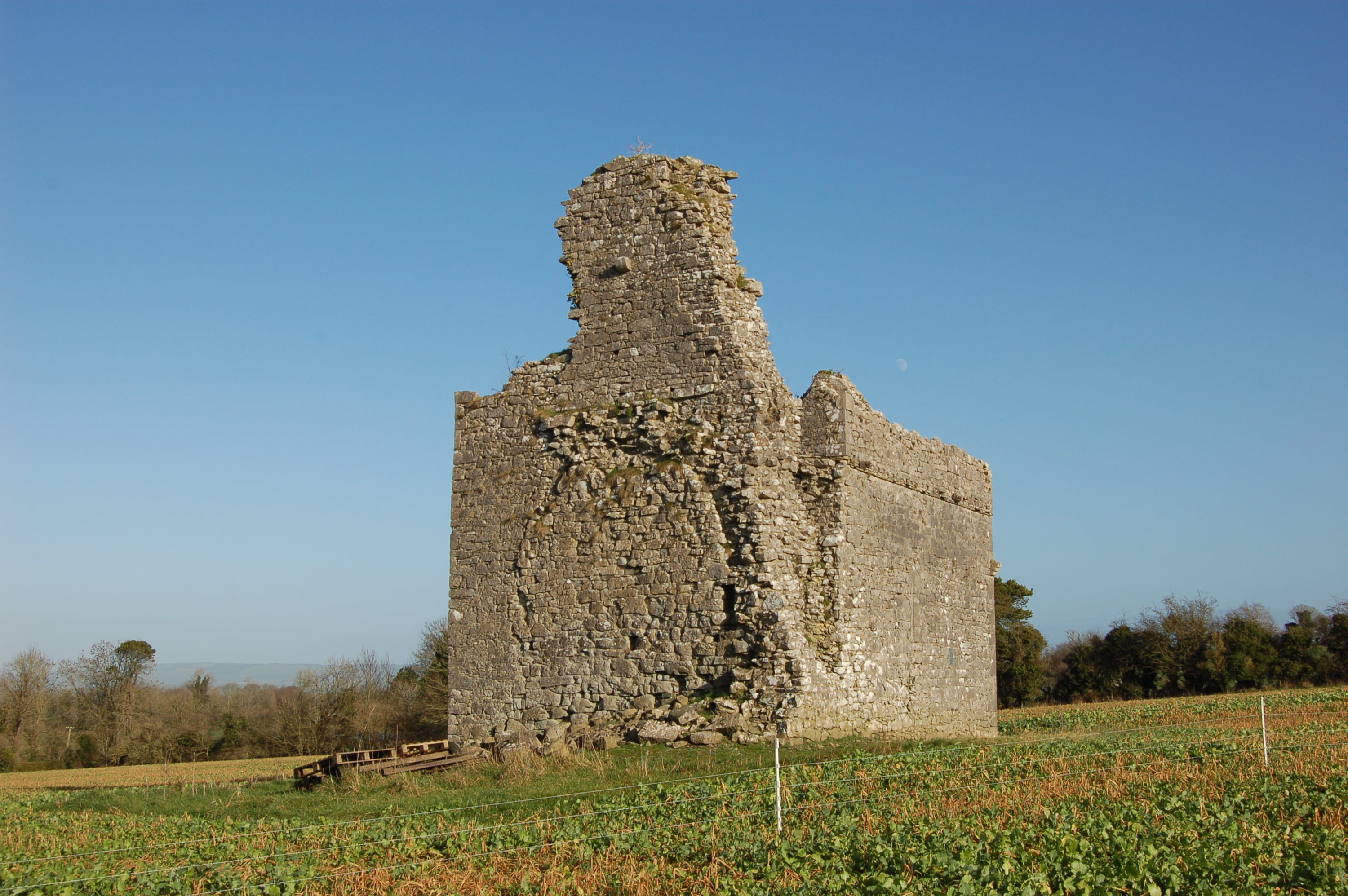

- Location within Ireland
- 52.722862°N 7.427552°W
- Location: Ballylarkin Upper, Freshford, County Kilkenny
- Country: Ireland
- Denomination: Church of Ireland
- Previous denomination: Pre-Reformation Catholic

Architecture
- Functional status: inactive
- Style: Late Gothic
- Years built: 1350

Specifications
- Length: 7.9 m (26 ft)
- Width: 5.8 m (19 ft)
- Materials: stone

Administration
- Diocese: Ossory

National monument of Ireland
- Official name: Ballylarkin Church
- Reference no.: 282

Ballylarkin Church, also called Ballylarkin Abbey, is a medieval church and National Monument in County Kilkenny, Ireland.

== Location ==
Ballylarkin Church is located beside the road, 2.3 km (1.4 mi) southwest of Freshford.

== History ==
The region was controlled by the Ó Lorcáin until they were ousted by the Anglo-Norman Shorthalls (Schortal) in 1326. James Schortal and his wife Catherine White built the church, a small single-room structure, at Ballylarkin in 1350.

A triple sedilia was later inserted into the south wall in the 14th century. A sheela-na-gig was originally at Ballylarkin but has been moved to the National Museum of Ireland – Archaeology.

== Church ==
It is an undivided parish church (i.e. no division between nave and chancel) with some unusual features. The entrance is through a gate (added in 2025 by the OPW) and squeezer stile built into the original doorway at the West end of the North wall. The original doorway was chamfered, and run-out stops are still visible on the exterior.

The East window tracery is missing and was either destroyed in a limekiln (according to Carrigan) or re-used in St Lachtain's Church (of Ireland) in Freshford (according to locals). At least three window fragments lie on the floor within the church, one having punch dressing. This was a Gothic window, and some of the voussoirs are still surviving in situ.

A memorial stone (KK013-018005-) is built into the internal East window sill. It is not described by Carrigan in 1905, so must have been added after his publication. It commemorates the work done on the land and the buildings in 1551.

There are two corbels in different designs on the internal East gable, maybe once holding statues. One of them has similarities to the odd corbel in the North wall and to the two external corbels in the Southeast and Northeast corner of the church.

Externally, the East gable is quite steep, but walls have been built up on either side for the chemin de ronde or wall walk.

There is a triple sedilia in the internal south wall. Beside the sedilia is a piscina with quatrefoil basin. There is an ambry beside the east window.

Along the top of the north and south walls is a series of corbel-stones with tracery, one in the North wall not following that pattern.

An ogee-headed window is built into the South wall; there is no window in the North wall.

There are hanging eyes built into the South and North wall towards the East end of the church internally with chamfered edges and spear stops.

Corbels at the West end of the internal South wall might have once carried a partial loft, but there are no corbels on the North side, so maybe it was held by timber uprights. In the internal North wall could have been a tomb niche. Part of a possible effigy is reused as a coping stone for the roof in the internal West gable, another one was/ is built into a gatepost nearby (KK013-018006-).

It is believed that there was a tower house attached to the church on the West gable; one corbel once supporting the second floor survives externally in the West gable.

== Gallery ==
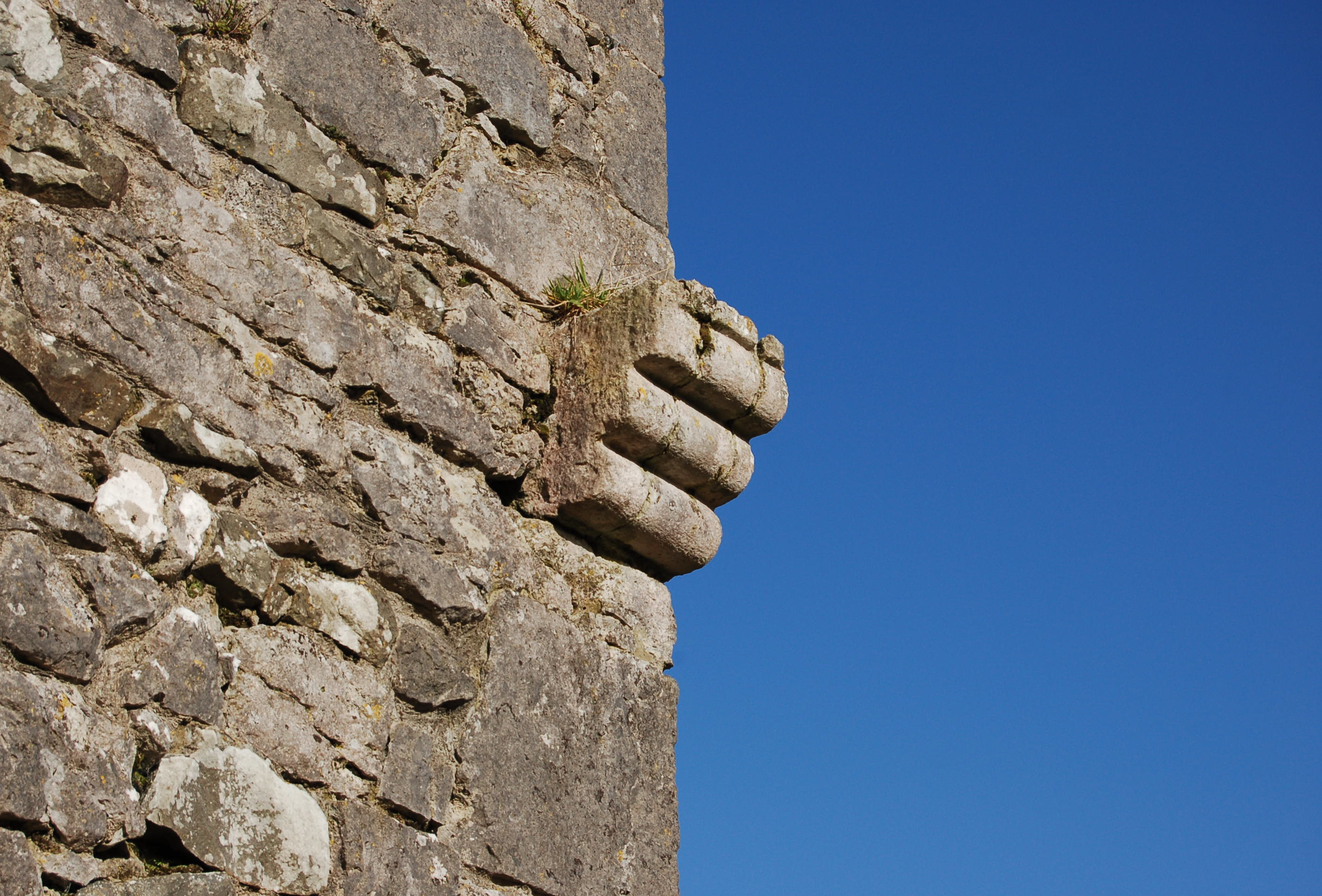
Corbel in outside wall

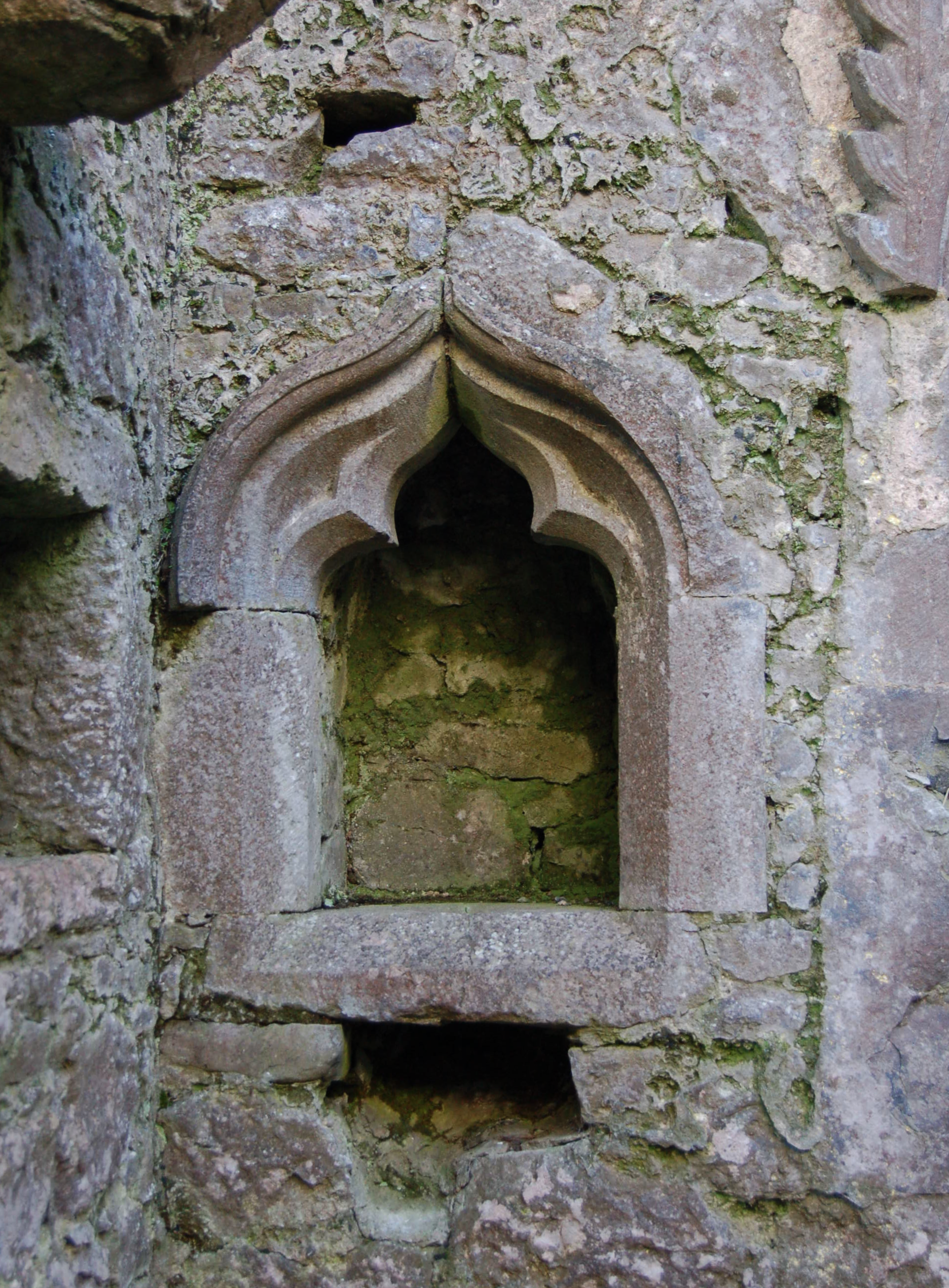
Piscina

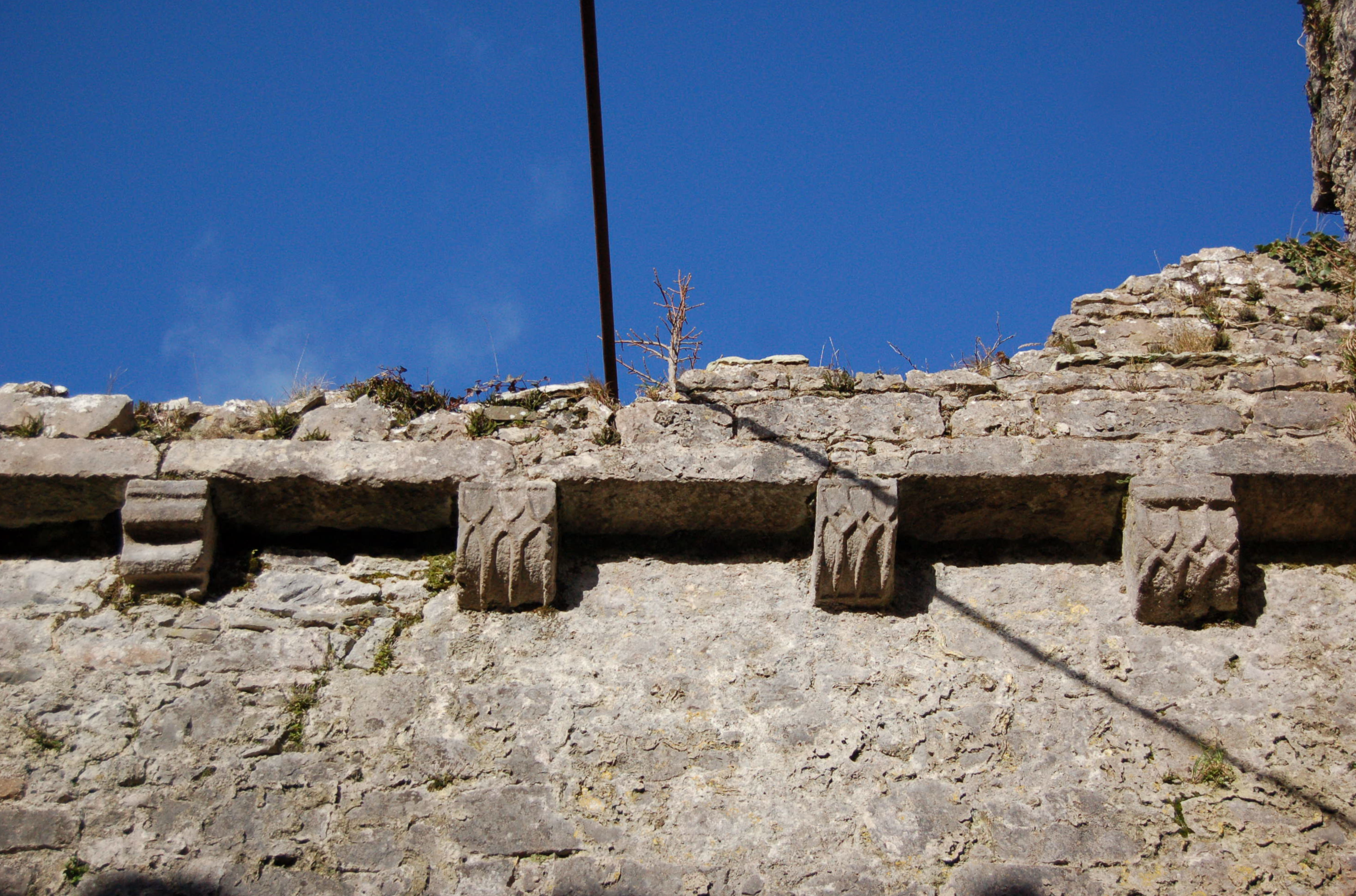
Gothic corbels
