= Ó Lorcáin =

Ó Lorcáin (Larkin) was the surname of an Irish brehon family.

Natives of Síol Anmchadha in what is now south-east County Galway, members of the family were ollamhs to the Ó Madadhan. At least one member of the family became a clerk for the Tribes of Galway by c. 1500.

- M1490.15 ... Thomas O'Lorcan, intended Ollav to O'Madden ... died.
