= Dogra mac Dúnadach =

King of Síol Anmchadha (died 1027)

Dogra mac Dúnadach, King of Síol Anmchadha, died 1027.

== Biography ==
The Annals of Ulster, sub anno 1027, relate that:

"Tadc son of Gilla Pátraic was blinded by Donnchad son of Gilla Pátraic, king of Osraige. Brian's son led an expedition into Osraige, and the Osraige inflicted a slaughter on his followers, including Dogra son of Dúnadach, king of Síl Anmchada, Domnall son of Senchán, and a great number besides."

Dogra seems to have succeeded Gadhra Mór mac Dundach but was killed on the expedition to Osraige while acting as a vassal of King Donnchad mac Briain of Munster. The same account is given for the demise of his predecessor and brother, Gadhra Mór mac Dundach, the explanation may be that their deaths were confused.

| Preceded by Gadhra Mór mac Dundach | King of Síol Anmchadha; 1027–1027 | Succeeded by Dunadach mac Cú Connacht |
