= Barbara K. Sullivan =

American marine biologist

Barbara K. Sullivan is an American marine biologist. She is featured in an exhibit at the New England Aquarium for her work on comb jellies, also called ctenophores, and creatures such as chaetognatha and copepods. She is a professor at the University of Rhode Island.

Sullivan has published extensively.

== See also ==
- Laurence Madin
