= John Ó Madadhan =

John Ó Madadhan (died 1556) was Lord of Síol Anmchadha and Chief of the Name.

Preceded by Breasal Ó Madadhan	Lords of Síol Anmchadha; 1554-1556	Succeeded by Domhnall Ó Madadhan
