= Dunadach mac Cú Connacht =

Dunadach mac Cú Connacht (died 1032) was King of Síol Anmchadha.

== Biography ==
His obituary in the Irish annals state that he was slain. No details are given.

Preceded by Dogra mac Dúnadach	King of Síol Anmchadha; 1027–1032	Succeeded by Diarmaid mac Madudan
