= Dimity (given name) =

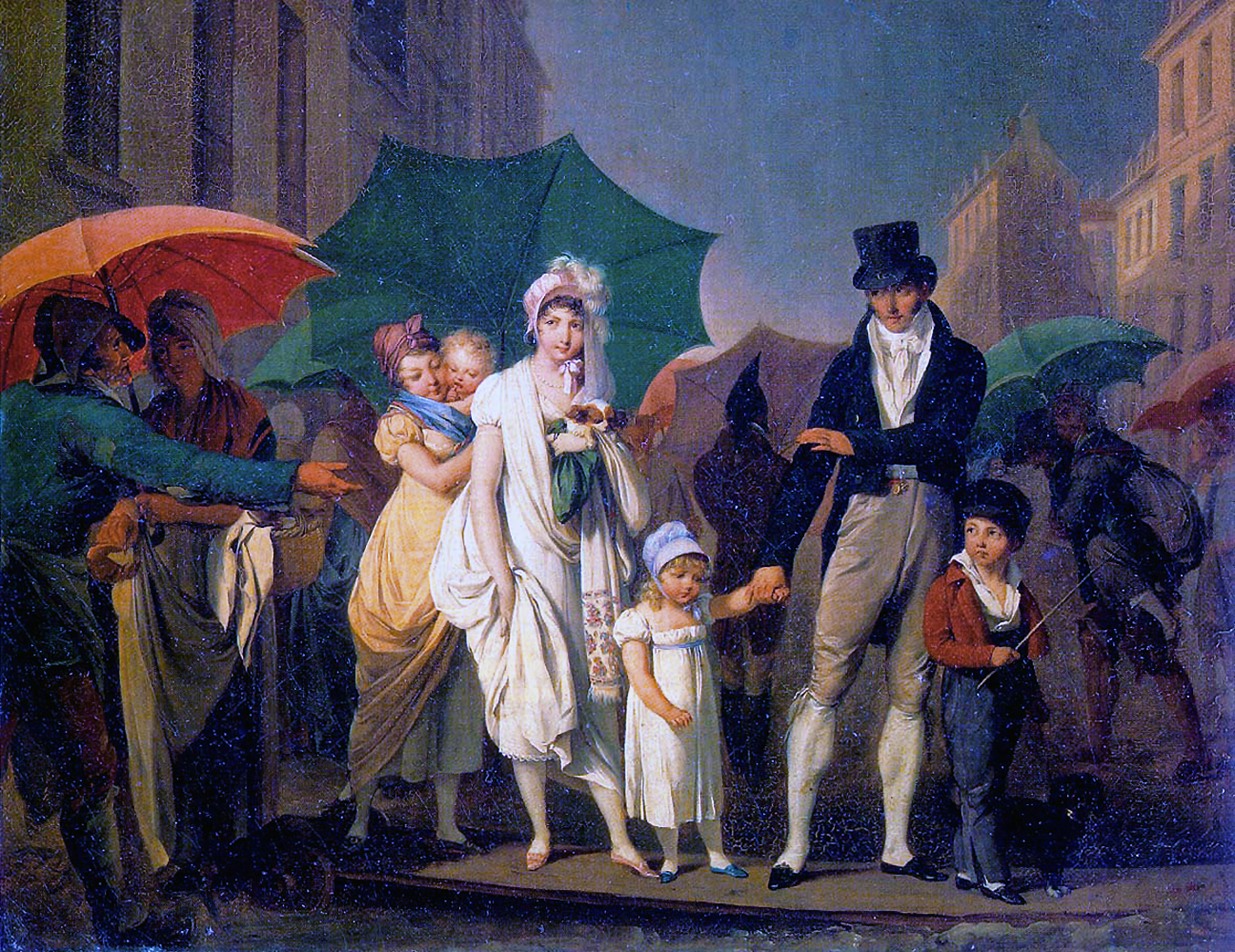
- Passer Payez by Louis-Léopold Boilly, 1803. The edge of the woman's dimity cloth chemise is visible beneath the hem of her skirt.
- Gender: Female
- Language: English

Origin
- Meaning: dimity or English feminine equivalent of Irish Diarmaid, meaning without envy.

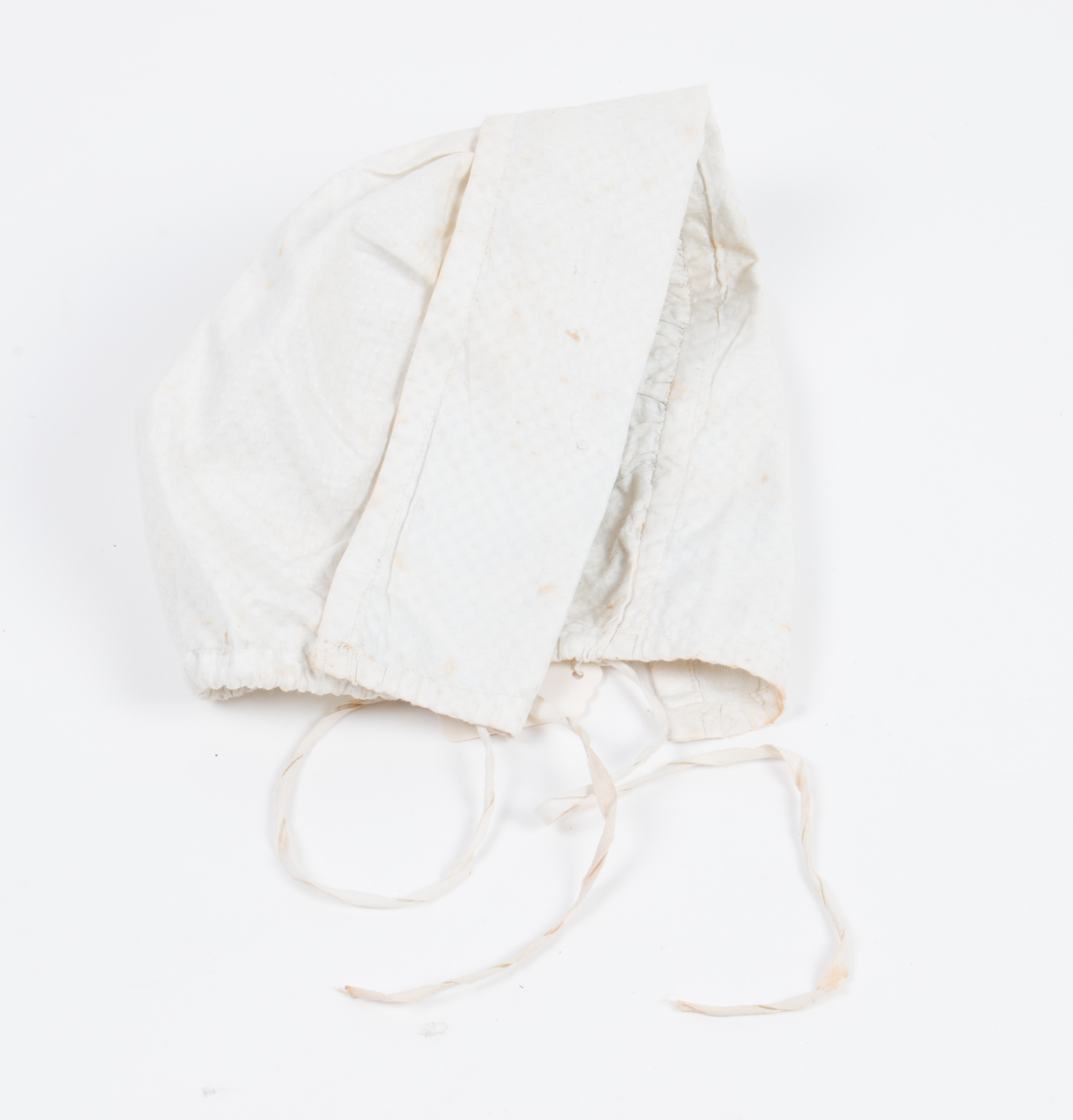
A child's bonnet made of white dimity fabric.

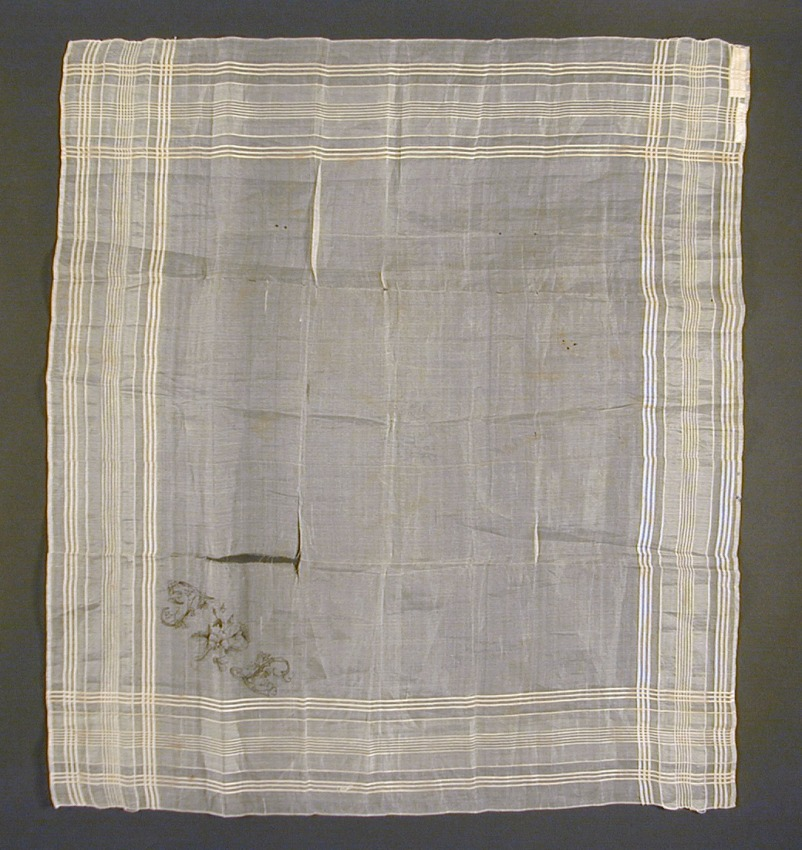
A silk dimity handkerchief from the mid-1800s.

Dimity is a rare English feminine given name likely derived from the name for the fabric, which comes from the Greek prefix di, meaning two, and the Greek word mitos, meaning thread.

The Greek term was later used in Latin and was transformed into the Italian word dimiti, which became the English word dimity.

It might also have been used in Ireland as an English feminine version of the Irish name Diarmaid, a name which is possibly derived in part from the Irish dí, which means without; and either from the Irish airmit, which means injunction, or airmait, which means envy.

== History of usage ==
The name has historically been in use primarily in Australia, where its greatest use was between the late 1940s and early 1960s, and in Ireland. The name might have been used in the mid-1800s in the Anglosphere because the fabric was favored for making bustles that were in vogue at the time. As a result, the name has an image of refined, upper class femininity and is also seen as quaint and whimsical in part because the fabric is often used for vintage fashions or to make heirloom clothing. For some, it also has an excessively prim image. The name also has a slightly saucy image for some because dimity fabric was also used to make the body stockings worn by Victorian era actresses in erotic tableau vivants. Come Under My Dimity is a traditional Irish slip jig. The name Dimity was used by Irish writer Arthur Murphy for a female character, the mother of the newly wed wife, in his farce comedy play Three Weeks After Marriage, which debuted in Theatre Royal, Covent Garden, London, on 30 March 1776.

The rare name attracted some comment in American media when Americans Chris Hardwick and Lydia Hearst used it for their daughter in 2022. Hearst explained that they chose the name because she believes the word describes fabric that is dainty but also tough because it is a double weave, which reminded them of their marriage. No more than four American girls in any given year since 1880, including in 2022, have ever been named Dimity in the United States. The United States Social Security Administration only includes names with five or more uses per year, per sex, in its name statistics. However, the name was in use in the Southern United States at least by the mid to late 1800s and has been in steady, occasional use for American women and girls since that time.

== Women ==
- Dimity Dornan, Australian speech pathologist, author, social entrepreneur, bionics advocate, researcher, and businesswoman
- Dimity Douglas (born 1970), Australian swimmer and 1984 Summer Olympian
- Dimity Reed (born 1942), Australian architect

== Fictional characters ==
- Dimity, a character in the 1776 play Three Weeks After Marriage by Irish writer Arthur Murphy
- Aunt Dimity, a main character in the series of Aunt Dimity mystery novels by American author Nancy Atherton
- Dimity Munroe, a minor character in Gone with the Wind by American author Margaret Mitchell
- Dimity Drill, a character in the 2017 television series The Worst Witch
- Dimity Duck, the titular character in the children's picture book Dimity Duck by American writer Jane Yolen
- Dimity Dumpty, the titular character of the children's picture book Dimity Dumpty: The Story of Humpty's Little Sister by Australian writer Bob Graham
- Dimity Henstock, a character in the Thrush Green novel series by English author Miss Read
- Dimity Plumleigh-Teignmott, a character in the Parasol Protectorates series of novels by American author Gail Carriger
- Dimity Rush, a character in the 2007 New Zealand comedy-drama television series Rude Awakenings
- Dimity Slattery, a character in the short story Miss Slattery and her Demon Lover that appears in The Burnt Ones, a collection of short stories published in 1964 by Australian writer Patrick White
