= Gadhra Mór mac Dundach =

Gadhra Mór mac Dundach (died 1027) was King of Síol Anmchadha and Uí Maine.

== Biography ==
Gadhra Mór was one of three known sons of Dundach, chief of the region extending from Grian to Caradh. The others were Diarmaid (died 998) and Cú Connacht mac Dundach (died 1006). He became chief of Síol Anmchadha in 1008, and all of Uí Maine after 1014. Tadhg Mór Ua Cellaigh had been the previous chief of Uí Maine but had been killed in the Battle of Clontarf, so in the following year Gadhra Mór took possession of the region extending from Grian to Caradh.

In 1023 he attacked and plundered the monastic city of Clonmacnoise. The Annals of the Four Masters state that he carried off several hundred cows. Four years later he was killed on a predatory excursion in Osraige while accompanying Donnchad mac Briain, King of Munster. His known issue were Madudan mac Gadhra Mór (died 1008) and Cú Connacht mac Gadhra Mór (died ca. 1045).

== Family tree ==
 Dundach s. Cobhthach s. Maelduin s. Donngal s. Anmchadh s. Eoghan Buac s. Cormac s. Cairpri s. Feradhach s. Lughaidh s. Dallán mac Breasal.
    |
    |_________________________________________________________________________
    |                      |                         |                       | 
    |                      |                         |                       |
    Diarmaid (d. 998)      Cú Connacht (d. 1006)     Gadhra Mór (d. 1027)    Dogra (d. 1027)
                           |                         |
                           |                         |____________________
                           Dundach (d. 1032)         |                  |
                                                     |                  |
                                                     Madudan (d. 1008)  Cú Connacht (c. ca. 1045) 
                                                     |
                                                     |
                                                     Diarmaid (d. 1069)                        ?
                                                     |                                         |
                                                     |                                         |
                                     Madudan Reamhar Ua Madadhan, died 1096.         Cú Coirne Ua Madudhan (d. 1158)
                                                     |
    _________________________________________________|__________
    |                       |           |                      |
    |                       |           |                      |
    Madudan Mór, fl. 1158.  Murchadh    Conchobhar      Maelsechlainn (fl. 1158-88)
                                        |
                                        |
                                     Murchad (d. 1201)

Preceded by Madudan mac Gadhra Mór	King of Síol Anmchadha; 1008–1027	Succeeded by Dogra mac Dúnadach
