= Diarmaid Ua Madadhan =

Diarmaid Ua Madadhan (died 1135) was King of Síol Anmchadha and Uí Maine.

== Background ==
Diarmaid was the son of Madudan Reamhar Ua Madadhan (died 1096). In addition to ruling Síol Anmchadha, he was the last of his dynasty to gain overlordship of Uí Maine, ca. 1134.

== Ua Fuirg and Ua Ceannéidigh ==
In 1131 he was responsible for the slaying of Domhnaill Ua Fuirg, lord of Uí Forgo. This led to his own death in 1135 by Gilla Caoimhin Ua Ceannéidigh, to whom Ua Fuirg was a dependent. He was succeeded by Cú Coirne Ua Madadhan, who ruled from 1135 to 1158.

== Family ==
The names of Diarmaid's spouses and partners do not seem to be recorded. He is listed as having the following male issue:

- Madudan Mór Ua Madadhan, who became chief in 1158
- Murchadh
- Conchobhar, whose son Murchad became chief of half of Síol Anmchadha, and died in 1201
- Maelsechlainn Ua Madadhan, chief from 1158 to 1188.

A poem described Diarmaid as without weakness or error.

Preceded by Gillafin Mac Coulahan	King of Síol Anmchadha; 1101–1135	Succeeded by Cú Coirne Ua Madudhan
Preceded by Aed Ua Cellaigh	King of Uí Maine; 1134–1135	Succeeded by Tadhg Ua Cellaigh
