= Dimity =

Type of sheer textile, usually made of cotton

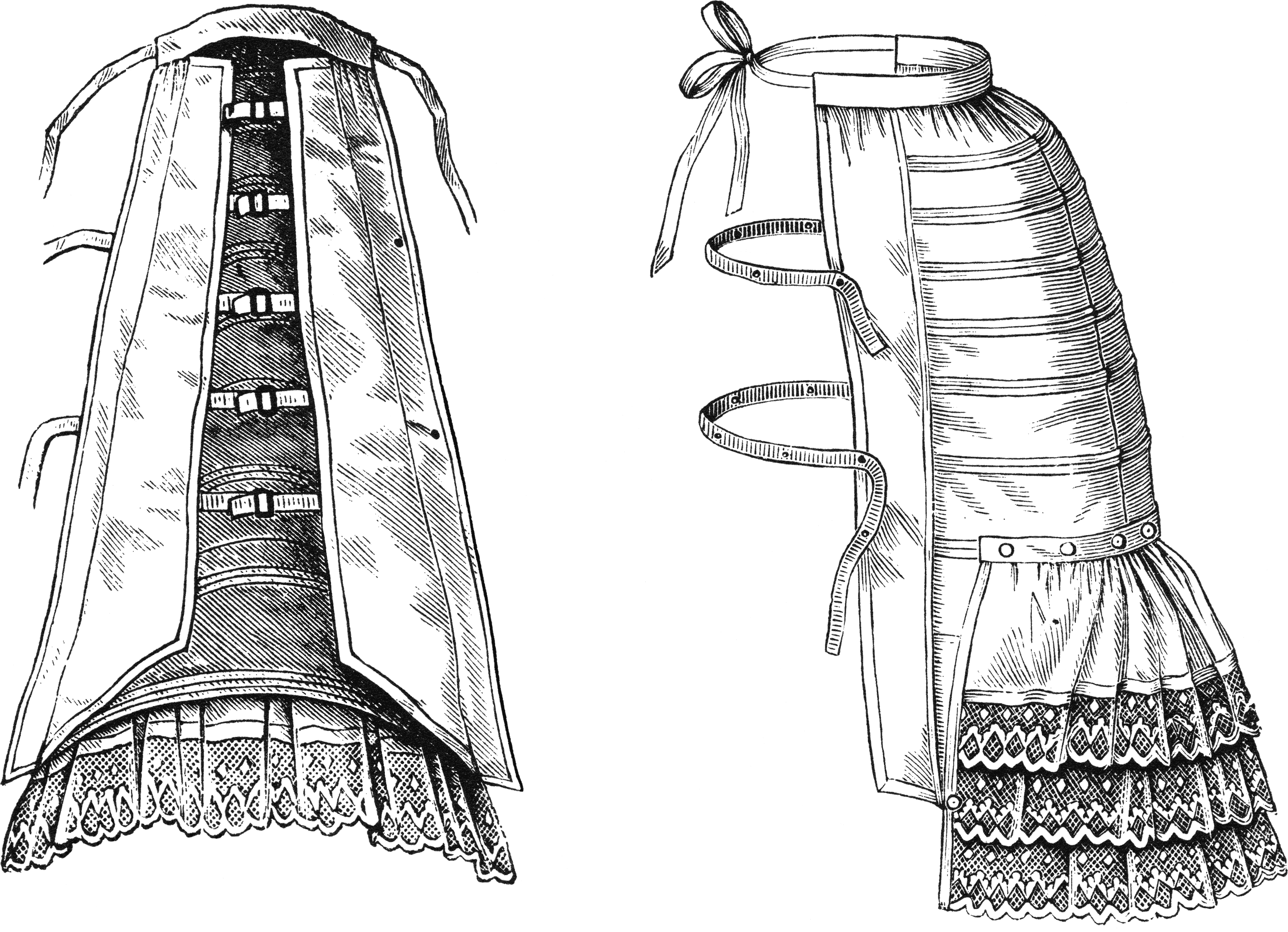
A bustle made from dimity, 1881.

Dimity is a collective term for figured cloths of harness loom decorated with designs and patterns. It is a strong cotton cloth with various stripes and illustrations. Dimity is bleached or washed after looming, less often dyed—unlike fustian, which is usually dyed.

It is a lightweight, sheer cotton fabric, having at least two warp threads thrown into relief to form fine cords. Chiefly, dimity is fashioned into white bed upholstery and curtains, though it is occasionally imprinted with a colorful pattern. Dimity was historically made of silk or wool; however, since the 18th century, dimity-weavers have almost exclusively used cotton.

== Types ==
Diaper is a type of dimity made of linen or cotton. It is a twill weave with diamond patterns.

A palampore is a dimity made in India and used for bed coverings.

== Name ==
Dimity is also a girls' name—which, while still uncommon, is most popular in Australia.

== Article of clothing ==
A dimity is a bit of draping worn by performers of the Poses Plastiques, which was an early form of strip tease. Performers wore flesh colored silk body stockings and a dimity to give the illusion of modesty.

== Theatrical references ==
- In the Finale of Act I of The Pirates of Penzance, the Pirates sing, "Pray observe the magnanimity we display to lace and dimity".
- In the conclusion of Paul Selver's translation of The Insect Play by brothers Karel and Josef Čapek, a group of school children sing: "As I went down to Shrewsbury Town, / I saw my love in a dimity gown: / And all so gay I gave it away, / I gave it away—my silver crown."
