= Cathal Ó Madadhan =

Cathal Ó Madadhan (died 1286) was King of Síol Anmchadha.

No details seem to be known of his era.

Preceded by Madudan Óg Ó Madadhan	King of Síol Anmchadha; 1235–1286	Succeeded by Murchadh Ó Madadhan
