= Owen Ó Madadhan =

Owen Ó Madadhan (fl. 1475) was Lord of Síol Anmchadha and Chief of the Name.

== External links and bibliography ==
- http://www.rootsweb.ancestry.com/~irlkik/ihm/uimaine.htm
- Annals of Ulster at CELT: Corpus of Electronic Texts at University College Cork
- Annals of Tigernach at CELT: Corpus of Electronic Texts at University College Cork
- Revised edition of McCarthy's synchronisms at Trinity College Dublin.
- Irish Kings and High-Kings, Francis John Byrne, Dublin (1971;2003) Four Courts Press, ISBN 978-1-85182-196-9
- History of the O'Maddens of Hy-Many, Gerard Madden, 2004. ISBN 0-9529511-7-7.
- The Life, Legends and Legacy of Saint Kerrill: A Fifth-Century East Galway Evangelist by Joseph Mannion, 2004. ISBN 0-9547698-1-3
- http://www.ucc.ie/celt/published/G105007/index.html

Preceded by Murchadh Reagh Ó Madadhan	Lords of Síol Anmchadha; 1475-c. 1479	Succeeded by Breasal Ó Madadhan
