= Madudan Óg Ó Madadhan =

Madudan Óg Ó Madadhan (died 1235) was King of Síol Anmchadha.

No details seem to be known of his era.

Preceded by Diarmaid Cleirech Ua Madadhan	King of Síol Anmchadha; 1207–1235	Succeeded by Cathal Ó Madadhan
