= Madudan mac Gadhra Mór =

Madudan mac Gadhra Mór (died 1008) was the namesake and ancestor of the Ó Madden family.

Madudan was the son of Gadhra Mór mac Dundach who fought at the Battle of Clontarf in 1014. The Annals of Ulster describe him as Chief of Síol Anmchadha on the occasion of his death - killed by his brother, Cú Connacht mac Gadhra Mór (died ca. 1045) - in 1008. Gerard Madden expresses some doubt about his description as chief, as his father became lord in the same year, and also about his parentage. Madudan's only known issue was Diarmaid mac Madudan (chief 1032–1069) whose son, Madudan Reamhar Ua Madadhan (chief 1069–1096) was the first of the Síol Anmchadha to bear the surname Ó Madadhan.

In his edition of the Tribes and Customs of Hy-Many, John O'Donovan quotes a prose tract written during the lifetime of Eoghan Ó Madadhan (died 1347) which calls Diarmaid son of the affluent Madudan, son of the fettering Gadhra.

Preceded by Cú Connacht mac Dundach	King of Síol Anmchadha; 1006–1008	Succeeded by Gadhra Mór mac Dundach
