= Cass Midhe =

Irish lawyer

Cass Midhe ("Cass of Meath"), Irish lawyer, died 1017.

Cass Midhe or Cassmidhe is recorded as the lawgiver of Máel Sechnaill II, High King of Ireland (died 1022). What little is known of him is given in an account of his death, preserved in the Annals of the Four Masters:

1017. A predatory excursion by Maelseachlainn into the territory of the Feara-Ceall; and a party of the army was overtaken by the Feara-Ceall and the Eli so that Domhnall Ua Caindealbhain, lord of Cinel-Laeghaire, and Cass-Midhe, Maelseachlainn's lawgiver, were slain; and Ua Cleircein, lord of Caille-Follambain, was wounded, and died after a short period. Flannagan Ua Ceallaigh, and Conghalach, son of Maelseachlainn, were mortally wounded at the same place.

The king retreated back to his home kingdom of Mide, where he died in 1022.
