= Murchadh Ó Madadhain =

Murchadh Ó Madadhain (fl. 1347–1371) was chief of Síol Anmchadha.

Preceded by Eoghan Ó Madadhan	Lords of Síol Anmchadha; 1347–1371	Succeeded by Eoghan Mór Ó Madadhan
