= Dermod Dwyer =

Irish businessman

- Occupation: Executive Chairman of the Convention Centre Dubli

Dermod Dwyer is Executive Chairman of the Convention Centre Dublin, the Ritz- Carlton Powerscourt and Setanta Sports Broadcasting Ireland.

Dermod Dwyer is an Irish businessman, civic leader, and cultural patron. He is best known as the founding Executive Chairman of The Convention Centre Dublin (1997–2021), a landmark public-private partnership in Ireland's conference and tourism infrastructure. He has held prominent leadership roles in hospitality, broadcasting, education, and the arts. Dwyer currently serves as Chairman of Powerscourt Estate and is a board member of the Irish Museum of Modern Art.

== Career ==
Dwyer began his career in the hotel and hospitality sector in Limerick in 1968. He was elected President of the Irish Hotels Federation in 1981, and later chaired the Federation's National Tourism Policy Committee in 1986.

In 1989, he completed a master's in public administration at Harvard Kennedy School. He subsequently worked as a senior research analyst at the Taubman Center for State and Local Government and served on the Harvard Alumni Executive Council from 1994 to 1998.

In 1992, he co-founded Tourism and Transport Consult International (TTC), a consultancy firm working with governments and the private sector on tourism, events, and infrastructure policy. He played a central role in the planning and development of The Convention Centre Dublin, which opened in 2010 and became Ireland's first purpose-built international conference venue. He served as Executive Chairman until his retirement in 2021.

He is also the co-author of Desert Bonds (2025), an Irish Times bestseller chronicling a 3,500 km father–son journey through Lebanon, Syria, Jordan, Israel, and Palestine to Gaza's Erez Crossing.

== Other Positions ==
- Chairman, Powerscourt Estate & Gardens (2019–present)
- Director, Irish Museum of Modern Art (2015–present)
- Founder & Patron, The Caroline Foundation (2013–present)
- Chairman, Setanta Sports Broadcasting Ireland (2000–2011)
- Founder Chairman, The Ritz-Carlton, Powerscourt (2000–2013)
- Non-executive Chairman, Educena Foundation (2007–2017), trustees of 112 secondary schools in Ireland
- Independent Chairman, Bray Rejuvenation Committee (2006–2008), which received the Chambers Ireland Public–Private Partnership Award and was named Ireland's cleanest town
- Governing Body member and Chair of Development Committee, Marino Institute of Education (2002–2013)
- Governor and Guardian, National Gallery of Ireland (2010–2015)
- Non-executive Director, MTCI (2010–2016), now the National Cancer Research Centre of Ireland
- Chair, Wicklow for Europe (Lisbon II Referendum, 2009)
- Council Member, Greystones Town Team (2017–present)
- Founder, Greystones 2020 civic initiative (2020–2023)

== Education ==
- Clongowes Wood College and Crescent College, Limerick
- National Institute for Higher Education (NIHE), Limerick
- MPA, Harvard Kennedy School, 1989
- Diploma in Corporate Governance, University College Dublin, 2004
- Founder Member, Corporate Governance Association of Ireland, 2005
- Chartered Director, Institute of Directors, London, 2008

== Awards ==
- Lifetime Achievement Award, Association of Irish Professional Conference Organizers (AIPCO), 2019

== Publications ==
- Desert Bonds (2025) – Irish Times Bestseller, co-authored memoir of a 3,500 km journey through the Middle East.

== Other positions ==
- Non-executive chairman of Setanta Sports Broadcasting Ireland since 2002 (reappointed by new shareholders in September 2009 following successful transfer of business to new ownership);
- Non-executive chairman of the Educena Foundation from 2007, Trustees of 112 secondary schools in Ireland;
- Independent Chairman of Bray Rejuvenation Committee 2006 to 2008, a Public-private partnership category winner of Chambers of Commerce of Ireland National Award and subsequently Ireland's cleanest town
- Non-executive Governing Body member and Chairman of Development Committee of Marino Institute of Education from 2002 to 2009;
- Chairman of Wicklow for Europe – Lisbon 2 Treaty referendum
- Appointed to the Board, as Governor and Guardian, of the National Gallery of Ireland by Minister for Arts, Sport & Tourism in June 2010
- Appointed as non-executive director to the Board of MTCI (the science Foundation Molecular Therapeutics for Cancer Ireland) .

== Education ==
- Clongowes Wood College & the Crescent College Limerick;
- NIHE, Limerick;
- 1988: Harvard University;
- 2004: University College Dublin – Diploma in Corporate Governance;
- 2005: Founder Member of Corporate Governance Association of Ireland;
- 2008: Institute of Directors London – Chartered Director .
