= Cú Connacht mac Dundach =

Ancient Irish King

Known by his moniker, Cú Connacht mac Dundach ("The Hound of Connacht, Son of Dundach") (died 1006) was King of Síol Anmchadha, Ireland.

He is described as King in the Annals of Innisfallen. He was killed in battle near Lorrha by the Muskerry of County Cork, though other annals state he was killed by either Brian Boru or his son, Murchad. His son, Dundach mac Cú Connacht was lord of Síol Anmchadha from 1027 to 1032. He was an uncle of Madudan mac Gadhra Mór, ancestor of the Ó Madden family.

Regnal titles
Unknown	King of Síol Anmchadha ?-1006	Succeeded by Madudan mac Gadhra Mór
