= Diarmaid Ó Cúlacháin =

Diarmaid Ó Cúlacháin, Irish historian and scribe, died 1221.

Ó Cúlacháin was a native of what is now County Mayo. His precise location within the county is uncertain, though he is associated with two successive coarbs or erenaghs of Aughagower, and Knock, County Mayo.

The Annals of Lough Ce give him the following obituary:

Diarmaid O'Culechain, a professor of history and writing, died in this year, i.e. a man who had more writings and knowledge than any one that came in his own time; and it was he that wrote the Mass book of Cnoc, and another Mass book the equal of it for Diarmaid Mac Oirechtaigh, his tutor, and for Gillapatraic, his foster-brother — the comarbs of Achadh-Fabhair in succession.

The surname Ó Cúlacháin is now mainly rendered as Coolahan or Coolaghan. It is distinct from Mac Uallacháin, an unrelated Galway family (now Colahan or Holland).
