= Eoghan Mór Ó Madadhan =

Eoghan Mór Ó Madadhan, Chief of Síol Anmchadha, fl. 1371–1410.

Preceded by Murchadh Ó Madadhain	Lords of Síol Anmchadha; 1371-1410	Succeeded by Murcadh Ó Madadhan
