= Maddin =

Maddin is a surname. Notable people with the surname include:

- Edward Maddin (1852-1925), Canadian-American Navy sailor
- Guy Maddin (born 1956), Canadian screenwriter
- James William Maddin (1874-1961), Canadian lawyer and politician
- Jim Maddin (born 1947/1948), Canadian politician
- Thomas L. Maddin (1826-1908), American physician

== See also ==
- Madden (surname)
- Madin (surname)
