= Dermot Earley =

Dermot Earley may refer to:

- Dermot Earley Snr (1948–2010), Roscommon Gaelic footballer and chief of staff of the Irish Defence Forces
- Dermot Earley Jnr (born 1978), his son, Kildare Gaelic footballer
