= Madudan Mór Ua Madadhan =

Madudan Mór Ua Madadhan (died after 1158) was King of Síol Anmchadha.

No details of his era appear to be known.

Preceded by Cú Coirne Ua Madudhan	King of Síol Anmchadha; 1158-?	Succeeded by Melaghlin Ua Madadhan
