= Cú Coirne Ua Madudhan =

King of Síol Anmchadha

Cú Coirne Ua Madudhan (died 1158) was King of Síol Anmchadha.

No details seem to be known of his era.

Preceded by Diarmaid Ua Madadhan	King of Síol Anmchadha; 1135–1158	Succeeded by Madudan Mór Ua Madadhan
