= Diarmuid O'Connor =

Diarmuid O'Connor may refer to:

- Diarmuid O'Connor (Mayo Gaelic footballer) (born 1995), wing forward
- Diarmuid O'Connor (Kerry Gaelic footballer) (born 1999), midfield
