= Madudan Reamhar Ua Madadhan =

Irish king (r. 1069–1096)

Madudan Reamhar Ua Madadhan was Chief of Síol Anmchadha from 1069 to 1096

== Biography ==
A great grandson of Gadhra Mór mac Dundach, grandson of Madudan mac Gadhra Mór, and son of Diarmaid mac Madudan, Madudan Reamhar was the first bearer of the surname Madden, a family originally from east County Galway.

He died of a pestilence which caused a great mortality of the men of Ireland in 1095. Following his death, Gillafin Mac Coulahan became ruler but was killed in 1101 by Madudan's son, Diarmaid Ua Madadhan.

His nickname reamhar meant large or fat.

Preceded by Diarmaid mac Madudan	King of Síol Anmchadha; 1069–1096	Succeeded by Gillafin Mac Coulahan
