= Murrough =

Murrough may refer to:

- Murrough Boyle, 1st Viscount Blesington (1645–1718), Irish peer and member of the House of Lords
- Murrough mac Toirdelbach Ó Briain, Chief of the Name, the Clan Tiege of Aran, fl. 1575 – 1588
- Domhnall Spainneach Mac Murrough Caomhanach (died 1632), the last King of Leinster
- Murrough Ua Cellaigh, 41st King of Uí Maine and 8th Chief of the Name, died 1186
- Murrough na dTuadh Ó Flaithbheartaigh, Chief of Iar Connacht, died 1593
- Murrough McDermot O'Brien, 3rd Baron Inchiquin (1550–1573), the 3rd Baron Inchiquin
- Murrough O'Brien, 1st Earl of Inchiquin and 6th Baron Inchiquin (1614–1674), known as Murchadh na dTóiteán ("of the conflagrations")
- Murrough O'Brien, 4th Baron Inchiquin (1562–1597), the 4th Baron Inchiquin
- Murrough Ó Laoí (1668–1684), Irish physician
- Dermot Mac Murrough (1110–1171), King of Leinster in Ireland
- Teige Mac Murrough O'Brien (–1577), a son of Murrough O'Brien, 1st Earl of Thomond and Eleanor fitz John
- Murrough O'Brien, 1st Earl of Thomond (died 1551), the last King of Thomond, and a descendant of the High King of Ireland, Brian Boru
- Murrough O'Brien, 1st Marquess of Thomond KP, PC (Ire) (1726–1808), 5th Earl of Inchiquin, an Irish peer, soldier and politician
- John Patrick Murrough (1822–1901), British politician
- Murrough John Wilson KBE (1875–1946), British Army officer, member of parliament, and railway executive

== See also ==
- MacMurrough
- Murro
- Murru
