= Murcadh Ó Madadhan =

Murcadh Ó Madadhan (died 1451) was Chief of Síol Anmchadha.

Preceded by Eoghan Mór Ó Madadhan	Lords of Síol Anmchadha; 1410-1451	Succeeded by Eoghan Carrach Ó Madadhan
