= Cathal Ó Matadain =

Irish philosopher

Cathal Ó Matadain, Irish philosopher, died 1343.

Ó Matadain is described in the Annals of Lough Ce as a sage of Ireland. In 1343, in unknown circumstances, he was killed by the Clann Ricairt, or the Burke family of Clanricarde in what is now County Galway.
