= Eoghan Carrach Ó Madadhan =

Eoghan Carrach Ó Madadhan (fl. 1451) was Chief of Síol Anmchadha.

Preceded by Murcadh Ó Madadhan	Lords of Síol Anmchadha; 1451-?	Succeeded by Murchadh Reagh Ó Madadhan
