= Diarmaid mac Madudan =

Diarmaid mac Madudan was Chief of Síol Anmchadha from 1032 to 1069.

== Biography ==
Described as a rod who ruled each road, Diarmaid was the son of Madudan mac Gadhra Mór. He led the Madden clan in a plundering raid on Clonmacnoise in 1050. However, he became blind in old age and was killed by his nephew, Madudan, and succeeded by his son, Madudan Reamhar Ua Madadhan.

Preceded by Dunadach mac Cú Connacht	King of Síol Anmchadha; 1032-1069	Succeeded by Madudan Reamhar Ua Madadhan
