= Jon Madin =

Musician and teacher

Jon Madin (born 1949) is a current music teacher. He has had experience in folk, orchestral, and multi-cultural bands. He has released 6 books, with two detailing marimba usage and one book that explains how to make experimental instruments. He currently resides in Drummond, Victoria, Australia, but travels regularly interstate and internationally giving workshops for schools and community groups.

== Books written ==
- Make Your Own Wacky Instruments: Illustrated Instructions for Making Musical Instruments (1996)
- Marimba Music 1 (2002)
- Marimba Music 2 (1997)
- Make Your Own Marimbas: Illustrated Instructions for Making Your Own Marimbas (2005)
- Marimba Music for Little Kids: : Songs and Easy Pieces with Music for Kids (1998)
- Marimba Songs: Songs for kids with easy marimba and xylophone arrangements (2006)
