= Laurence Madin =

American biologist

Laurence Madin is an American Marine biologist. He is featured in an exhibit at the New England Aquarium for his work on salps, which are chordate jellyfish. He is currently executive vice president and director of research of Woods Hole Oceanographic Institution (WHOI).

Madin grew up in northern California, and received a bachelor's degree from the University of California, Berkeley, and a Ph.D. from University of California, Davis. He started research on plankton in the 1970s. He was chair of WHOI's Biology Department, and director of its Ocean Life Institute, before becoming its acting director, and later director, of research.

Madin is the author of many scholarly articles about salps and other sea creatures, especially their impact on the environment.

He was also chief scientist for a National OAA expedition to the Celebes Sea.
