= Breasal Ó Madadhan =

Breasal Ó Madadhan, Lord of Síol Anmchadha and Chief of the Name, died 1526.

The Annals of the Four Masters, sub anno 1479, state that The monastery of Meelick was founded by O'Madden, on the bank of the Shannon, in the diocese of Clonfert, for Franciscan Friars; and he chose a burial-place for himself in it. It is uncertain if this refers to Breasal, or his predecessor, Eoghan.

In 1490, the Annals of the Four Masters state that "Thomas O'Lorcan, intended Ollav to O'Madden ... died."

His obituary describes him as "a kind, brave, mild, and justly-judging man."

Preceded by Eoghan Ó Madadhan	Lord of Síol Anmchadha; 1479?-1526	Succeeded by Domhnall Ó Madadhan
