= Melaghlin Ua Madadhan =

Melaghlin Ua Madadhan (died 1188) was King of Síol Anmchadha.

No details seem to be known of his era.

| Preceded by Cú Coirne Ua Madudhan | King of Síol Anmchadha ?-1188 | Succeeded by Diarmaid Cleirech Ua Madadhan |
