= Murchadh Reagh Ó Madadhan =

Murchadh Reagh Ó Madadhan (died 1475) was Chief of Síol Anmchadha.

Preceded by Eoghan Carrach Ó Madadhan	Lords of Síol Anmchadha ?-1475	Succeeded by Owen Ó Madadhan
