= Diarmaid Cleirech Ua Madadhan =

Diarmaid Cleirech Ua Madadhan (died 1207) was King of Síol Anmchadha.

No details seem to be known of his era.

Preceded by Melaghlin Ua Madadhan	King of Síol Anmchadha; 1188–1207	Succeeded by Madudan Óg Ó Madadhan
