= Anmchadh Ó Madadhan =

Anmchadh Ó Madadhan, Chief of the Name, died 1636.

Preceded by Domhnall Ó Madadhan	Chief of the Name; 1612-1636	Succeeded by John Ó Madden
