= Murchadh Ó Madadhan =

Murchadh Ó Madadhan (died 1327) was King of Síol Anmchadha.

Murchad of Magh Bealaigh, who was Chief from 1286 to 1327. Murchad married Marcella, daughter of Eoghan Ó Cellaigh. In 1327 He resigned his chieftainship of his own accord and went away from Royal Rule to Rome, to resign his soul to the Supreme King, and his body to the cemetery of Saint Peter in the chief city.

Preceded by Cathal Ó Madadhan	Lords of Síol Anmchadha; 1286-1327	Succeeded by Eoghan Ó Madadhan
