= Eoghan Ó Madadhan =

Irish chief (fl. 1314–1347)

Eoghan Ó Madadhan (fl. 1314-1347) was Chief of Síol Anmchadha.

== Early life ==
Eoghan was one of the four sons of Murchad of Magh Bealaigh, who was Chief from 1286 to 1327. Murchad married Marcella, daughter of Eoghan Ó Cellaigh. In 1327 He resigned his chieftainship of his own accord and went away from Royal Rule to Rome, to resign his soul to the Supreme King, and his body to the cemetery of Saint Peter in the chief city.

== The Connacht Bruce Wars ==
In 1314 he led the Maddens in concert with the Ui Maine under Tadhg Ó Cellaigh who were allied with Murtough O Brien in the civil war then devastating County Clare. At the stronghold of the Ó Gradys, they did grievous killing ... women and boys and whole families included, whereby that murderous far secluded area became a mere heap of carnage thickly stacked. His brother Amhlaibh participated in warfare in Clare the previous year. Eoghan may have been present at the Second Battle of Athenry in 1316, where his brother John is recorded as among the dead.

== Lord of Síol Anmchadha ==
In 1336 he engaged and defeated the Burkes of Clanricarde, killing three score and six ... both good and bad.

He is credited with having repaired the churches and he taught truth to its chieftains and dissensions and taught charity and humanity in his goodly districts. He built a 'distinguished residence' at Magh Bealaigh. Eoghan was the recipient of a poem by Seán Mór Ó Dubhagáin (died 1372) which gave his pedigree and flattered Eoghan, stating that There is not a wood nor bog not plain/not a river nor bright-pooled lake/not a harbour from Caradh to Grian/which is not due to thee o tranquil faced youth.

== Wife and family ==
He was married to a daughter of Edmund Burke. Their known children were:

- Cathal Ó Matadain, a sage of Ireland, was in 1343 killed by the Burkes of Clanricarde. Cathal's daughter, Finnghualain, died of the plague in 1398.
- Donnchad
- Nicholas
- Gadhra
- Murchadh Ó Madadhain, chief from 1347 to 1371.

Preceded by Murchadh Ó Madadhan	Lords of Síol Anmchadha; 1327-1347	Succeeded by Murchadh Ó Madadhain
