= Síol Anmchadha =

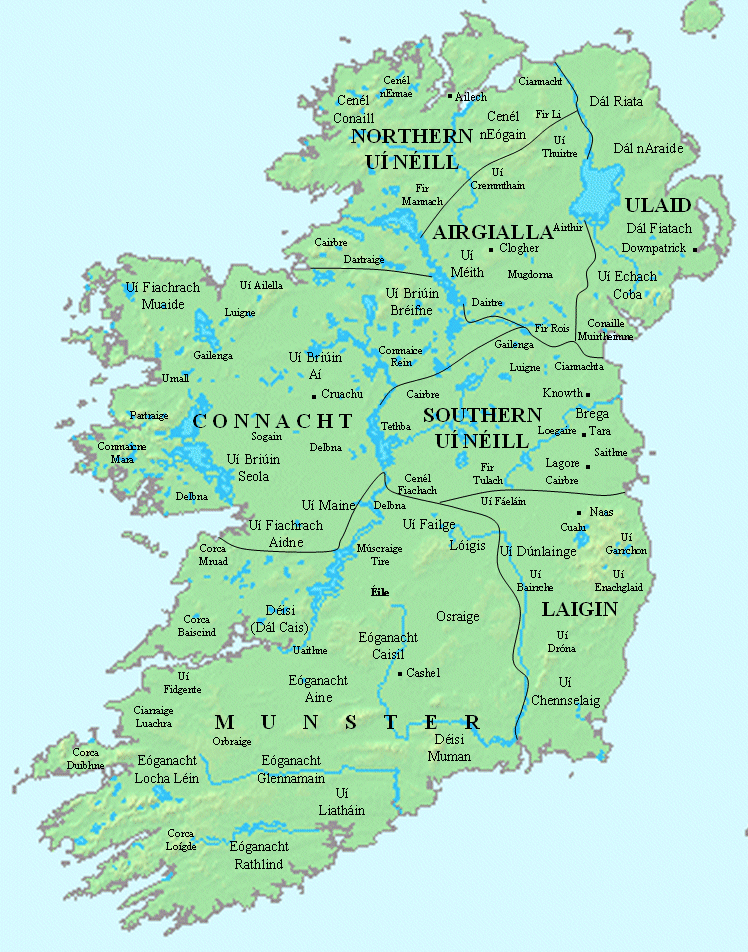
Early peoples and kingdoms of Ireland, ca. 800

Síol Anmchadha (Irish: Síl n-Anmcadha) was a sub-kingdom or lordship of Uí Maine, and ruled by an offshoot of the Uí Maine called the Síol Anmchadha ("the seed of Anmchadh"), from whom the territory took its name. It was located in Connacht, Ireland.

== History ==
At its largest extent, the Kings of Síol Anmchadha ruled all the land on the west shore of Lough Derg (Shannon) as far south as Thomond; the land between the Shannon and Suck rivers; and a corridor of land, known as Lusmagh, across the Shannon in Munster, in the direction of Birr. It was centred around the barony of Longford.

The ruling dynasty later took the surname Ó Madadháin, anglicised as Maddan or Madden. In the later medieval era, they were sometimes vassals of the Earls of Ulster and their successors, the Clanricardes.

== Legacy ==
In 1651, after the area had been incorporated into the Kingdom of Ireland, land belonging to the Madden, Kelly, Burke and other families was appropriated during the Cromwellian conquest of Ireland. In particular, the English brothers John Eyre and Edward Eyre took much land. "Eyrecourt" in the area is named after them (it was originally called Dún an Uchta) and their descendant became Baron Eyre.

The name Síol Anmchadha survives to the present day in the placename Baile Mór Síol Anmchadha, the Irish language version of Lawrencetown, County Galway.

== Local placenames ==
- Tynagh
- Portumna
- Eyrecourt
- Woodford, County Galway

== See also ==
- Clann Fhergail
- Uí Fiachrach Aidhne
- Clann Taidg
- Conmhaicne Mara
- Muintir Murchada
- Trícha Máenmaige
- Uí Díarmata
