= Larkin (name) =

Larkin is a given name and surname of Russian, English and Irish origin (Russian: Ларкин, Ларькин, Ларкина, Ларькина). In England, the name is a relationship name from Lar, a pet form of the personal name Laurence. In Ireland, the name means a descendant of Lorcain or Lorcan, originally found in the form O'Lorcain. The Russian version originates from the given name Hilarion.

Notable people and characters with the name include:

== Surname ==
- Anatoly Larkin (1932–2005), Russian physicist and professor at the University of Minnesota
- Austin Larkin (born 1995), American football player
- Barry Larkin (born 1964), American baseball player
- Bruce Larkin, American children's book author and poet
- Byron Larkin (born 1965), American basketball player and sportscaster; brother of Barry and Stephen Larkin
- Celia Larkin, Irish civil servant and politician
- Chris Larkin, British actor
- Christopher Larkin (disambiguation), several people
- Clarence Larkin (1850–1924), American author
- Claude A. Larkin (1891–1969), American Marine general
- Colin Larkin, British writer
- Denis Larkin (1908–1987), Irish politician
- Diarmuid Larkin (1918–1989), Irish artist and art educationist
- Dylan Larkin (born 1996), American ice hockey player
- Edward Larkin (disambiguation), several people
- Frank Larkin, Irish disability rights activist
- Gene Larkin, American baseball player
- Geri Larkin, American Zen teacher
- Henry Larkin (1860–1942), American baseball player
- Herbert Joseph Larkin (1894–1972), Australian flying ace
- James Larkin (disambiguation), several people
- Jill H. Larkin (born 1943), American cognitive scientist
- Joan Larkin, American poet and playwright
- Joan Marie Larkin, better known as Joan Jett (born 1958), American musician
- John Larkin (disambiguation), several people
- Linda Larkin, American actress
- Lorenz Larkin, American professional mixed martial artist
- Maeve Larkin, English actor and playwright
- Margaret Larkin, American writer and musician
- Matthew Larkin, Australian rules footballer who played for the North Melbourne Football Club
- Moscelyne Larkin, American ballerina, one of the "Five Moons"
- Olga I. Larkina, Russian journalist, publicist and writer
- Oliver Waterman Larkin (1896–1970), American art historian
- Patrick Larkin (hurler) (1866–1917), Irish hurler
- Patrick Larkin (novelist), American novelist
- Patrick Joseph Larkin (1829–1900), Canadian ship's captain, businessman and politician
- Patty Larkin, American folk musician
- Peter Charles Larkin, Canadian businessman
- Phil Larkin, Irish hurling player
- Philip Arthur Larkin (1922–1985), English poet
- Ryan Larkin, Canadian animator
- Seán Larkin (born 1949), Irish art curator and art educationist
- Shane Larkin (born 1992), American basketball player; son of Barry Larkin
- Shannon Larkin (born 1967), American musician, best known as a drummer
- Sophie Larkin (1833–1903), English actress
- Stephen Larkin (born 1973), American baseball player; brother of Barry and Byron Larkin
- Steve Larkin (1910–1969), American baseball player
- Thomas Larkin (disambiguation), several people
- Tim Larkin (composer), American video game composer and sound designer
- Tim Larkin (self-defense), American self-defense expert
- Timothy F. Larkin (died 1960), American football player and coach
- Tony Larkin, English professional footballer
- William Larkin (disambiguation)

== Given name ==
- Larkin B. Coles (1803–1856), American physician, minister, millerite preacher, anti-tobacco activist and vegetarian
- Larkin Allen Collins Jr. (1952 – 1990), known as Allen Collins, American guitarist
- Larkin Craig, American politician
- Larkin Grimm (born 1981), American singer-songwriter and musician
- Larkin Higgins, American poet
- Larkin Kerwin (1924–2004), Canadian physicist
- Larkin Malloy (1954–2016), American actor and acting teacher
- Larkin Goldsmith Mead (1835–1910), American sculptor
- Larkin Seiple (born 1985), American cinematographer
- Larkin Smith (disambiguation)
- Larkin Walsh, American lawyer and judge

== Fictional characters ==
- Andy Larkin, the main character of What's with Andy?
- Link Larkin, a lead character in the musical Hairspray
- Pop Larkin, Ma Larkin, and the Larkin family — characters in H. E. Bates' novel The Darling Buds of May and its sequels and television adaptation
- Theresa Russo (née Larkin), from Wizards of Waverly Place, and her parental family
- Maryellen Larkin, from the American Girl series of toys and books
- Bryce Larkin, in the TV show Chuck
- Vince Larkin, a US Marshal played by John Cusack in the Movie Con Air
- Rose Larkin, a main character in the TV show The Night Agent
- Sylvia Larkin, love interest in Sally Rooney's Intermezzo.

== See also ==
- Larkins (disambiguation)
