= Larken =

Larken is a surname. Notable people with the surname include:

- Anthea Larken (born 1938), British director of the Women's Royal Naval Service
- Edmund Larken (1809–1895), British cleric and Christian socialist
- Frank Larken (1875–1953), British Royal Navy officer
- Hubert Larken (1874–1964), British Anglican priest
- Sheila Larken (born 1944), American actress

== See also ==
- Larkin (disambiguation)
