= Patrick Larkin =

Patrick Larkin may refer to:

- Patrick Larkin (novelist) (fl. 1980s–1990s), American novelist
- Patrick Larkin (hurler) (1866–1917), Irish hurler
- Patrick Larkin (politician) (1829–1900), ship's captain, businessman and politician

== See also ==
- Patrick Larkins (1860–1918), Major League Baseball third baseman
