= List of monastic houses in County Galway =

The smaller establishments such as monastic cells and notable monastic granges (particularly those with resident monks) and camerae of the military orders of monks (Knights Templars and Knights Hospitallers) are included. The numerous monastic hospitals per se are not included here unless at some time the foundation had, or was purported to have, the status or function of an abbey, priory, or preceptory/commandery.

== Layout ==
Communities/provenance: shows the status and communities existing at each establishment, together with such dates as have been established as well as the fate of the establishment after dissolution, and the current status of the site.

Formal name or dedication: shows the formal name of the establishment or the person in whose name the church is dedicated, where known.

Alternative names: some of the establishments have had alternative names over the course of time. In order to assist in text-searching such alternatives in name or spelling have been provided.

== Abbreviations and key ==
The sites listed are ruins or fragmentary remains unless indicated thus:
*	current monastic function
+	current non-monastic ecclesiastic function
^	current non-ecclesiastic function
=	remains incorporated into later structure
#	no identifiable trace of the monastic foundation remains
~	exact site of monastic foundation unknown
ø	possibly no such monastic foundation at location
¤	no such monastic foundation
≈	identification ambiguous or confused

Locations with names in italics indicate probable duplication (misidentification with another location) or non-existent foundations (either erroneous reference or proposed foundation never implemented).

Trusteeship denoted as follows:
NIEA	Scheduled Monument (NI)
NM	National Monument (ROI)
C.I.	Church of Ireland
R.C.	Roman Catholic Church

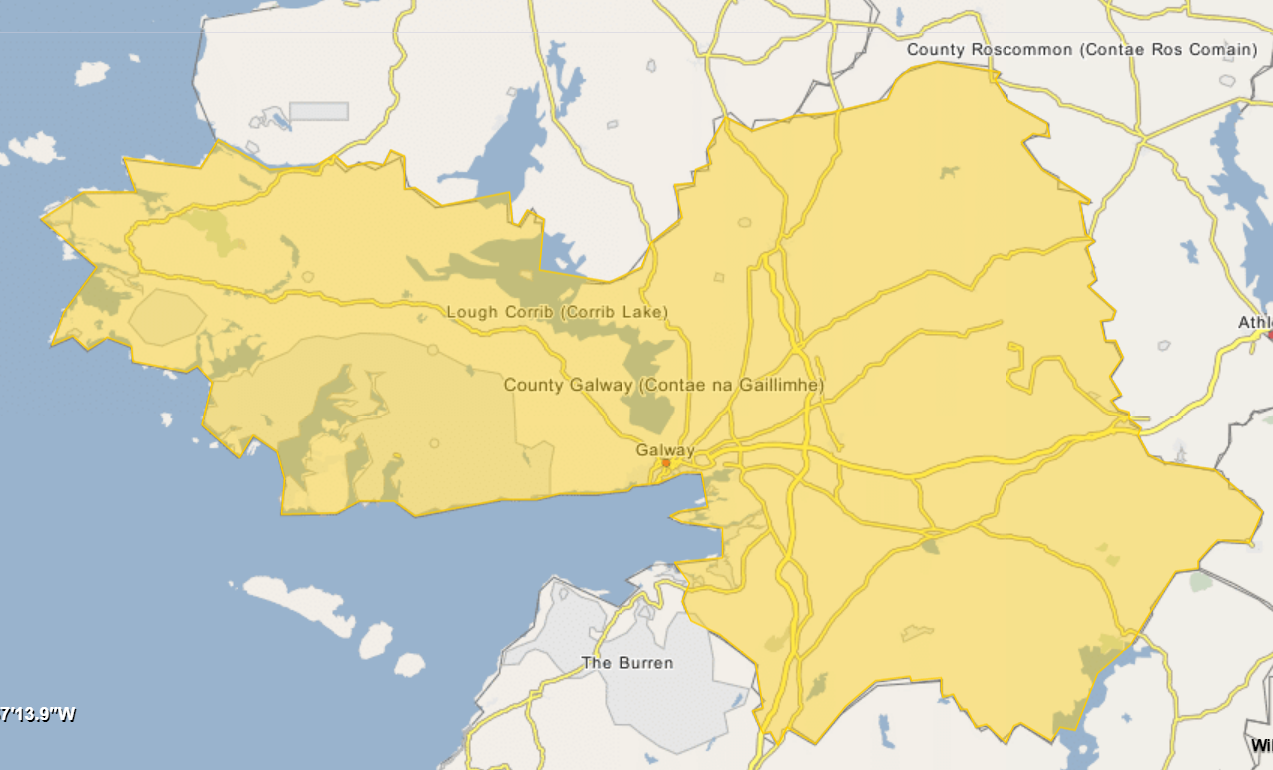
Locations of monastic houses in County Galway

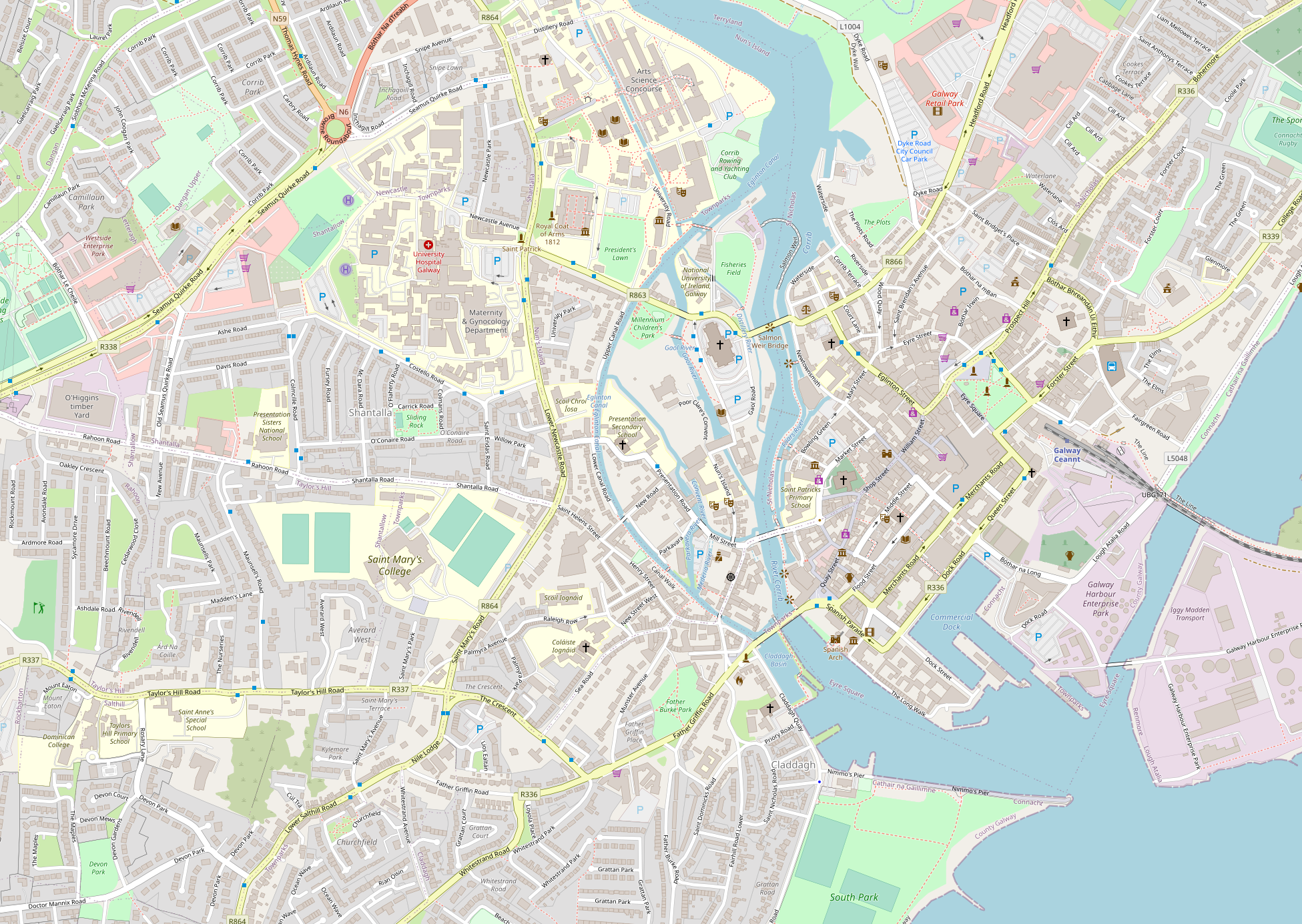
Locations of monastic houses in Galway
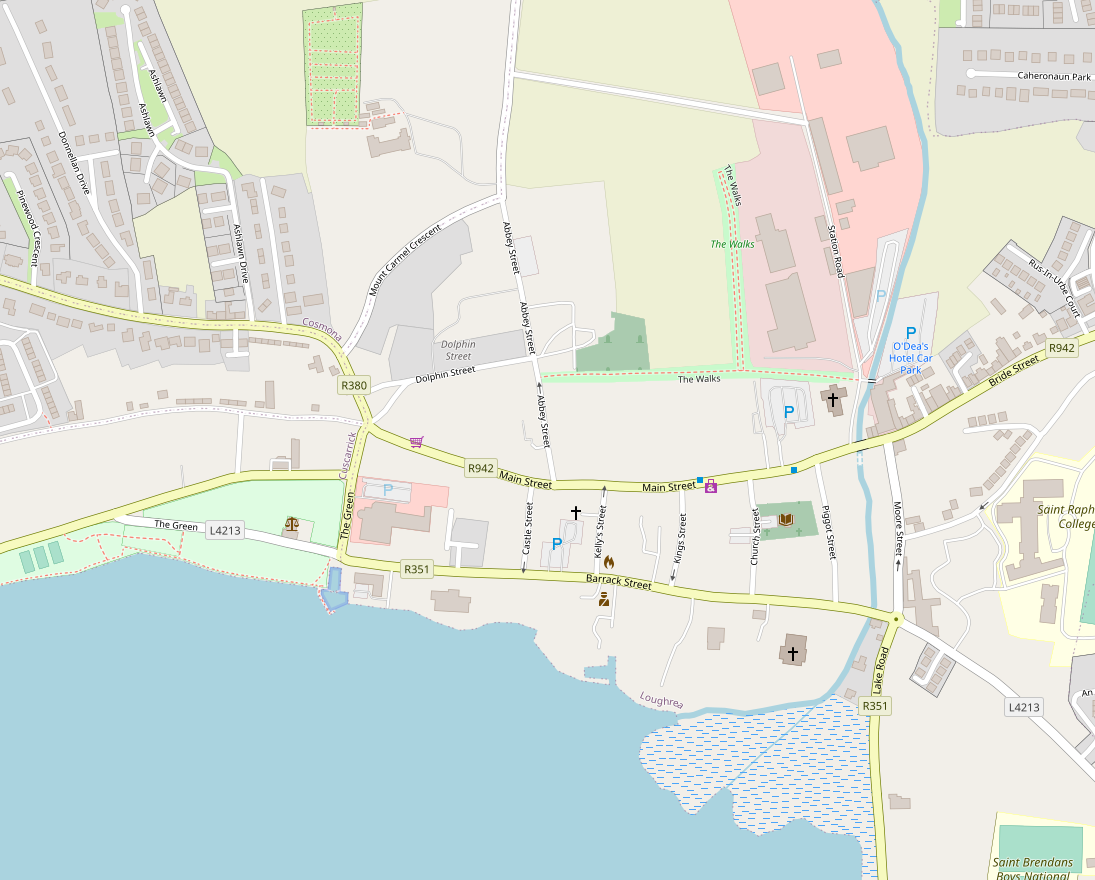
Locations of monastic houses in Loughrea
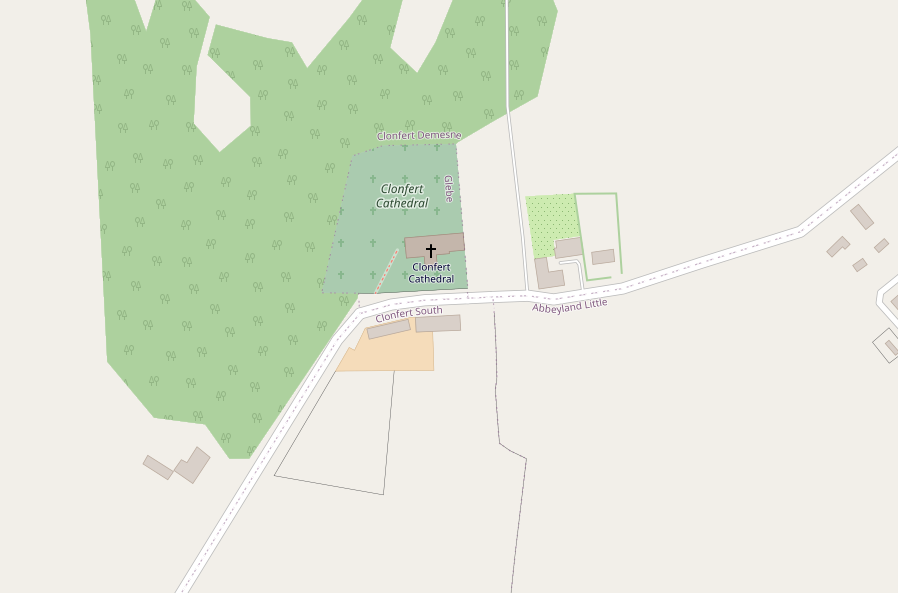
Locations of monastic houses in Clonfert
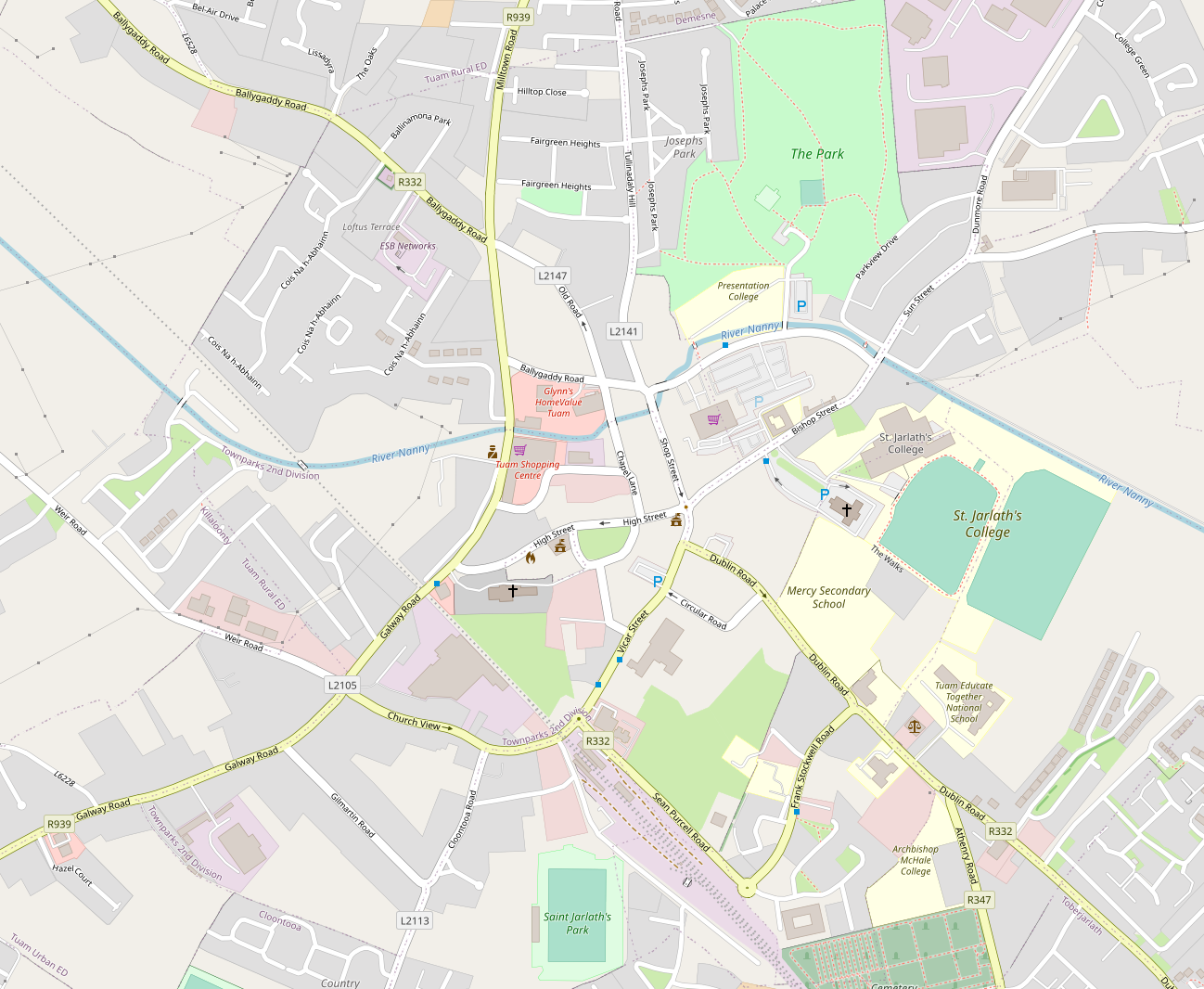
Locations of monastic houses in Tuam

Foundation	Image	Communities & provenance	Formal name or dedication & alternative names	References & location
Abbeygormacan Abbey		Augustinian Canons Regular founded before 1170?; dissolved 1543; granted to Ulick Bourke (William Ulick de Burgo Mac William), first Earl of Clanrickard (Clanricarde) 1543/1544, who probably did not evict the canons, who possibly remained until the reign of Elizabeth I	The Abbey Church of the Blessed Virgin Mary, Gormacan ____________________; Gormacan Abbey; Abbey Gormogan Abbey; Monaster O Gormogan; de Via Nova; Nova Via	53°12′52″N 8°20′57″W
Addergoole Abbey (Addergoole parish, near Ardcloon)		order, period and foundation unknown "Abbey (in ruins)" (Note: Ordnance Survey)		53°37′14″N 8°49′29″W
Ahascragh Abbey		early monastic site, reputedly founded by St Cuan; C.I. church on site	Ahaskeragh; Ath-ascrath; Ath-ascrach; Ath-escrach-Cuain	53°23′53″N 8°20′06″W
Annaghdown Abbey of St. John the Baptist		Premonstratensian Canons daughter house of Tuam; founded before 1224; raised to abbey status c.1236; dissolved after 1542?; apparently the abbey was the most northerly of the ruins (known as 'the Nunnery') at Annaghdown; dissolved 1562; granted to Richard, Earl of Clanricarde 1572; granted to the warden and vicars of King's College, Galway 8 July 1578	St John the Baptist de Cella Parva	53°23′18″N 9°04′19″W
Annaghdown Abbey of St Mary		Augustinian Canons and Canonesses Regular — Arroasian founded after c.1140, possibly by Turlough O'Conor at the instance of St Malachy; identification sometimes confused with the Premonstratensian foundation to the north; dissolved before 1578, granted to Richard, Earl of Clanricarde 1562	The Abbey of Saint Mary de Portu Patrum, Annaghdown	53°23′13″N 9°04′22″W
Annaghdown Cathedral & Nunnery		early monastic site, Gaelic nuns founded 6th (before 578) century by St Brendan for his sister Briga, site traditionally granted by the King of Connacht; Augustinian nuns — Arroaisian adopted after 1144; priory, dependent on Clonard; integrated into the Abbey of St Mary de Portu Patrum c.1144; episcopal diocesan cathedral before 1189 (and after 1152); church of St Mary Evachdun, cum villa Kelgel confirmed to the Arroaisians of Clonard 1195; dependent on Kilcreevannty from before 1223, church of St Mary Eanchduyn confirmed to the Arroasians of Kilcreevanty c.1123 and 1400; diocese united with Tuam 1327; canons and canonesses possibly shared the same church; dissolved after 1223-4, nuns possibly transferred to Inishmaine	Monastery of Lough Corrib; Annadown; Eanach-duine; Enaghcoin; Evachdun; Lough Corrib; Lough Orbsen	53°23′16″N 9°04′16″W
Annaghdown Friary	erroneously listed as Franciscan Friars (Note: Louis Augustin Alemand, Monasticum Hibernicum, translated and edited by John Stevens, 1722, pp.280, 234-5, mistakes Nenagh/Aonagh (Annagh/Enach) for Annaghdown, error replicated by others)			
Ardnabara Abbey in Killimordaly parish		possible monastic site — order, foundation and period unknown, "Ardnabara Abbey, in ruins"		53°19′18″N 8°34′45″W (approx)
Ardrahan Monastery		early monastic site; stump of round tower (Note: Lord Killanin & M. V. Duignan, Shell Guide to Ireland 1962, new edition 1967)	Ard-rathain	53°09′28″N 8°48′25″W
Athenry Priory		Dominican Friars founded 1241; dissolved 1574; granted to the town; reoccupied 1595; Regular Observant date unknown; dissolved c.1597, burned with the town during hostilities; friars granted a new site at Coilascail, infra; became a university 1644; site recovered by friars 1685, retained until the general exile 1698; used as a barracks 18th century; (NM)	The Priory Church of Saint Peter and Saint Paul ____________________; Ath-na-riogh; Ath-na-rig; Anry	53°17′54″N 8°44′40″W
Athenry Friary ^{≈}	erroneous reference to Franciscan Friars — mistaken identification of Adare Friary (Note: Wadding)			
Aughrim Priory		early monastic site, founded before 741; Augustinian Canons Regular - (?)Arroasian founded before 1170? or 1220, doubtfully purportedly by a Butler (Theobald Walter, first Butler of Ireland (Note: Harris's Table, in Ware-Harris, Antiquitie, 1745)), more likely by an O'Kelly, with a Butler as a later benefactor; burned 1307; dissolved c.1562?; granted to Richard, Earl of Clanricard; Augustinian Friars	St Catherine ____________________; Eachdruim; Acharym-Omane; Aghrim; Achdrum; Echraim; Enachdruim-Omane	53°18′14″N 8°19′04″W
Ballynahinch Friary		Carmelite Friars founded 1356 by O'Flaherty; dissolved during the reign of Elizabeth I; convent listed as re-established c.1737 (Note: Arch. Ord. Rome (Carmelite order), SM. II, C.O.. II. 26, p.13 (compiled 1739-59))	Baile-na-hinse; Ballinhinceh; Dalcaccense?	53°27′43″N 9°52′05″W (approx)
Ballynakill 'Abbey'		"Abbey", (Note: Ordnance Survey ½ inch) "Ellomaine Graveyard" (Note: Ordnance Survey 6 inch)	Ellomaine	
Beagh Friary (Barony of Clare)		Franciscan Friars, Third Order Regular founded after 1441; dissolved before 1585; granted to John Newton		53°31′06″N 9°00′32″W (approx)
Beagh Friary (Barony of Kiltartan) ^{≈}	Franciscan Friars, Third Order Regular — erroneous reference to the friary in the Barony of Clare (see immediately above)			
Boilean Clair	Franciscan Friars Minor, Conventual — actually Claregalway — erronesously identified as a separate foundation (Note: Louis Augustin Alemand, Monasticum Hibernicum, translated and edited by John Stevens, 1722, p.281 and Mervyn Archdall, Monasticon Hibernicum, 1786, p.277)			
Boley Friary		Dominican Friars — from Portumna apparently founded early 18th century	Boula; Buaile	53°08′05″N 8°43′06″W (approx)
Caheradreen Monastery		early monastic site		53°14′48″N 8°54′02″W (approx)
Caltra Friary		Carmelite Friars founded not later than 1336 (c.1320) by the Berminghams, barons of Athenry; dissolved 1589; granted to John Rawson 1589; restored 1735 (c.1737); closed c.1775	Kaltragh-ne-Pallice; Caltragh Pallas; Caltranapallice; Caltra-ne-Pallas; Callarense; Kaltragh-; Keal-; Pallice; Paileeshe	53°14′48″N 8°54′02″W
Claregalway Friary		Franciscan Friars Minor, Conventual founded before c.1252 by John de Colgan I; (Note: not John de Colgan II as suggested by Ware and others) dissolved 1542; granted to Richard de Burgo 1570; friars remained Observant Franciscan Friars adopted 1567?; dissolved c.1589, friars expelled by Sir Richard Bingham, who converted the buildings into barracks; friars permitted use of part of the monastery until expelled again; friars attempted to restore monastery after 1641; chapel in use until 18th century; (NM)	Claregalway Abbey; Clair; Baile-an-chlair; Boilean-Clair; Clar-dun-dunul	53°20′48″N 8°56′41″W
Cloghmore Monastery		early monastic site, founded 6th century by St Colmcille	Cloch-mor, in Killannin parish	53°13′43″N 9°31′26″W (approx)
Clonfert Abbey		Augustinian Canons Regular — Arroasian founded after 1140, possibly by Turlogh O'Conor, at the instance of St Malachy; dissolved 1571	St Mary's de Porto Puro	53°14′24″N 8°03′28″W
Clonfert Monastery		Gaelic monks founded before 577 or 583 by St Brendan the Navigator; episcopal diocesan cathedral 1111	Cluain-ferta-brenaind; Cluain-ferden	53°14′27″N 8°03′30″W
Clonfert, Monygayun Abbey		Augustinian nuns — Arroasian founded after 1144; dependent on Kilcreevanty from before 1223; dissolved during the reign of Elizabeth I	St Mary	
Clonkeenkerrill Friary		Franciscan Friars, Third Order Regular founded c.1435 by Thomas O'Kelly, Bishop of Clonfert, converting the church into a friary at the instance of David and John Mullkerrill; Franciscan Friars Minor, Conventual refounded 1453, papal permission obtained by David Mullkerrill	Cloonkeenkerrill; 'St. Kerrill's Abbey'	53°22′59″N 8°34′51″W
Clonkeenkerrill Monastery		early monastic site	Cluain-cain-cairill; Cluain-caoin-cairiolla; Cluacaen-Caeryll	
Clontuskert Priory		early monastic site, founded c.805 (before 809), by St Boedan; Augustinian Canons Regular - Arroasian founded after 1140, probably by the O'Kelly family; dissolved 1562; Augustinian Friars possibly restored 1637; (NM)	The Priory Church of Saint Mary, Clontuskert ____________________; Clontuskert Abbey; The Old Abbey; Cluain-tuaiskirt-ua-maine; Clontuskert-Omanny	53°16′47″N 8°12′42″W
Cloonfush Monastery		early monastic site, founded early 6th century by St Jarlath	Cluain-fois	53°30′55″N 8°54′05″W (approx)
Cloonyvornoge Friary		Franciscan Friars, Third Order Regular founded after 1441; dissolved 1585-6?; granted to John Newton 1597	Clonnavarnoge; Cowlevernoge; Cowleneringe	53°29′28″N 9°05′36″W (approx)
Coilascail Priory		Dominican Friars founded on a site granted by Ulrick Burke, Earl of Clanricarde		
Creevaghbaun Friary		Carmelite Friars founded 1332 by a member of the de Burgos family; dissolved 1574; granted to Thomas Lewis 1574; restored c.1737	Crevaghbane; Crevebane; Craghbane; Brenaghbane; Kribaghbane	53°29′33″N 8°46′01″W
Currabeg Monastery		monastic site, order, foundation and period unknown		
Donaghpatrick Monastery		early monastic site, founded by St Patrick	Domnach-patraic; Magna Saeoli	53°28′44″N 9°02′18″W (?)
Drumacoo Monastery		early monastic site	Druim-muccado; Droma-Mucada	53°11′55″N 8°54′17″W
Dunmore Monastery	misidentification of Donaghpatrick (Note: Mervyn Archdall, Monasticon Hibernicum, 1786, p.231 mistakenly states Dunmore Friary was located on the site of an early monastery)			
Dunmore Priory		early monastic site Augustinian Friars founded c.1423 (before 1425) by Walter Mor de Bermingham, 9th Baron Athenry; dissolved 1569, friars remained in occupancy; held by John Burke fitz Thomas 1574; friars left in 1645, taking refuge at Mayfield	Donmore Mac Oryshe; Downemore; Dominensis?	53°37′13″N 8°44′31″W
Eglish Friary		Carmelite friars founded 1393–1398; possibly abandoned during the reign of Elizabeth; possibly Franciscan Friars dissolved 1579	Monteceancohe; Sleushancough; Slewshancogh	53°23′03″N 8°17′45″W (approx)
Esker Friary		Dominican Friars — Regular Observance founded after 1622, site granted by Ulrick Burke, Earl of Clanricarde, at the request of the Provincial, Fr Ross Mageoghegan and other friars; it became St. Dominic's College used for formation of members of the order; friars left in the late 19th century, handing the convent over to the Diocese of Clonfert in 1893 who used it for a short time for clerical training.	Brosk; Coilascail	
Esker Monastery		Redemptorists, obtained the monastery from the Diocese in 1901. It was announced the ordered were ceasing their mission in Esker in 2021.		53°16′56″N 8°40′55″W
Fallig Friary ^{≈~}		Franciscan Friars - probable confusion for Killeigh (Fallig), County Offaly (Note: Mervyn Archdall, Monasticon Hibernicum, 1786, p.285 suggests Fallig (given as Observant Franciscans by Louis Augustin Alemand, Monasticum Hibernicum, translated and edited by John Stevens, 1722, p.289) is Faghy, County Galway)	Faghy; Fahy	
Galway Augustinian Friary		Augustinian Friars founded 1500 by Margaret Athy, at the request of Richard Nagle; dissolved before 1578; leased to the town 1578; demolished 1652 in order to use the strategic position of the site		53°16′17″N 9°02′49″W
Galway Augustinian Friary *, later site		Augustinian Friars; church opened 4 September 1859; extant		53°16′19″N 9°03′08″W
Galway Carmelite Priory		Carmelite Friars founded c.1332? possibly by a member of the de Burgo family; dissolved after 1648		
Galway Dominican Nunnery, first site		Dominican nuns founded 1644 in Augustine Street; exiled by the Cromwellians 1652; returned in 1686 to a house in Kirwan's Lane (see below)		53°16′19″N 9°03′08″W
Galway Dominican Nunnery, second site		Dominican nuns founded 1686 in Kirwan's Lane; expelled on a number of occasions 1691 convent, known as The Slate House, in use as barracks for British soldiers; fell into disrepair; destroyed by fire 1842		53°16′17″N 9°03′17″W
Galway Dominican Nunnery *, current site		Dominican nuns founded March 1845 on Taylors Hill, country house known as 'Mount Eaton' or 'Seaview', previously owned by the Sloper family; extant		53°16′05″N 9°04′43″W
Galway Franciscan Friary *		Franciscan Friars built 1660; rebuilt 1781; extant		53°16′34″N 9°03′17″W
Galway Franciscan Nunnery		Franciscan nuns, (?)Third Order founded 1511, church of St Nicholas purportedly granted by Walter Lynch to his daughter; dissolved during the reign of Elizabeth I	St Nicholas; ____________________; The house of the poor nuns of St Francis	
Galway Friary		Franciscan Friars Minor, Conventual founded 1296 by William de Burgo; Observant Franciscan Friars reformed 1460, and again before 1520; Conventuals and Observants apparently continued together, the latter in the minority; Conventuals attempted to evict Observants 1533 but were overruled; dissolved 1550; reoccupied during the reign of Queen Mary; leased to the mayor and townsmen c.1569, renewed 1578; community apparently extant until 1583 when the friars left and church burnt; returned 1612 and rebuilt the church; destroyed 1657; converted into a court house; current court house on site		53°16′31″N 9°03′15″W
Galway Priory		possibly formerly a hospital administered by the Premonstratensians; Premonstratensian Canons daughter house of Tuam; founded 1235, church purportedly granted to Tuam by the O'Halleran family; dissolved before 1451: relegated to chapel; left empty for a significant period by 1480; Dominican Friars founded 1488, granted licence by Innocent III; dissolved 1570; granted to the town corporation; possibly a vicariate of Athenry, raised to priory status 1612; dissolved 1651	Blessed Virgin Mary extra Muros; St Mary on the Hill	53°16′06″N 9°03′23″W
Gortnabishaun Monastery, Kilconla parish		early monastic site		53°32′32″N 9°01′36″W
Gorumna Island, Killanin parish		early monastic site, "abbey"	Gailimh; Galvia; Ngaillim; Bun-Gaillmhs; Bongal	53°14′09″N 9°41′56″W
Grange		Cistercian monks grange of Boyle	Grainsearchmhaonmhai; Grange of Mowyny	
High Island Monastery		early monastic site, founded before 665 by St Fechin	Ardoilen; Cellgradhaandomhain	53°32′39″N 10°15′44″W
Illaunmore Monastery	Historical county location. See List of monastic houses in County Clare			
Inchiquin Monastery		early monastic site, founded before 626 by St Brendan the Navigator	Inis-mac-ui-chuind; Insi-ui-chuinn; Inisquin	53°27′48″N 9°14′16″W
Inishark Monastery		early monastic site	Inisairc	53°36′22″N 10°16′04″W
Inishbofin Monastery		early monastic site, Gaelic monks founded 7th century by St Coleman supposed Benedictine monks — evidence lacking; suggested Augustinian Canons Regular during the reign of Henry VIII — evidence lacking	Inis-bofine; Bophin Island	53°36′56″N 10°11′20″W
Inisheer Monastery; Aran Islands		early monastic site	Ada-airthir; Ara-coemhain; Airdne-coimhain; Ardcoenmain?	53°03′35″N 9°32′11″W
Inishlackan Friary		purported Franciscan Friars (Note: Lord Killanin & M. V. Duignan, Shell Guide to Ireland, 1962 (1967 edition), p.414)		
Inishmaan Monastery; Aran Islands		early monastic site, two churches under the parish of St Enda, Inishmore	Inismedhon; Middle Island	53°04′52″N 9°35′42″W
Inishmicatreer Monastery		early monastic site; "Abbey in ruins"	'Inishmicatreer Abbey' ; Inish-mictreer	53°29′57″N 9°15′01″W
Inishmore Monastery; Aran Islands		early monastic site, purportedly granted to St Enda, aided by St Ailbe of Emly, by Oengus, King of Munster; Franciscan Friars, Third Order Regular (Note: Analecta Hibernica (Irish Manuscript Commission) No.6, November 1934 (OFM), i, p.104) or First Order (Note: Analecta Hibernica (Irish Manuscript Commission) No.6, November 1934 (OFM), i, p.27) founded after 1484, founder unknown; (Note: Analecta Hibernica (Irish Manuscript Commission) No.6, November 1934 (OFM), ii, p.161) First Order possibly transferred to the Third Order after 1560; dissolved ? (during the reign of Elizabeth I?), abandoned during the religious persecution	Ara-na-naemh; Ara-Enda; Killenda; Na Seacht dTeampaill; (The Seven Churches)	53°07′19″N 9°40′07″W
Inishnee Monastery		early monastic site, founded before 768	Inis-eidnigh?	53°23′34″N 9°54′06″W
Kilbennan Monastery		early monastic site, Gaelic monks founded by St Benignus (Benen), a disciple of St Patrick	Cell-beneoin; Dun Lughaid	53°32′19″N 8°53′31″W
Kilboght Friary		Franciscan Friars, Third Order Regular founded before 1507 by Hugo de Wall; dissolved after 1564; granted to Richard, Earl of Clanricarde	Kil-bought; kil-bout	
Kilcolgan Monastery, Kilmacduagh diocese		early monastic site, founded before c.580; erenagh until at least 1132; burned during war 1258		
Kilcolgan Monastery, Clonfert diocese?		early monastic site, founded 6th century by St Colmcille for Colgan (possibly same as immediately above)	Cell-colgain	
Kilcommedan Monastery		early monastic site	Cell-comadan	53°17′19″N 8°19′01″W (approx)
Kilconla Monastery		early monastic site, founded reputedly by St Conlat	Cell-connla; Kilconly	53°35′21″N 8°59′53″W
Kilconnell Friary		Franciscan Friars founded 1414 (1353 or c.1353) by William O'Kelly, Lord of Ui Maine; dissolved 1541; on the site of an earlier monastery (see immediately below); (NM)	Cell-chonaill; Kilconail	53°19′58″N 8°24′03″W
Kilconnell Monastery		early monastic site, founded 6th century by St Conall	Cell-chonaill; Kilconail	53°19′58″N 8°24′03″W
Kilcoona Monastery		early monastic site, founded by St Colmcille, site granted by Tibrades, son of Prince Maelduin, built by St Cuanna (Cuannach)	Cellcuannathe; Kilcoonagh	53°26′35″N 9°01′59″W
Kilcorban Friary		Dominican Friars dependent on Athenry; founded 1446; dissolved during the reign of Elizabeth I(?); site now occupied by St Corban's Church	Kilcarbain	53°07′31″N 8°18′22″W
Kilcreevanty Abbey		Benedictine nuns founded c.1200, chapel granted by Thomas de Burgo; Augustinian nuns — Arroasian refounded 1223; dissolved 1543	The Holy Rosary; The Blessed Virgin of the Holy Rosary ____________________; Cell-craobhnat; Kil-creunata; Kil-crevet; Casta Silva; Chaste Wood	53°33′48″N 8°54′14″W
Kilcummin Monastery ^{~}		early monastic site, founded by St Coeman	Kill-choemain; Cell-coemain	53°14′26″N 9°45′31″W (vaguely)
Kilkilvery Monastery		early monastic site; erenaghs until at least 11th century; later passed to the Fratres Cruciferi of Castledermot	Cell-cillbile	53°28′27″N 9°06′26″W (approx)
Killamanagh Priory		early monastic site; Premonstratensian Canons daughter house of Annaghdown; founded 1260 by an abbot of St John de Cella Parva, Annaghdown; dissolved c.1542?, probably suppressed	St Mary de Cella Parva; Cellnamanagh; Kilnamanoch; Killinimanach; Cella Parva St Mary; Cell-coemain	53°30′05″N 9°03′04″W
Killeely Monastery		early monastic site		53°12′33″N 8°51′25″W (approx)
Killeenmunterlane Monastery		early monastic site		53°11′54″N 8°53′14″W (approx)
Killower Monastery		early monastic site; erenaghs 11th century	Killawyr	53°30′47″N 8°57′14″W
Killursa Monastery		early monastic site, founded by St Fursa (Fursey); erenaghs at least to 11th century; church passed to the Fratres Cruciferi of Castledermot	Cell-fursa; Rathmat; Rathmath; Rathmuighe	53°28′04″N 9°08′42″W
Kilmacduagh Monastery		early monastic site, founded 6th-7th century by St Colman son of Duagh on land granted by Guaire, King ruined by William Fitz Adelm de Burgo early 13th century; episcopal diocesan cathedral 11th century; Augustinian Canons Regular founded 1225-50; dissolved 1584; granted to Richard, Earl of Clanricarde	St Mary de Petra ____________________; Cell-mic-duaich; Duaca; Kil-macough	53°02′53″N 8°53′17″W
Kilmeen Monastery		early monastic site	Cell-mian	53°12′19″N 8°29′51″W
Kilmurry Friary		Franciscan Friars given as Dominican Friars (Note: H. T. Knox, Notes on Early History of Dioceses of Tuam, Killala and Achonry, 1904, p.296)	Cell-mhuire; Kilmurray	53°34′09″N 8°41′22″W
Kilreekill Monastery		early monastic site, nuns reputedly founded by St Patrick for his sister Richella	Cell-richill	53°13′49″N 8°27′13″W
Kiltiernan Monastery		early monastic site	Cell-tighernain	53°11′17″N 8°50′33″W
Kiltullagh Monastery		early monastic site; possibly not continuing after 10th century	Cell-tulach-mhaonmhai	53°18′47″N 8°57′18″W (approx)
Kinalehin Friary, nr Abbey		Carthusian monks — possibly from Hinton founded c.1252 by John de Cogan I; purportedly destroyed 1279 and if so, rebuilt soon after; sold to the Hospital of St John of Jerusalem 1306 - the Knights appear to have held appurtenances, though the sale appears never to have completed; dissolved by General Chapter the Grande Chartreuse 1321; abandoned by the monks c.1341; Franciscan Friars Minor, Conventual refounded c.1371 by the de Burgos, granted by the Pope; destroyed after the general suppression; purchased from Elizabeth I by Richard de Burgo (Rufus), Earl of Clanricarde, who retained it for the friars dissolved before 1609; Observant Franciscan Friars refounded 1611; dissolved after 1642; friars probably expelled under the Cromwellians; returned during the reign of Charles II	Abbey; Kilnalahan; Kinaleghin; Kenaloyn; Cenel-Feichin; Cineoil-Feichin; Kilnalekin; Kinelfeichin	53°06′10″N 8°23′39″W
Kinvarra Monastery		early monastic site, patron St Coman	Ceamm-mhara; Cenn-mara	53°08′21″N 8°56′13″W
Knockmoy Abbey		Cistercian monks — from Boyle founded 1190 by Cathal Crobderg O'Conor, King of Connacht; dissolved 1542, surrendered by Abbot Hugh O'Kelly 24 May 1542, though a secularised form of monasticism apparently continued; let to Andrew Brereton for 21 years, 1566; part granted to Nicholas FitzSymons 1568; QE	Abbeyknockmoy Abbey; Collis Victoriae; Cnoc-muaidhe; Knockmuighe; Mainister-cnoc-muaide	53°26′26″N 8°44′33″W
Kylemore Abbey		Benedictine nuns Abbey founded in 1920 by nuns from Ypres, Belgium. Mansion served as convent boarding school until closure in 2010		53°33′42″N 9°53′22″W
Lissonuffy Cell	Historical county location. See List of monastic houses in County Roscommon			
Loughrea Priory		Carmelite Friars founded c.1300 by Richard de Burgo, Earl of Ulster; dissolved before 1541; granted to Richard, Earl of Clanricarde 1652; friars permitted to remain; Teresian (Discalced) Carmelites occupied intermittently from 1640	St Mary ____________________; Loch-riach; Laughreagh; Lough-Reogh; Balliloc riagh	53°11′56″N 8°34′08″W
Loughrea Abbey *		Discalced Carmelite Friars founded 19th century; extant		53°12′01″N 8°34′13″W
Maghee Monastery ^{~}		early monastic site, possibly County Galway, location unidentified	Mag-Cé; Magele; Magelle; Magtriudi	location unknown
Mayfield		Augustinian Friars refuge from Dunmore 1645		
Meelick Friary ^{+}		Franciscan Friars Minor, Conventual founded 1414, mandate to license a Franciscan foundation issued to the Bishop of Clonfert by the Pope; Observant Franciscan Friars refounded 1479; dissolved 1559, suppressed and ruined; restored 1595; dissolved after 1595; granted to the Earl of Clanricarde; church and buildings largely destroyed by c.1616; Observant Franciscan Friars 1680, intermittently until 1852; now R.C. church	Mil-eagh; Miliuc; Milick; Mykescin	53°10′25″N 8°05′08″W
Monasternalea Monastery		early monastic site erroneously purportedly Franciscan Friars, (Note: Canice Mooney, The Franciscans in Ireland, Terminus (Mar-Apr 1956), p.143) — reliable evidence lacking	Abbey Grey Monastery; Abbeygrey Monastery; Mainistir na Liath; Kilmore-ne-togher?	53°33′29″N 8°21′56″W
Moor Abbey, parish of Athenry		Cistiercian monks? possibly chapel of Moor Aughrim at a grange of Knockmoy		
Omey Monastery		early monastic site, founded 7th century by St Fechin of Fore with the aid of King Guare; ruins excavated and re-sited by archaeologists in 1990s	Iomaidh; Immagh; Temple-feheen	53°32′08″N 10°10′31″W (ruins re-sited at 53°32′02″N 10°09′26″W)
Portumna Friary		Dominican monks founded before 1414 by Murchad? O'Madden, Lord, on the site of the Cistercian monks' priory (see immediately below); dissolved c.1582; granted to the Earls of Clanricarde 1582; part used as C.I. church 1631; choir became C.I. church 1762; Observant refounded before 1426	The Friary Church of the Blessed Virgin Mary, Portumna ____________________; Portumna Abbey	53°05′10″N 8°13′03″W
Portumna Priory		Cistercian monks chapel, dependent on Dunbrody; founded 1254; became disused; Dominican friary founded on site (see immediately above)	The Priory Church of Saint Peter and Saint Paul, Portumna ____________________; Portumna Abbey; Portomna; Portompria	53°05′10″N 8°13′03″W
Rafwee Monastery		early monastic site, coarb 11th century	Raithbuidhe	53°26′55″N 9°04′13″W (approx)
Rathmagh Monastery		early monastic site, founded 6th century by St Brendan of Clonfert	Raithmaige	53°27′04″N 9°10′38″W (approx)
Roscam		early monastic site, founded before 779; destroyed by the Danes 807	Ros-chaim; Ros-camm	
Ross Errilly Friary		Franciscan Friars Minor, Conventual founded 1351 (1431) by Raymond de Burgo; Observant Franciscan Friars reformed 1470 (1498) by the Grannard family (William, Lord Grannard?); dissolved 1562; granted to the Earl of Clanricarde by Elizabeth I 1562; friars afforded protection by Clanricarde friars left before 1580; re-established by Clanricarde 1580; expelled by Protestants and English soldiers 1580; occupied by English soldiers 1596; friars reinstated before 1601; abandoned by friars to escape imprisonment; reinstated 1611 by Clanricarde; expelled 1612; returned 1626 and 1641; abandoned 1656; reoccupied and repaired 1664; abandoned after 1688; returned 1712; possibly expelled 1731; returned 1753, restored by Lord St George; dissolved 1832; ruinous by 1835; (NM)	Ross; Ross-erelly; Ross-eriall; Ros-traily; Ros-oirbealaigh; Ruisairbhealaigh; Iriala	53°28′47″N 9°07′54″W
Rosshill Monastery		early monastic site, reputedly founded by St Brendan of Clonfert; "'Abbey' site"	Teampull Brandon	53°33′15″N 9°22′07″W
Roundstone Monastery	Historical photo; Historical photo	Franciscan Friars, Third Order Regular founded 1835; site redeveloped		53°23′32″N 9°54′59″W
St Macdara's Island Monastery		early emeritical monastic site, founded by St (Sionnach) Mac Dara	Cruach Macdara; Cruanacara	53°18′12″N 9°55′05″W
Templemoyle-Kiltullagh Friary		Franciscan Friars, Third Order Regular founded after 1441; dissolved 1595; granted to Edmond Barrett	Tombmoyle	53°20′19″N 8°41′39″W
Tisaxon Friary		Franciscan Friars, Third Order Regular founded before 1442, mandate issued to the Bishop of Ballysadare by the Pope; dissolved 1574; granted to Thomas Lewes 5 April 1574	Teagh-saxon; Theascaston; Trachsasson cf. Templegal	53°20′31″N 8°42′10″W
Toghergar Friary		purported Franciscan Friars — reliable evidence lacking		
Toombeola Abbey		Dominican Friars dependent on Athenry; apparently founded after January 1427 by Chieftain O'Flaherty, when papal licence obtained to build a monastery; dubiously suggested Augustinian Friars - Dominicans possibly gave shelter to friars of other orders in penal periods dissolved after 1558; seized by the Protestants reoccupied 18th century	St Patrick ____________________; Tuaim-beola; Tom-beola; Tum-beola	53°25′52″N 9°51′52″W
Tuam Monastery ^{+}		early monastic site, founded 6th century by St Jarlath (Iarlath); episcopal diocesan cathedral 1111; extant		53°30′55″N 8°50′51″W
Tuam Augustinian Abbey		Augustinian Canons Regular — Arroasian priory or hospital founded c.1140 by Turlogh O'Connor; raised to abbey status c.1360?; dissolved c.1562, c.1572; granted to Richard, Earl of Clanricarde; Augustinian Friars refounded	St John the Evangelist ____________________; St John in the suburbs	
Tuam Friary		Fratres Cruciferi founded 1140 by an O'Connor		
Tuam Nunnery		purported nuns or Premonstratensian Canonesses — evidence lacking; a tenement owned by the Arroasian nuns of Kilcrevanty existed in Tuam (Tuaym) 1223-4		
Tuam Premonstratensian Abbey		Premonstratensian Canons daughter house of Cockersand?; founded 1203-4?; revived from Prémontre? 1217-8?; burned with the town and other churches 1244; dissolved c.1574	The Holy Trinity ____________________; Tuaim-da-ghuallann; Tuaim-da-gualand; Tuaim-da-valuin	53°30′52″N 8°51′11″W
Tuam Abbey of the Scrin ^{≈}		order, foundation and period unknown — listed 1574; the church of the Shrine apparently adjacent to the cathedral — possible reference to the vicars' college or Fratres Cruciferi		

== Map link to lists of monastic houses in Ireland by county ==
Click on a county to go to the corresponding article.	Antrim; Armagh; Down; Fermanagh; Londonderry; Tyrone; Carlow; Cavan; Clare; Cork; Donegal; Dublin; Galway; Kerry; Kildare; Kilkenny; Laois; Leitrim; Limerick; Longford; Louth; Mayo; Meath; Monaghan; Offaly; Roscommon; Sligo; Tipperary; Waterford; Westmeath; Wexford; Wicklow

== See also ==
- List of monastic houses in Ireland
