= Tim Larkin =

Tim or Timothy Larkin may refer to:

- Tim Larkin (composer), American video game composer
- Tim Larkin (self-defense), American self-defense expert
- Timothy F. Larkin (died 1960), American football player and coach
