= Larkin =

Larkin may refer to:

== Buildings and structures ==
- Larkin Administration Building, a destroyed building of the defunct Larkin Soap Company
- Larkin Terminal Warehouse, original warehouse of the defunct Larkin Soap Company
- Larkin Stadium, a football stadium in Johor Bahru, Malaysia

== Business and organizations ==
- Larkin Aircraft Supply Company, a former Australian aircraft manufacturer
- Larkin Company, a former mail-order company based in Buffalo, New York
- Larkin University, Miami Gardens, Florida
- Philip Larkin Society

== Places ==
- Larkin, Alabama, U.S.
- Larkin, California, U.S.
- Larkin Township, Minnesota
- Larkin Charter Township, Michigan
- Larkin, Johor, Malaysia
- Larkin (state constituency), Johor, Malaysia
- Larkin Sentral, a bus terminal in Johor Bahru, Malaysia

== People ==
- Larkin (name), a given name and surname

== Other uses ==
- Larkin 25, a former arts festival in Kingston upon Hull, England
- Larkin High School, Elgin, Illinois, U.S.

== See also ==
- Senator Larkin (disambiguation)
- Larken
- Larkins (disambiguation)
