= Ambrose Ó Madadhan =

Irish Dominican prior

Ambrose Ó Madadhan, first Prior of Portumna Priory.

The Dominican Order had been established in Portumna before the 17th century, its first patrons apparently the Ó Madadhan lords of Síol Anmchadha. Ambrose's name was an Anglicisation of the Gaelic Anmchadh, first born by his ancestor Anmchadh mac Eogan Buac. He was possibly closely related to Domhnall Ó Madadhan, the last Chief of Síol Anmchadha.

With the Cromwellian conquest of Ireland in 1652, the community were either expelled, exiled or killed. The lands were given to Henry Cromwell. Ambrose's subsequent fate is unknown.

Preceded by new creation	Prior of Portumna; 1640 - a.1652?	Succeeded by Richard Ó Madadhan?
