= Anthony McHugo =

Anthony McHugho (died 24 July 1711) was the third and last attested Prior of Portumna Priory.

Little appears to be known of McHugo. However, he was a likely descendant of Chief of the Name Edmond MacHugo, several of whose descendants were clergy in the Loughrea-Portumna area.

The Dominicans and all other Catholic clergy had been formally expelled on 1 May 1698, but some appear to have remained and by the early 18th century had reoccupied the priory. Fr. McHugo died there on 24 July 1711. Afterwards, the community quit Portumna for good and re-established at Boula Friary, near Kilreekill, Loughrea.

From 1762 to 1810 the priory was used by the Protestant church, until a new one was built at Christ Church. The Priory was taken into state care in 1951.

Preceded by Richard Ó Madadhan	Prior of Portumna ? - 24 July 1711	Succeeded by vacant
