= Larkins =

Larkins may refer to:

== People ==
- Brian A. Larkins (1946–2025), American molecular biologist
- Dick Larkins (1909–1977), athletic director at the Ohio State University 1947–1970
- Ellis Larkins (1923–2002), African-American jazz pianist
- Erlana Larkins (born 1986), American professional basketball player
- Greta Larkins (born 20th century), Australian actress
- John Davis Larkins, Jr. (1909–1990), American federal judge
- Nick Larkins (born 20th century), Australian rock musician
- Patrick Larkins (1860–1918), American baseball player
- Paul Larkins (born 1963), retired English athlete
- Peter Larkins (born 1954), Australian doctor, media personality, former athlete
- Richard Larkins (born 1943), Vice-Chancellor and President of Monash University 2003–2009
- Wayne Larkins (1953–2025), English cricketer
- William Larkins (died 1800), member of the Royal Society, formerly an accountant in Bengal
- William Larkins Bernard FRIBA (1843–1922), English architect, active in Bristol and London

== Other uses ==
- Larkins (1808 ship)
- Larkins Peak, a mountain in Idaho, USA

== See also ==
- Larkin (disambiguation)
- Alvin Larkins Park, park in the Madrona neighborhood of Seattle, Washington
- Sir Frederick Larkins Currie, 2nd Baronet (1823–1900), English baronet
- John Richardson (New Zealand politician) (1810–1878), New Zealand politician and cabinet minister
