= Anmchadh mac Eogan Buac =

Anmchadh mac Eoghan Buac, Prince of Síol Anmchadha, died c.757.

Anmchad was a son of Eoghan Buac (the generous), who was of the Uí Maine and a descendant of Maine Mór, who founded the kingdom some centuries previously.

Anmchad had a brother, Forbassach, from whom the Larkin family would descend.

Little else is known of Anmchad, but he gave his name to the dynasty and kingdom of Síol Anmchadha in what is now south-east County Galway. His descendant, Madudan mac Gadhra Mór, was the ancestor of the Madden family.
