= Richard Ó Madadhan =

Irish Roman Catholic prior

Richard Ó Madadhan (c. 1620 – late 1691) was Prior of Portumna Priory in 1691.

Ó Madadhan was born about 1620, and was a native of Portumna. He studied at Avila but could not return to Ireland because of the Cromwellian Wars. He instead taught at Utrecht in Belgium.

The Dominicans had been established before the 17th century. Their establishment was erected into a priory in 1640 under Ambrose Ó Madadhan but they were forced to abandon it during the Cromwellian era. They seem to have been re-established during The Restoration.

Richard's length of tenure is unclear. However, he and the rest of the community were obliged to abandon the area in the aftermath of the Battle of Aughrim in July 1691. Hunted by Williamite forces, Ó Madadhan fled into "an impassable bog" but ultimately died of starvation.

Preceded by Ambrose Ó Madadhan?	Prior of Portumna; 1686? – a. 1691	Succeeded by Anthony McHugo?
