= Stripe Mountain =

Mountain in Idaho, United States

- Location within Idaho

Highest point
- Elevation: 9,001 ft (2,744 m)
- Prominence: 2081
- Parent peak: Cottonwood Butte
- Coordinates: 45°30′48″N 114°46′28″W

Geography
- Location: Idaho and Lemhi counties, Idaho, U.S.
- Parent range: South Clearwater Mountains, Bitterroot Range
- Topo map: USGS Stripe Mountain

Stripe Mountain is the highest point in both the South Clearwater Mountains and the Clearwater Mountains as a whole, part of the Bitterroot Range and Rocky Mountains in the panhandle of Idaho in the Western United States. Its summit is at an elevation of 9,001 ft (2,744 m) and the mountain's ridgeline forms the boundary of Idaho County and Lemhi County. The Idaho County portion of the mountain lies within the Bitterroot National Forest and the Lemhi County portion of the mountain lies within the Salmon-Challis National Forest, and the entirety of the mountain lies within the Frank Church-River of No Return Wilderness Area.
