= John Larkin =

John Larkin may refer to:

== Businessmen and public officials ==
- John Larkin (barrister), Attorney General for Northern Ireland as of May 2, 2020
- John D. Larkin (1845–1926), American businessman
- John Larkin Jr. (1804–1896), American businessman, banker and politician
- John Larkin, English politician who competed in Liverpool City Council election, 1946

== Performers ==
- John Larkin (actor, born 1877) (1877–1936), African-American film actor and songwriter
- John Larkin (actor, born 1912) (1912–1965), American actor in radio dramas
- John Paul Larkin (1942–1999), American scat singing musician known as Scatman John

== Religious figures ==
- John Larkin (Deacon of Charlestown) (1735–1807), American Revolutionary War-era minister
- John Larkin (Jesuit) (1801–1858), American president of Fordham University

== Writers ==
- John Larkin (author) (born 1963), Australian author
- John Larkin (screenwriter) (1901–1965), American screenwriter

== Others ==
- John Larkin, American Quaker settler in 17th century (Larkin's Hill Farm)
- John Larkin, husband of Swedish-American folk sculptor Anna Larkin (1855–1939)
- John Larkin (rugby league), Australian rugby league footballer

== See also ==
- John Davis Larkins Jr. (1909–1990), American judge
- Larkin (disambiguation)
