= James Larkin (disambiguation) =

James Larkin or Jim Larkin (1874–1947) was an Irish trade union leader, politician and socialist activist.

James Larkin or Jim Larkin may also refer to:

- James Larkin (actor) (born 1963), English actor
- James Larkin (Independent Fianna Fáil) (1932–1998), Irish politician from Donegal, nominated as Senator in 1982
- James E. Larkin, American astrophysicist
- James Larkin Jnr (1904–1969), Irish Labour Party politician and trade union official
- Jim Larkin (American football) (born 1939), American football coach at Saginaw Valley State University
- Jim Larkin (publisher) (1949–2023), publisher of the Phoenix New Times and co-owner of Backpage
- Jim Larkin (Canadian politician) (1946–2023), Canadian politician and businessman
