= Larkins Peak =

Mountain in Idaho, United States

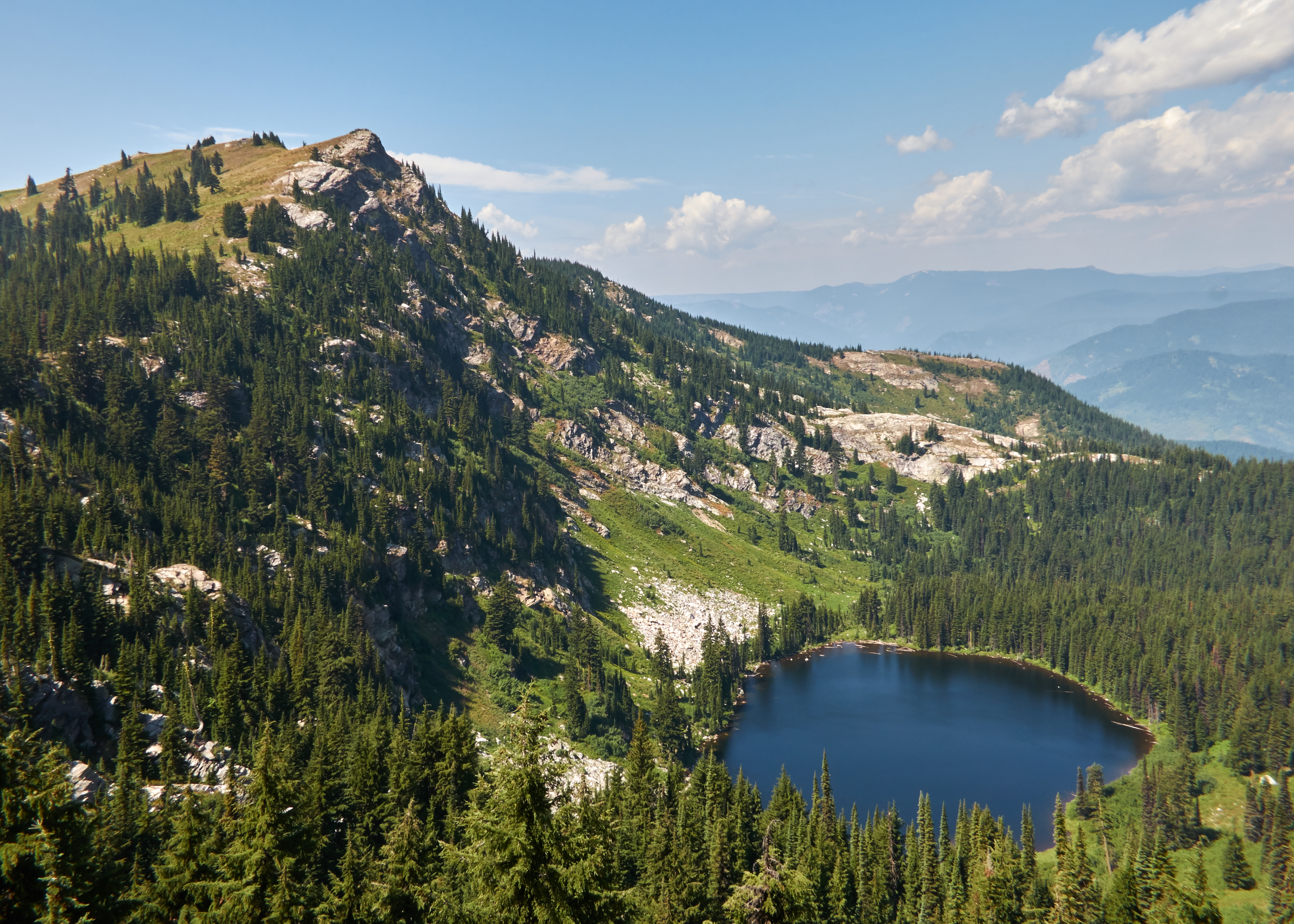
- Larkins Peak and Larkins Lake, from east

Highest point
- Elevation: 6,661 ft (2,030 m)
- Prominence: 521 ft (159 m)
- Parent peak: Crag Peak (6,879 ft)
- Isolation: 1.3 mi (2.1 km)
- Coordinates: 46°56′51″N 115°37′11″W

Naming
- Etymology: John Larkins

Geography
- Location within Idaho Location within the United States
- Country: United States
- State: Idaho
- County: Shoshone
- Protected area: Mallard-Larkins Pioneer Area
- Parent range: Clearwater Mountains; Rocky Mountains
- Topo map: USGS Mallard Peak

Climbing
- Easiest route: class 1 hiking

Larkins Peak is a 6,661-foot-elevation (2,030 m) mountain summit in Shoshone County, Idaho, United States.

== Description ==
Larkins Peak is part of the Clearwater Mountains which are a subrange of the Rocky Mountains. The remote mountain is situated 45 miles (72 km) northeast of Orofino, Idaho, in the Mallard-Larkins Pioneer Area, on land managed by Idaho Panhandle National Forests. Precipitation runoff from the mountain's slopes drains into tributaries of the North Fork Clearwater River. Topographic relief is significant as the summit rises 1,140 feet (347 meters) above headwaters of Larkins Creek in 0.4 miles (0.64 km). This landform's toponym has been officially adopted by the United States Board on Geographic Names. Larkins Creek, Larkins Peak, and Larkins Lake are probably named after John Larkins, a pioneering homesteader and trapper who ranged over this area and was long since deceased by 1919 when the toponyms were officially adopted.

== Climate ==
Based on the Köppen climate classification, Larkins Peak is located in an alpine subarctic climate zone with long, cold, snowy winters, and cool to warm summers. Winter temperatures can drop below 0 °F with wind chill factors below −10 °F.

== See also ==
- List of mountain peaks of Idaho
