= Edward Larkin (disambiguation) =

Edward Larkin (1880–1915) was an Australian rugby union player and politician.

Edward Larkin may also refer to:

- Edward Larkin (American football) (1882–1948), American football coach
- Edward H. Larkin, Massachusetts politician, Mayor of Medford 1927–1931
- Edward P. Larkin (1915–1986), New York politician
