= James E. Larkin =

American astrophysicist and academic

- Occupations: Astrophysicist and academic

Academic background
- Education: B.S., Physics and Mathematics; M.S., Physics; Ph.D., Physics
- Alma mater: California State University, East Bay; California Institute of Technology

Academic work
- Institutions: University of California, Los Angeles

James E. Larkin is an American astrophysicist and an academic. He is a professor of physics and astronomy at University of California, Los Angeles (UCLA). Larkin's research interests include extragalactic astrophysics, adaptive optics (AO), and infrared instrumentalization. He has been a recipient of the Alfred P. Sloan research fellowship. According to Scopus, his research has been cited 9,922 times.

== Education ==
Larkin received a B.S. in Physics and Mathematics from California State University, East Bay (formerly known as California State University at Hayward) in 1990. In 1992, he completed his M.S. in Physics from California Institute of Technology and in 1996, earned a Ph.D. in Physics from the same institute. Between 1995 and 1997, he was a McCormick postdoctoral fellow at the University of Chicago.

== Career ==
Larkin joined UCLA in 1997 as professor at the department of Physics and Astronomy. As a principal investigator and co-investigator for projects, he has worked on projects related to imaging devices for astrophysics, including the NIRC2, OSIRIS for the Keck Observatory, the Gemini Planet Imager for the Gemini International Telescopes, and IRIS for the Thirty Meter Telescope. As member of the UCLA Infrared Lab since 1997, he has contributed towards the development and design of diffraction-limited and infrared imaging devices for astrophysics, including OSIRIS.

== Research ==
Larkin's research has focused on developing instruments and methods for high-contrast astronomical imaging and extragalactic astronomy. Alongside colleagues, he introduced the Karhunen–Loève Image Projection (KLIP) algorithm, which was designed to reveal faint exoplanets hidden by their host star's light. As part of the research team that developed the Gemini Planet Imager (GPI), he led the development of the integral field spectrograph. The GPI was subsequently used to detect a young Jovian planet, named 51 Eri b.

Larkin led the team that designed and developed OSIRIS, an integral field spectrograph with a spectral resolution of 3800, which achieved a relatively large field of view by the use of a Rockwell Hawaii-2 detector and packing the spectra closely together. Using OSIRIS integral field spectroscopy, he collaboratively made observations of the kinematic structure of z ~ 2-3 galaxies which provided data on star formation activities at these epochs.

In collaboration with Andrea Ghez for research relating to supermassive black holes, he investigated star clusters using the Keck II telescope. As of 2025, as per Scopus, his work has received 9,922 citations.

== Awards and honors ==
- 1993 – John Stemple Award, California Institute of Technology
- 1995 – Robert R. McCormick Postdoctoral fellowship, University of Chicago
- 2000 – Research fellowship, Alfred P. Sloan Foundation

== Selected articles ==
- McLean, Ian S.; Becklin, Eric E.; Bendiksen, Oddvar; Brims, George; Canfield, John; Figer, Donald F.; Graham, James R.; Hare, Jonah; Lacayanga, Fred; Larkin, James E.; Larson, Samuel B.; Levenson, Nancy; Magnone, Nick; Teplitz, Harry; Wong, Woon (1998). "Design and development of NIRSPEC: A near-infrared echelle spectrograph for the Keck II telescope". In Fowler, Albert M. (ed.). Infrared Astronomical Instrumentation. Proceedings of SPIE. Vol. 3354. pp. 566–578. Bibcode:1998SPIE.3354..566M. doi:10.1117/12.317283. ISSN 0277-786X.
- Ghez, A. M.; Duchêne, G.; Matthews, K.; Hornstein, S. D.; Tanner, A.; Larkin, J.; Morris, M.; Becklin, E. E.; Salim, S.; Kremenek, T.; Thompson, D.; Soifer, B. T.; Neugebauer, G.; McLean, I. (2003). "The First Measurement of Spectral Lines in a Short-Period Star Bound to the Galaxy's Central Black Hole: A Paradox of Youth". The Astrophysical Journal. 586 (2): L127–L131. arXiv:astro-ph/0302299. Bibcode:2003ApJ...586L.127G. doi:10.1086/374804. ISSN 0004-637X.
- Soummer, Rémi; Pueyo, Laurent; Larkin, James (2012). "Detection and Characterization of Exoplanets and Disks Using Projections on Karhunen-Loève Eigenimages". The Astrophysical Journal. 755 (2): L28. arXiv:1207.4197. Bibcode:2012ApJ...755L..28S. doi:10.1088/2041-8205/755/2/L28. ISSN 0004-637X.
- Macintosh, Bruce; Graham, James R.; Ingraham, Patrick; Konopacky, Quinn; Marois, Christian; Perrin, Marshall; Poyneer, Lisa; Bauman, Brian; Barman, Travis; Burrows, Adam S.; Cardwell, Andrew; Chilcote, Jeffrey; De Rosa, Robert J.; Dillon, Daren; Doyon, Rene; Dunn, Jennifer; Erikson, Darren; Fitzgerald, Michael P.; Gavel, Donald; Goodsell, Stephen; Hartung, Markus; Hibon, Pascale; Kalas, Paul; Larkin, James; Maire, Jerome; Marchis, Franck; Marley, Mark S.; McBride, James; Millar-Blanchaer, Max; Morzinski, Katie; Norton, Andrew; Oppenheimer, B. R.; Palmer, David; Patience, Jennifer; Pueyo, Laurent; Rantakyro, Fredrik; Sadakuni, Naru; Saddlemyer, Leslie; Savransky, Dmitry; Serio, Andrew; Soummer, Remi; Sivaramakrishnan, Anand; Song, Inseok; Thomas, Sandrine; Wallace, J. Kent; Wiktorowicz, Sloane; Wolff, Schuyler (2014). "First light of the Gemini Planet Imager". Proceedings of the National Academy of Sciences. 111 (35): 12661–12666. arXiv:1403.7520. Bibcode:2014PNAS..11112661M. doi:10.1073/pnas.1304215111. PMC 4156769. PMID 24821792.
- Macintosh, B.; Graham, J. R.; Barman, T.; De Rosa, R. J.; Konopacky, Q.; Marley, M. S.; Marois, C.; Nielsen, E. L.; Pueyo, L.; Rajan, A.; Rameau, J.; Saumon, D.; Wang, J. J.; Patience, J.; Ammons, M.; Arriaga, P.; Artigau, E.; Beckwith, S.; Brewster, J.; Bruzzone, S.; Bulger, J.; Burningham, B.; Burrows, A. S.; Chen, C.; Chiang, E.; Chilcote, J. K.; Dawson, R. I.; Dong, R.; Doyon, R.; Draper, Z. H.; Duchêne, G.; Esposito, T. M.; Fabrycky, D.; Fitzgerald, M. P.; Follette, K. B.; Fortney, J. J.; Gerard, B.; Goodsell, S.; Greenbaum, A. Z.; Hibon, P.; Hinkley, S.; Cotten, T. H.; Hung, L.-W.; Ingraham, P.; Johnson-Groh, M.; Kalas, P.; Lafreniere, D.; Larkin, J. E.; Lee, J.; Line, M.; Long, D.; Maire, J.; Marchis, F.; Matthews, B. C.; Max, C. E.; Metchev, S.; Millar-Blanchaer, M. A.; Mittal, T.; Morley, C. V.; Morzinski, K. M.; Murray-Clay, R.; Oppenheimer, R.; Palmer, D. W.; Patel, R.; Perrin, M. D.; Poyneer, L. A.; Rafikov, R. R.; Rantakyrö, F. T.; Rice, E. L.; Rojo, P.; Rudy, A. R.; Ruffio, J.-B.; Ruiz, M. T.; Sadakuni, N.; Saddlemyer, L.; Salama, M.; Savransky, D.; Schneider, A. C.; Sivaramakrishnan, A.; Song, I.; Soummer, R.; Thomas, S.; Vasisht, G.; Wallace, J. K.; Ward-Duong, K.; Wiktorowicz, S. J.; Wolff, S. G.; Zuckerman, B. (2015). "Discovery and spectroscopy of the young jovian planet 51 Eri b with the Gemini Planet Imager". Science. 350 (6256): 64–67. arXiv:1508.03084. Bibcode:2015Sci...350...64M. doi:10.1126/science.aac5891. PMID 26272904.
