= Thomas Larkin =

Thomas Larkin may refer to:

- Thomas Larkin (ice hockey) (born 1990), British-born Italian ice hockey player
- Thomas B. Larkin (1890–1968), American military officer
- Thomas O. Larkin (1802–1858), early American emigrant to Mexico and a signer of the original California Constitution
- Tom Larkin (diplomat) (1917–2021), New Zealand public servant and diplomat
- Tom Larkin (hurler) (1931–2020), Irish hurler and Gaelic footballer
- Tom Larkin (musician) (born 1971), member of the New Zealand band Shihad

== See also ==
- Tommy Larkins, drummer with Jonathan Richman
