= Hubert Larken =

The Ven. Hubert Larken (15 March 1874 – 6 April 1964) was an Anglican priest, who served as Archdeacon of Lincoln from 1933 to 1937.

Larken was born in Lincoln, Lincolnshire, the son of Eliza Larken and Francis Roper Larken. He was the grandson of Edmund Larken and elder brother of Vice-Admiral Sir Frank Larken.

He was educated at Charterhouse and Magdalen College, Oxford; and ordained in 1899. He was: Curate of Gainsborough until 1900 and then held incumbencies at Cherry Willingham, Nettleham, Cowbit, Cleethorpes, Brocklesby, Theddlethorpe, Croyland Abbey, Ashby de la Launde, Honington and Wilsford.

Church of England titles
Preceded by John Edward Hine	Archdeacon of Lincoln; 1933–1937	Succeeded by Kenneth Charles Harman Warner
