= Edmund Larken =

Edmund Roberts Larken (1809–1895) was an English cleric and Christian socialist, a patron of radical causes and author on social matters. Along with other unconventional views, he was noted as possibly the first parish priest of his time to wear a beard.

== Life ==
Larken's father, Edmund Larken (1766–1831), worked for the East India Company. His sister Eliza married William Monson, 6th Baron Monson; his brother Arthur Staunton Larken (1816–1889), the third son, was known as an officer of arms, becoming Portcullis Pursuivant and then Richmond Herald.

Larken matriculated at Trinity College, Oxford in 1829, graduating B.A. in 1833, and M.A. in 1836. He was ordained deacon in 1833, and priest in 1834. At Oxford he considered himself a follower of Richard Whateley. He became rector of Burton by Lincoln, remaining there from 1843 to 1895; he was presented to the living by his brother-in-law Lord Monson. In an invasion scare in 1859, a Lincolnshire rifle corps was raised and Larken was chaplain in it. An unsuccessful campaign was mounted for him to become Dean of Lincoln in 1860.

== Interests ==
Larken was interested in the socialist ideas of Charles Fourier, including an account of them with one of his sermons in 1842. He collaborated with John Minter Morgan on schemes for village settlement. In 1847 he became chairman of a building society, of which George Boole was a director. Larken and Boole also worked together in the 1850s on a plan to reduce the impact of prostitution in Lincoln. Other involvements were with the Leeds Redemption Society and a co-operative flour mill.

Larken worked with Matilda Mary Hays and Elizabeth Ann Ashurst on a project to translate George Sand's works into English. It came to an end in 1847 due to lack of support. He joined the Social Reform League in 1850 and the Association for the Repeal of the Taxes on Knowledge in 1851. He associated with the radicals of his time, and backed The Leader financially. At his house Thomas Archer Hirst encountered George Holyoake.

== Works ==
- Sermons on the Commandments (1837)
- A sermon preached at Horbling, Lincolnshire, in obedience to the Queen's letter in behalf of the distressed manufacturers, on Sunday, July 24, 1842. With an appendix containing a sketch of the industrial system of Fourier (1842)
- The necessity of toleration to the exercise of private judgment, a sermon (1847)
- The Miller of Angibault (1847), translated from George Sand, edited by Matilda Hays.

== Family ==
Larken's eldest son was a medical doctor in the Indian Army, dying at age 26. The third son (born 1844) was Francis Roper, who was the father of Vice-Admiral Sir Frank Larken and Hubert Larken, the Archdeacon of Lincoln. Other children included daughters Annie Frances and Henrietta.
