= Clearwater Mountains =

Mountain range in Idaho, United States

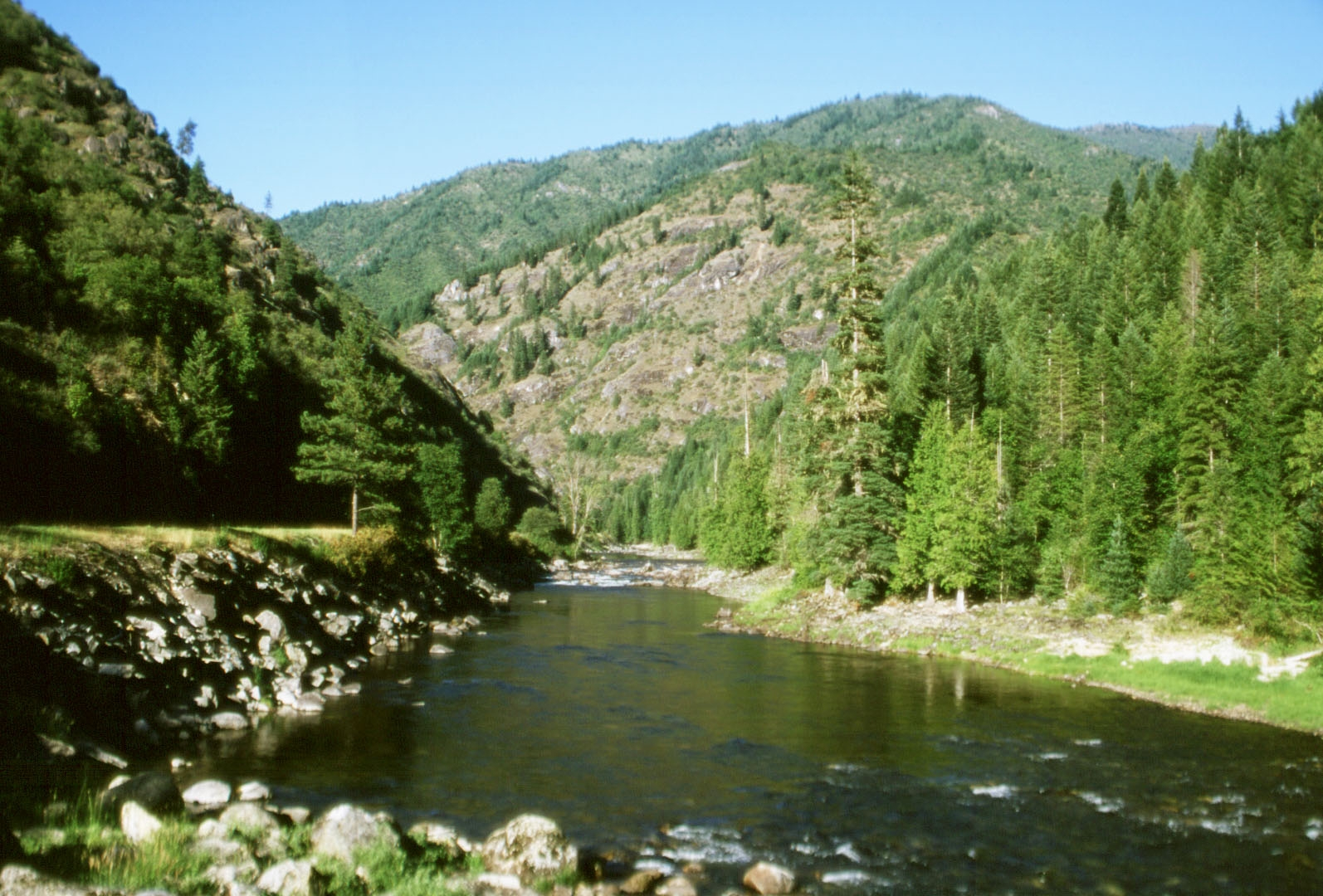
- Scenic view of the Lochsa River in the Clearwater Forest of Idaho (United States)

Highest point
- Peak: Stripe Mountain
- Elevation: 9,001 ft (2,744 m)
- Coordinates: 45°30′48.07″N 114°46′27.26″W

Dimensions
- Length: 134 mi (216 km) N/S
- Width: 106 mi (171 km) E/W
- Area: 8,499 mi^{2} (22,010 km^{2})

Geography
- Location within Idaho
- Country: United States
- State: Idaho
- County: Idaho
- Range coordinates: 45°36′02″N 115°11′03″W
- Topo map: Hida Point

The Clearwater Mountains are part of the Rocky Mountains, located in the panhandle of Idaho in the Western United States. The mountains lie between the Salmon River and the Bitterroot Range and encompass an area of 8,499 square miles (22,012 km^{2}).

== Subranges ==
=== North Clearwater Mountains ===
The North Clearwater Mountains is the northernmost and shortest subrange. The subrange is 4,321 square miles (11,191 km^{2}) in area. Only two of its peaks — the 7,139-foot (2,176 m) Pot Mountain and the 7,077-foot (2,157 m) Black Mountain — rise above 7,000 feet (2,100 m).

=== Selway Crags ===
The Selway Crags lie between the North and South Clearwaters both in latitude and mean elevation. The Selway Crags encompass 885 square miles (2,292 km^{2}) and its two highest peaks are the 8,282-foot (2,524 m) Grave Peak and the 7,424-foot (2,263 m) McConnell Mountain.

=== South Clearwater Mountains ===
The South Clearwater Mountains is the southernmost and tallest subrange, with 6 peaks above 8,000 feet (2,400 m). The South Clearwaters encompass 3,292 square miles (8,526 km^{2}) and its two highest peaks are the 9,001-foot (2,744 m) Stripe Mountain and the 8,943-foot (2,726 m) Salmon Mountain.
