= Christopher Larkin =

Christopher or Chris Larkin may refer to:

- Chris Larkin (born 1967), English actor
- Christopher Larkin (actor) (born 1987), American actor
- Christopher Larkin (composer), Australian composer for video games, film, and television
- Christopher Larkin (conductor), American conductor
- Christopher Larkin, stage name of Purusha Larkin
