= Clontuskert Abbey =

Medieval Augustinian priory in County Galway, Ireland

The Priory Church of Saint Mary, Clontuskert
- Prióireacht Naomh Mhuire, Cluain Tuaiscirt Uí Maine
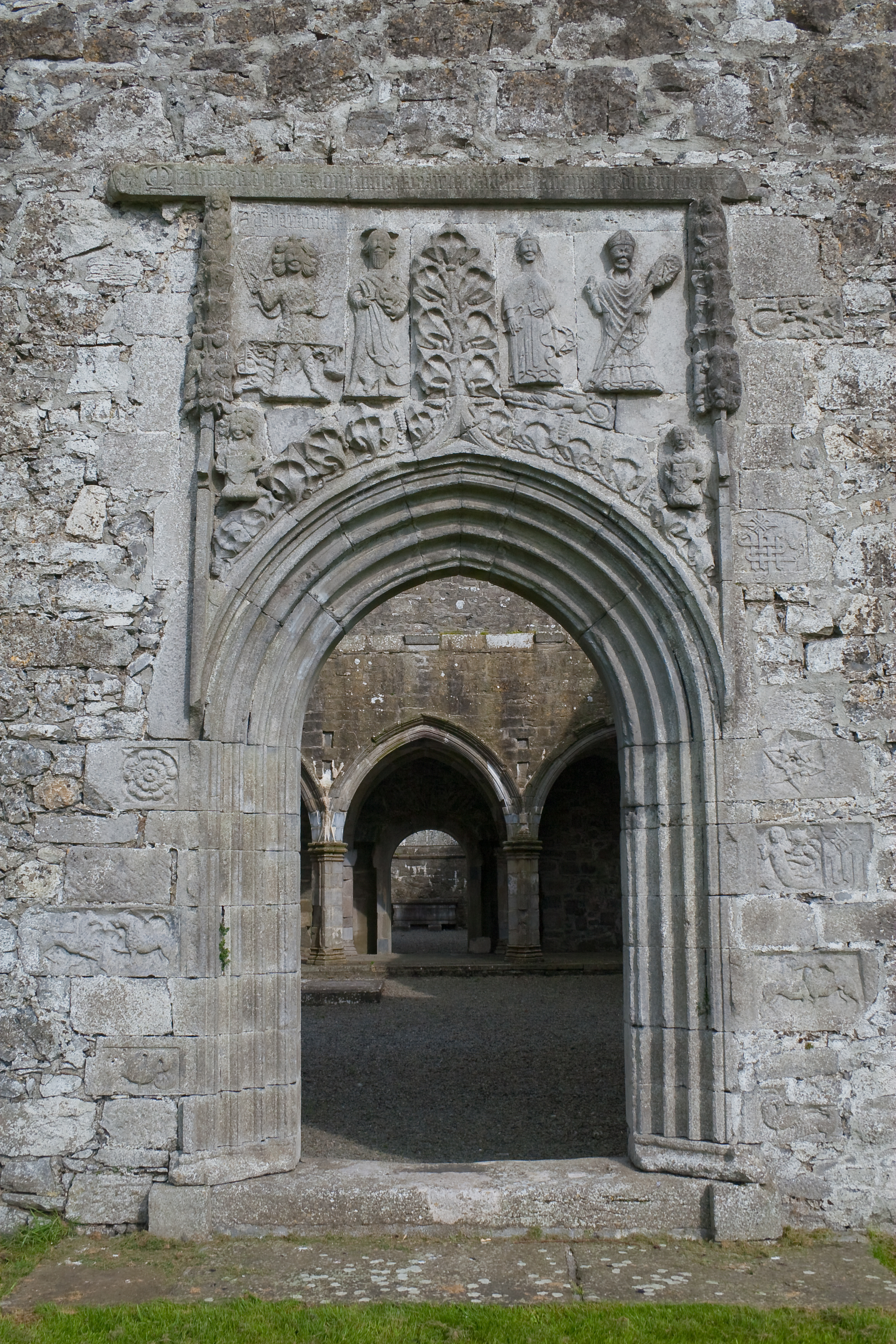
- nave doorway with carved saints

- Location within Ireland
- Interactive map of The Priory Church of Saint Mary, Clontuskert

Monastery information
- Other names: The Old Abbey; Cluain-tuaiskirt-ua-maine; Clontuskert-Omanny
- Order: Arroasian Order
- Established: c. 800; 1180
- Disestablished: 1550s; 1630
- Diocese: Clonfert

People
- Founder: Báedán

Architecture
- Status: ruined
- Style: Late Gothic

Site
- Location: Abbeypark, Ballinasloe, County Galway
- Coordinates: 53.282663°N 8.215720°W
- Visible remains: abbey church, cloister
- Public access: yes

The Priory of Saint Mary, Clontuskert-Hy-Many, also called Clontuskert Abbey, is a medieval Augustinian priory and National Monument located in County Galway, Ireland.

== Location ==
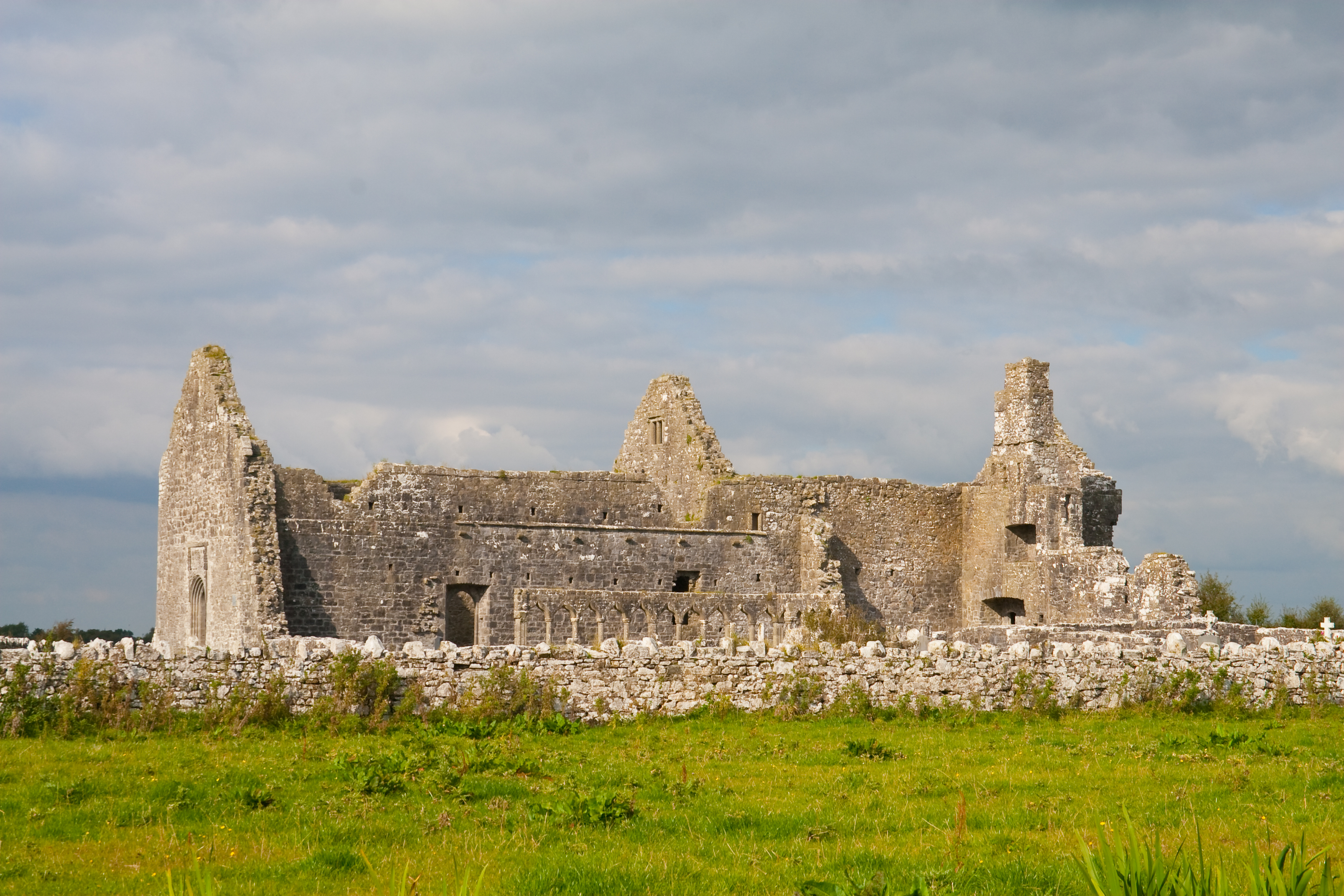
View of the overall complex

Clontuskert Abbey is located 5 kilometres (3.1 mi) south of Ballinasloe, south of the Ballinure River (a tributary of the Suck).

== History ==
This was an early monastic site, founded c. AD 800 by Saint Boedan (Baedán, Baetan) and then located in the kingdom of Uí Maine. It should not be confused with Cloontuskert, located near Lanesborough and founded by Faithleach in the 6th century. Local tradition also states that Boedan's monastery was located not here, but at the ringfort at Chapelpark.

The Priory of St Mary, a priory of the Canons Regular, was founded for the Arroasian Order by the Ó Ceallaigh family c. 1180. It was built in the claustral plan in which the church and domestic buildings are arranged around a central cloister garth.

Clontuskert appears in the Calendar of Papal Petitions for 1379, where "Nicholas O’Quinaeych, Augustinian Canon of St. Mary’s Cluyctenagentomany [Clontuskert-Hy-Many]" was given a dispensation by Pope Urban VI to become prior of the monastery.

It burned down in 1404. It was soon rebuilt, with ten-year indulgences granted to those who paid for the reconstruction. This included the great four-order west doorway, erected 1471. The O'Kellys continued to influence appointment of the prior. In 1444, prior Breasal O'Kelly died in battle. In 1473, prior Donatus O'Kelly was accused of homicide and keeping a concubine.

Clontuskert was dissolved in 1562 and the land passed to the Burkes, although some monks remained until some time after 1637.

The east gable wall collapsed in 1918, but was rebuilt in 1972. Excavation took place in 1970–72.

== Buildings ==
The buildings feature nave, chancel, rood screen, transepts, cloister, chapter room, sacristy, cellars, an oven and a vaulted room in the southeast.

The great west doorway features many carvings, including Michael the Archangel with a sword and the scales for weighing souls; Saints Augustine of Hippo standing on a serpent, Catherine of Alexandria and John the Baptist; a pelican feeding her young; a pair of griffins; and a mermaid with a mirror. The mermaid is similar to one at Clonfert Cathedral, while the doorway is similar to the one at Clonmacnoise. The inscription reads MATHEV DEI GRA EPS CLONFERTENS ET PATRE ONEACDAVAYN CANONIE ESTI DOMINE FI FECERT ANO DO MCCCCLXXI (Matthew by the Grace of God, Bishop of Clonfert, and Patrick O’Naughton, canon of this house, caused me to be made in 1471); the bishop referred to is Matthaeus Mág Raith, the only Augustinian to hold the see of Clonfert.

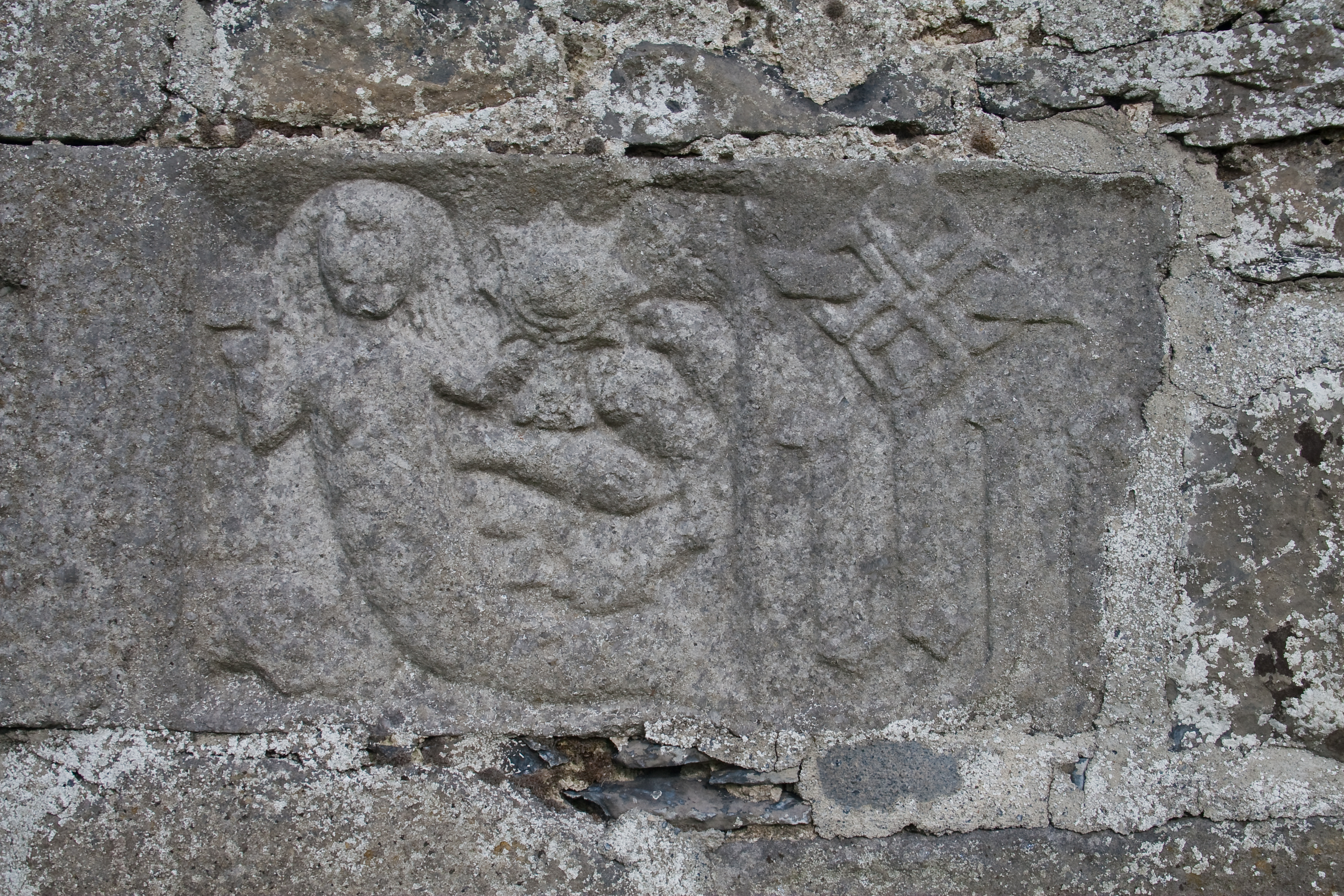
Mermaid carving

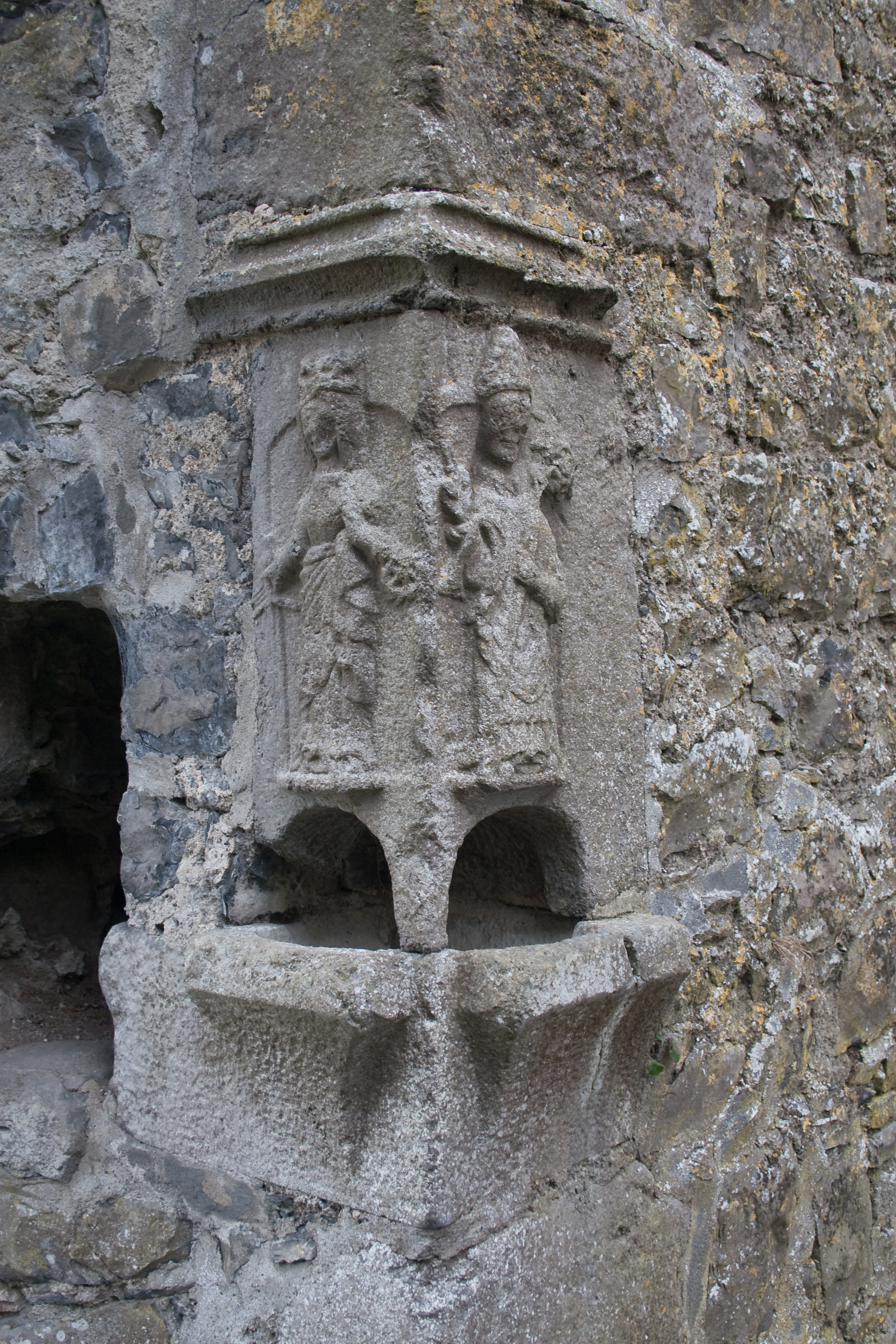
Stoup with Saint Catherine of Alexandria (note wheel) and Augustine of Hippo

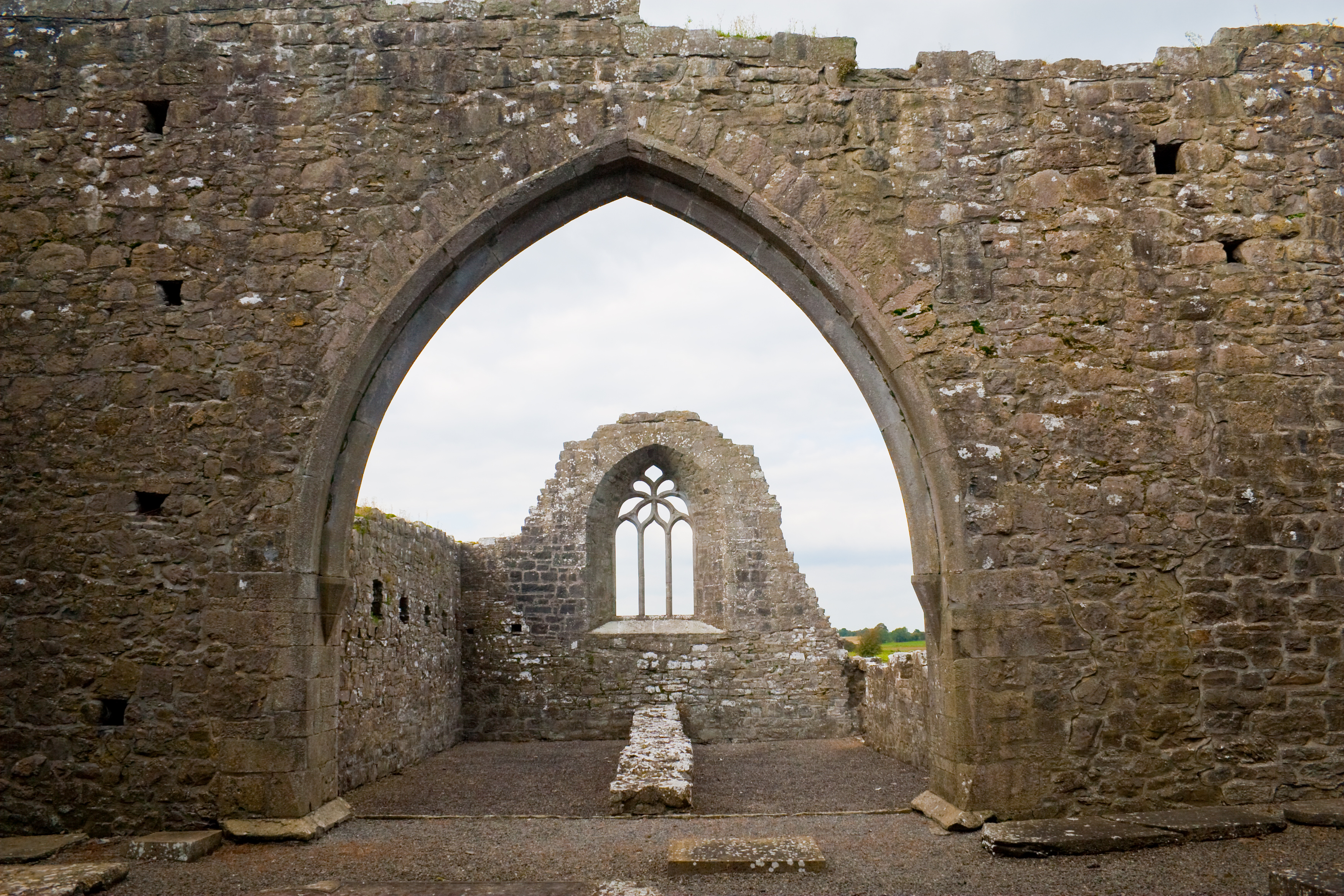
North transept

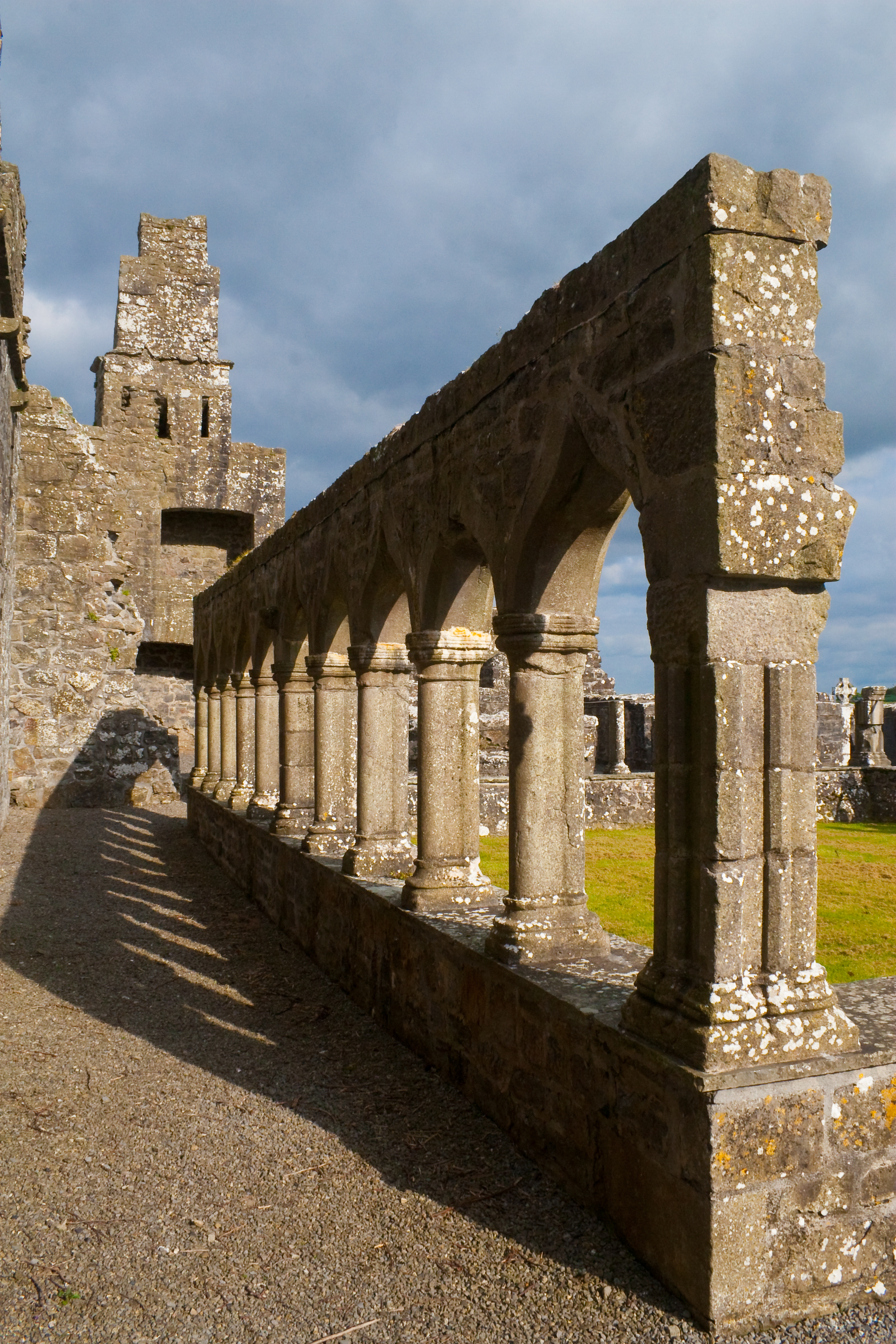
Cloister arcade

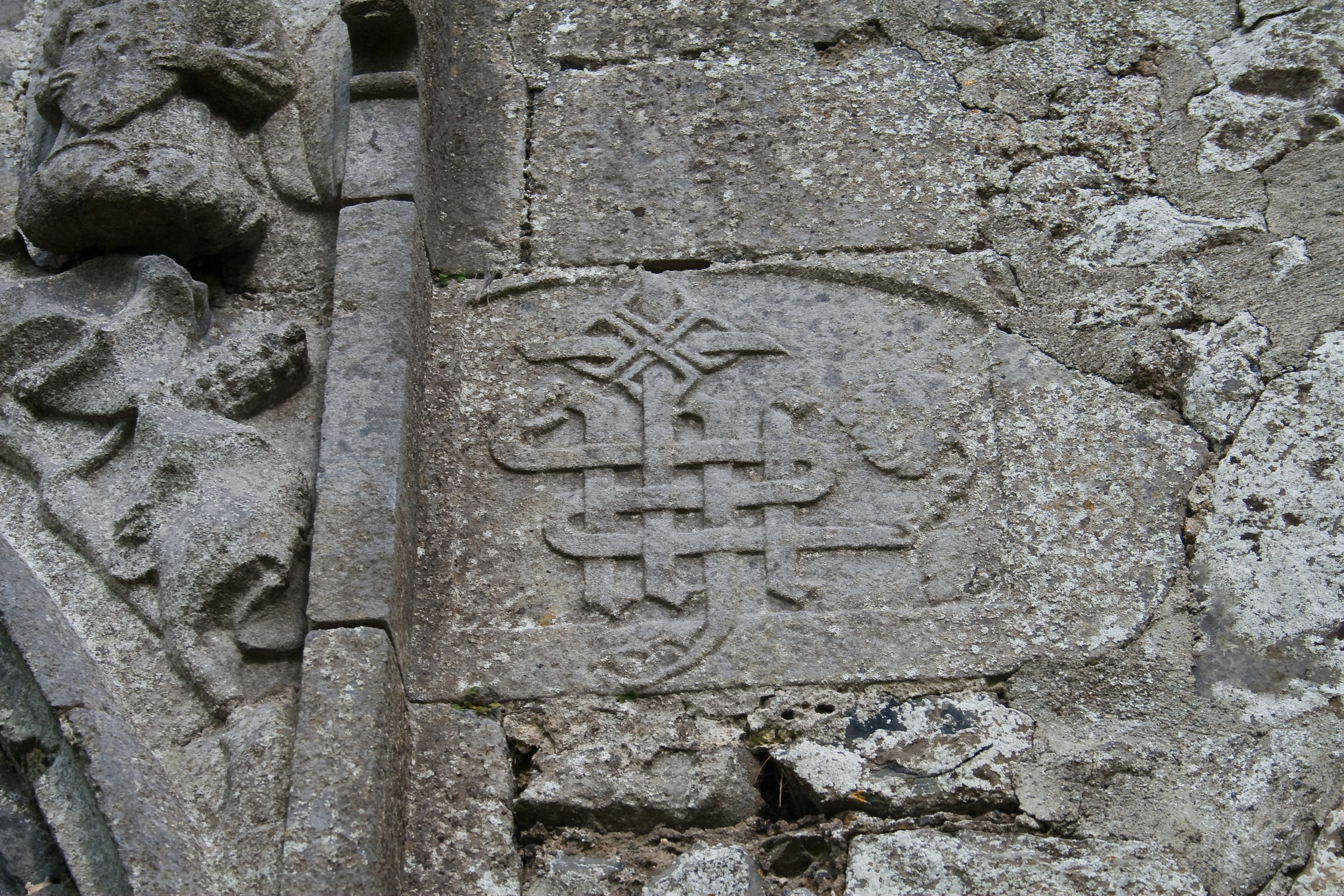
IHC monogram

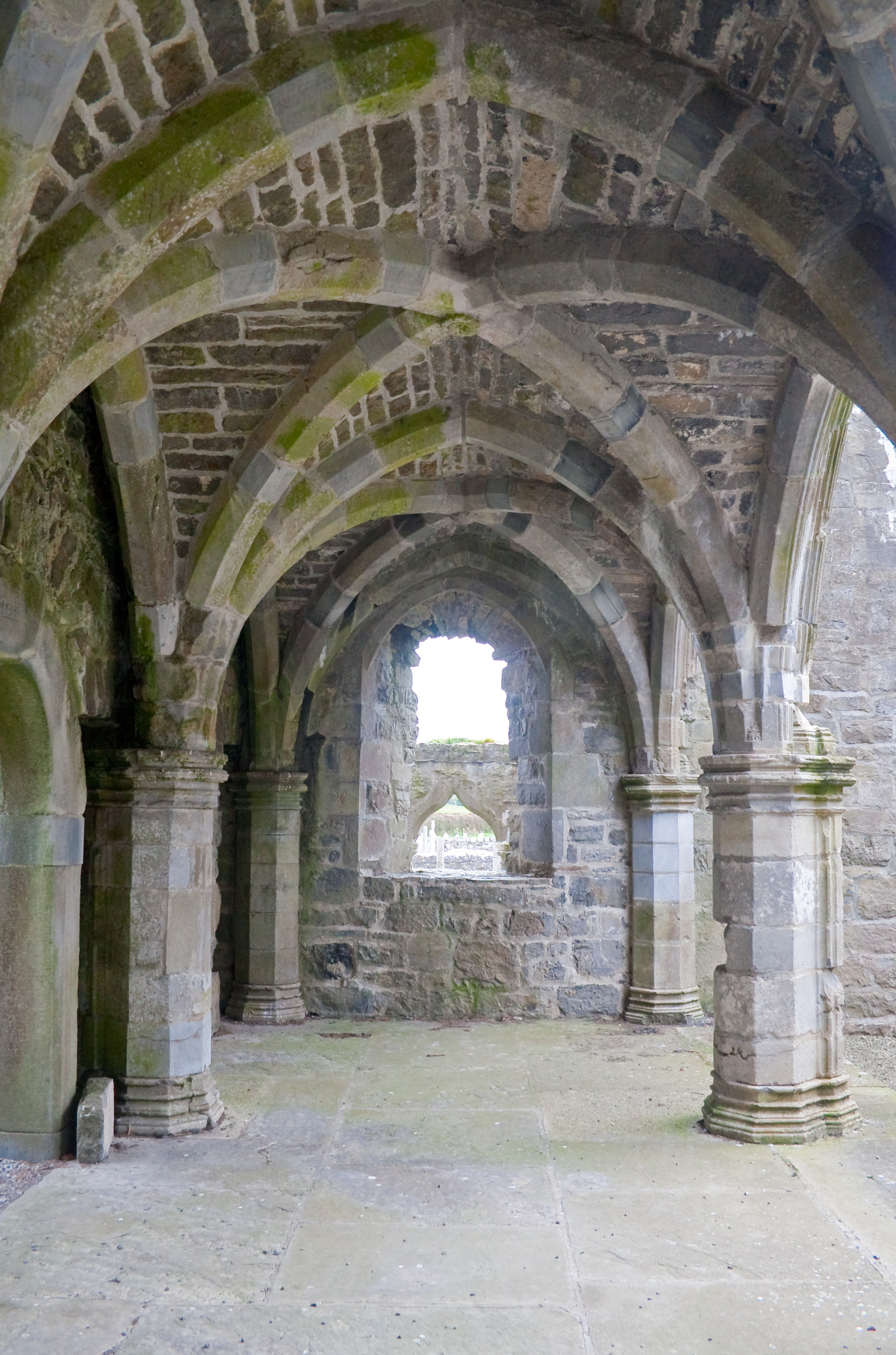
Vaulted rood gallery

== In fiction ==
Clontuskert Abbey is mentioned in Mary Pat Kelly's novel Galway Bay (2011). This abbey is mentioned as well in Lina Callejon’s novel "Ien Seu: El Camino" (Editorial Círculo Rojo)
