= Senator Larkin =

Senator Larkin may refer to:

- Charles H. Larkin (1810–1894), Wisconsin State Senate
- Edward P. Larkin (1915–1986), New York State Senate
- William J. Larkin Jr. (1928–2019), New York State Senate

== See also ==
- John Davis Larkins Jr. (1909–1990), North Carolina State Senate
