= William Larkin =

William Larkin may refer to:

- William Larkin (painter) (died 1619), English painter
- William J. Larkin Jr. (1928–2019), American politician
- William John Larkin (died 1885), New Zealand priest, Irish nationalist and newspaper proprietor
- William Thomas Larkin (1923–2006), American Roman Catholic bishop
- Billy Stiles or William Larkin (1871–1908), American outlaw in the Old West
