= Larkin Smith (disambiguation) =

Larkin Smith may refer to:

- John Larkin (actor, born 1877), birth name John Larkin Smith, American actor
- Larkin I. Smith (1944–1989), Mississippi politician
- Larkin Smith (Virginia politician) (1745–1813)
