= Frank Larken =

Royal Navy Admiral (1875–1953)

Admiral Sir Frank Larken KCB CMG
- Born: 15 November 1875; Lincoln, Lincolnshire
- Died: 21 January 1953 (aged 77); Wandsworth, London
- Military career
- Allegiance: United Kingdom
- Branch: Royal Navy
- Service years: 1889–1933
- Rank: Admiral
- Commands: HMS Doris; HMS Valiant
- Conflicts: World War I
- Awards: Knight Commander of the Order of the Bath; Companion of the Order of St Michael and St George

Admiral Sir Frank Larken KCB CMG (15 November 1875 – 21 January 1953) was a Royal Navy officer who became Naval Secretary.

== Early life and education ==
Larken was born in Lincoln, Lincolnshire, the middle son of Eliza Larken and solicitor Francis Roper Larken. He was the grandson of Edmund Larken and brother of Hubert Larken, Archdeacon of Lincoln.

In 1889, he entered HMS Britannia as a naval cadet. His desire to go to sea was encouraged by early experience boating with his brothers on Foss Dyke, he told a crowd in 1935: "I do not know that I showed any more aptitude for the sea then than they did, but one day, in a fishing boat at Filey, anchored off the Brig in a nasty swell with a cross tide, they were both very sick a good half-hour before I was. Encouraged by that, the prospect of brass buttons and the fact that midshipman received a salary, which afterwards turned out to mainly illusory, I welcomed the suggestion of my parents that 1 should follow a sea life."

== Naval career ==
Larken served in World War I and, as Captain of the cruiser HMS Doris, he led a successful raid cutting the railway line between Adana and Alexandretta in December 1914 thereby impeding the progress of the Turkish invasion of North Africa.

Engineer Graeme Haldane recalled Larken's tremendous leadership aboard the Doris:

Those who had the privilege of serving under the late Frank Larken in H.M.S. Doris during the first world war will recollect how swiftly he raised the fighting efficiency of a heterogeneous ship's company consisting largely of reservists mobilized just before the outbreak of war. To a young cadet fresh from Dartmouth the commissioning process was little short of a nightmare, yet Captain Larken (as he then was) created order out of chaos in a surprisingly short space of time. and it was a fighting ship that reached the Mediterranean a few months later. Captain Larken was interested in every man of his ship's company and inspired a very real sense of affection as well as respect. Perhaps this was particularly so in the gun room, consisting as it did of inexperienced cadets to whom the harshness of the sudden plunge into war service was in no small measure mitigated by Captain Larken's interest and consideration.

— T. G. N. Haldane, The Times, 27 January 1953

He also saw action at Gallipoli in 1915.

After the War, he was made Captain of the Fleet, Mediterranean Fleet before being given command of the battleship HMS Valiant. Following his promotion to rear admiral, he became Naval Secretary in 1925 and Commander of the 2nd Cruiser Squadron in 1927, and, following his promotion to vice admiral in 1929, he went on to command the Reserve Fleet in 1930. He was promoted to full admiral on 1 September 1933, before retiring later the same month.

He was made CB in the 1925 New Year Honours and advanced to KCB in the 1932 Birthday Honours.

== Personal life ==
In 1909, he married Victoria Alexandrina Rawson, the daughter of Commander Wyatt Rawson. They had two sons and two daughters. Their son Francis became a Royal Navy captain and Deputy Director of Naval Ordnance at the Admiralty. Their son Nigel was killed in action in 1941 aboard HMS Dolphin.

Military offices
Preceded by Hubert Brand	Naval Secretary; 1925–1927	Succeeded by Eric Fullerton
Preceded by Percival Hall-Thompson	Commander-in-Chief, Reserve Fleet; 1930–1932	Succeeded by Sir William Kerr
