= Portumna Abbey =

Ruined medieval friary in Galway, Ireland

- Mainistir Phort Omna
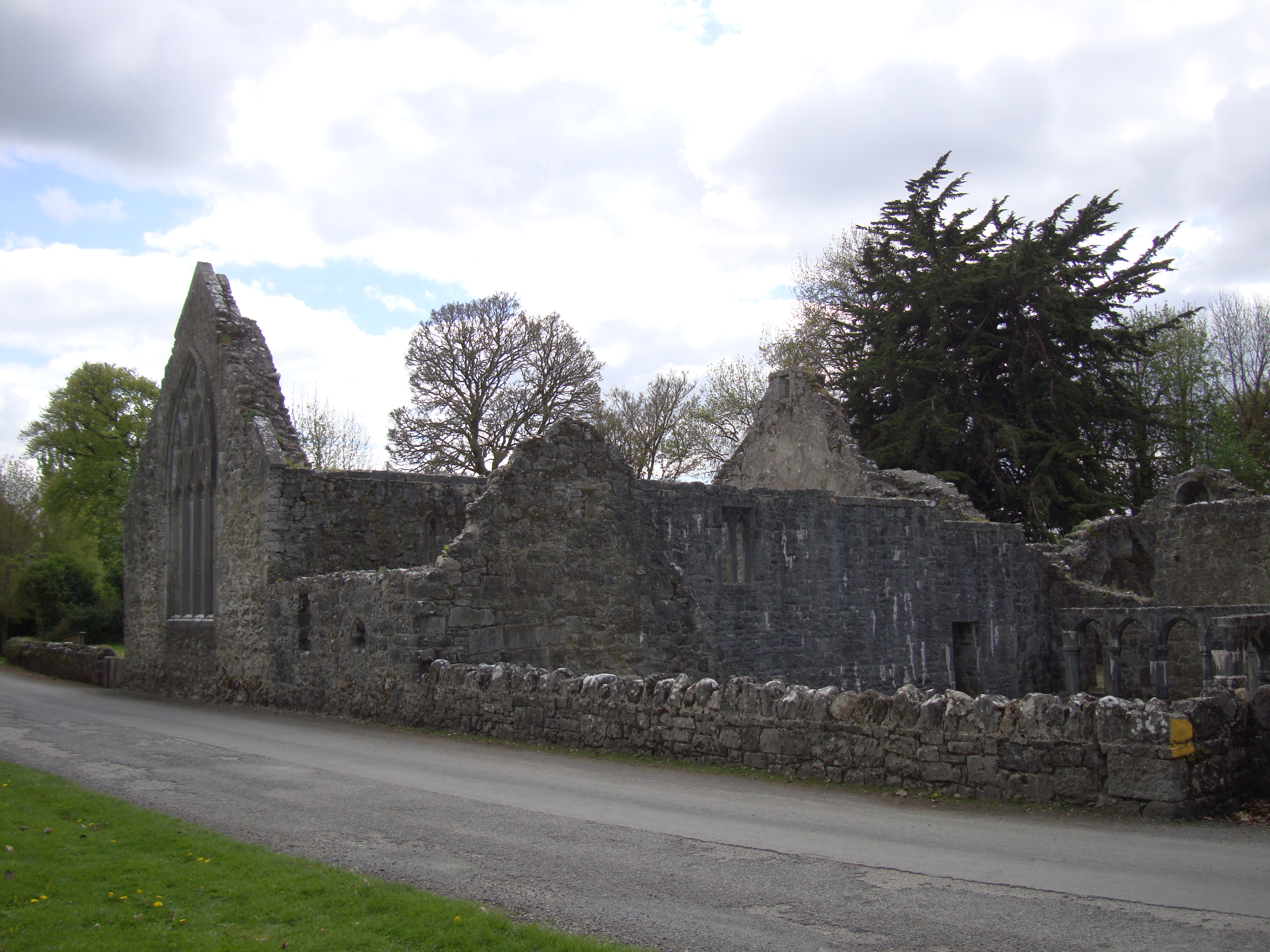
- Ruins of the abbey church

- Location within Ireland
- Interactive map of Portumna Abbey

Monastery information
- Other names: Portomna; Portompria
- Order: Cistercian Order (1254–1414?); Dominican Order (1426–1711)
- Established: 1254; refounded 1426, 1640
- Disestablished: c. 1582, 1698, 1711
- Mother house: Dunbrody Abbey (Cistercian era)
- Diocese: Clonfert

People
- Founder: Murchad Ó Madáin (1426)
- Important associated figures: Ambrose Ó Madadhan; Richard Ó Madadhan; Anthony McHugo; Ulick Burke, 3rd Earl of Clanricarde; Patrick Sarsfield, 1st Earl of Lucan

Architecture
- Status: Inactive
- Style: Late Gothic

Site
- Location: Portumna Demesne, Portumna, County Galway
- Coordinates: 53.086087°N 8.217617°W
- Visible remains: abbey church, cloister
- Public access: yes

Portumna Abbey is a medieval Cistercian (and later Dominican) friary and National Monument located in Portumna, Ireland.

== Location ==
Portumna Abbey is located 500 metres (550 yd) south of Portumna town centre, immediately east of Portumna Castle and on the north edge of Lough Derg.

== History ==
A chapel dedicated to Saints Peter and Paul was founded by Cistercian monks in 1254, dependent on Dunbrody Abbey, County Wexford.

The Cistercian foundation declined and was replaced with a Dominican friary dedicated to Saint Mary Assumed into Heaven, Peter and Paul, founded in 1426 by Murchad Ó Madáin of the powerful O'Madden lords of Síol Anmchadha.

Portumna was dissolved c. 1582 and granted to Ulick Burke, 3rd Earl of Clanricarde.

The friary was reestablished in 1640, with Ambrose Ó Madadhan the first prior. Richard Ó Madadhan was prior in 1691, when the friars were forced to flee after the Battle of Aughrim. Anthony McHugo was the prior when the Dominicans were formally expelled on 1 May 1698. Some remained and by the early 18th century they had reoccupied the priory. McHugo died there on 24 July 1711. The friars continued to live in the area, at Boula and at Gortanumera up to the 19th century.

Part of the monastery was used as a Church of Ireland church in 1631. Patrick Sarsfield, 1st Earl of Lucan married Honora Burke here on 9 January 1689, in the midst of the War of the Two Kings.

The choir was the local Church of Ireland place of worship between 1762 and 1810.

== Buildings ==
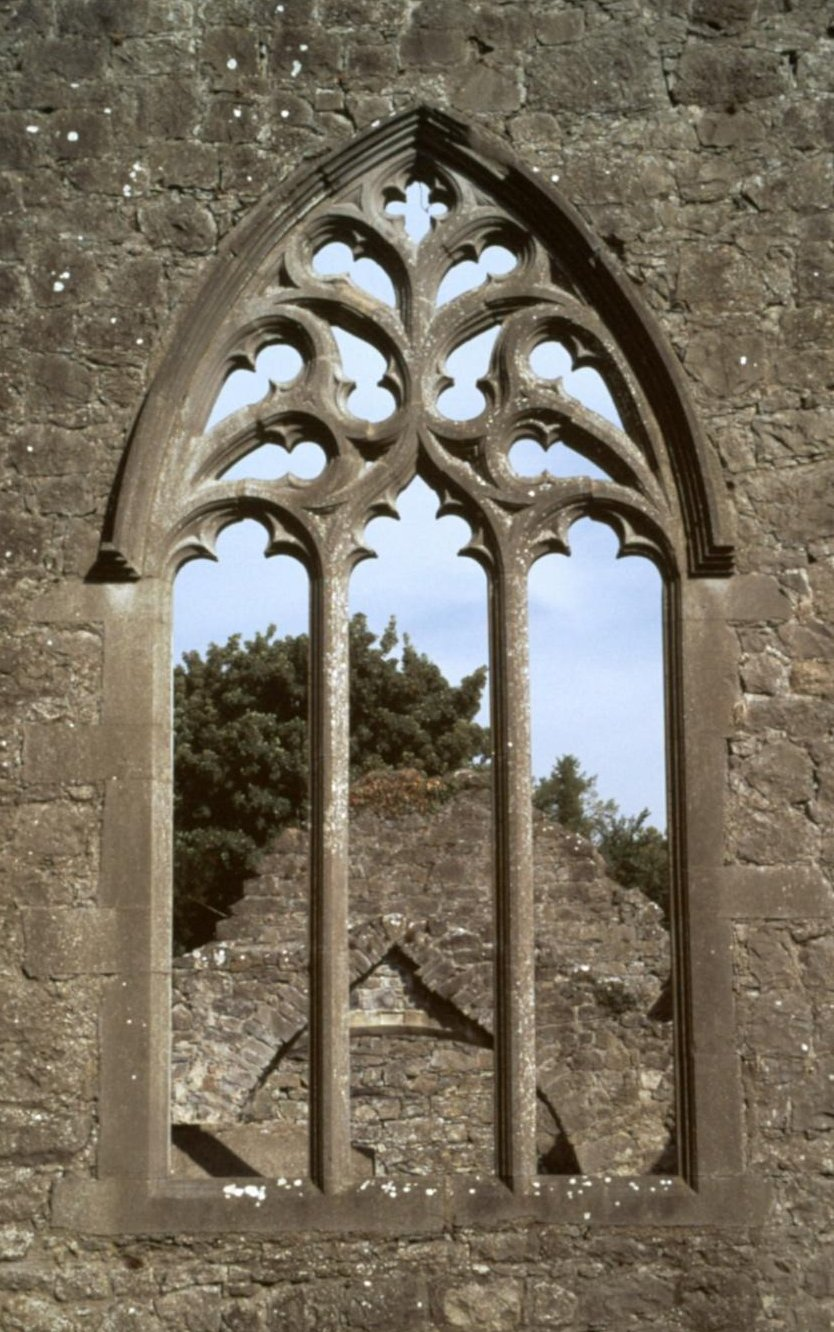
The east window with intricate tracery

The church is 35 m (115 ft) long with nave and chancel separated by a tower. There is a large collection of medieval graveslabs and memorial plaques, and a piscinal.

On the northern side is a cloister and sacristy, with some of the arcade reconstructed.
