= Patrick Larkin (politician) =

Irish businessman and politician (1829–1900)

Patrick Joseph Larkin (March 1, 1829 – August 31, 1900) was a Canadian ship's captain, businessman and politician.

Patrick Joseph Larkin was one of eight children who emigrated with their parents to Quebec, Canada, in 1837. His father died while on the ship, and his mother led the family to Toronto. By 1842 Larkin had gone to sea, eventually becoming a captain, a ship owner, and was involved in ship construction.

From the 1870s he served as a municipal councillor in St. Catharines, Ontario, becoming mayor of the city from 1882 to 1883.

In 1875, he formed the contracting firm, Larkin, Connolly, and Connolly, its first contract being to build a section of the Welland canal. The company owned a dock, a harbour works, and portions of a railway.

Larkin invested in the grocery business and supplied timer. The Dictionary of Canadian Biography says of him

Larkin was the last of St Catharines's "Big Four," the others being James Murray, Sylvester Neelon, and James Norris. Survived by his wife, five daughters, and a son, he left an estate valued at about $245,655, which included a livery stable and hotel in St Catharines, land in Spallumcheen, B.C., and his interest ($57,359) in the Iroquois contract.
