= Tim Larkin (self-defense) =

Tim Larkin is an American self-defense "expert," founder of Target Focus Training, and author of the New York Times bestselling book Surviving The Unthinkable.

== Target Focus Training ==
Larkin is the founder and creator of Target Focus Training (TFT). Larkin's training is focused on teaching concepts and principles of manipulating the body to quickly and effectively induce injury in an asocial violent situation where an assailant is determined to cause harm or death to his victims. Larkin teaches his students to recognize when they can avoid violence, and when to use it if facing imminent, life-threatening danger. Since formation, Target Focus Training has instructed over 10,000 clients in more than 40 countries.

== Books ==
=== How to Survive the Most Critical 5 Seconds of Your Life ===
In 2009, Larkin co-authored the book How to Survive the Most Critical 5 Seconds of Your Life with Chris Ranck-Buhr. The book was included in Glenn Beck's recommended book list.

=== Surviving The Unthinkable ===
In 2013 Rodale Books published Larkin's book Survive the Unthinkable: A Total Guide to Women's Self-Protection. Tony Robbins wrote the foreword to the book.

The book attempts to teach readers to identify the difference between social aggression (which can be avoided) and asocial violence (which is unavoidable), recognize personal behaviors that may jeopardize safety, and target highly specific areas on an attacker's body for a strategic counterattack.

The book debuted at #4 on the New York Times bestseller list, as well as on the USA Today bestseller list.

== Reception ==
In 2011, Black Belt Magazine named Larkin their "Self-Defense Instructor of the Year".

In May 2012, Larkin was banned from entering the United Kingdom by British interior minister Theresa May due to his methods of training. The controversial decision was covered by a variety of news outlets including NBC News, BBC News, The Telegraph, The Independent, The Huffington Post, and others.
