= Patrick Larkin (hurler) =

Irish hurler

Personal information
- Native name: Pádraig Ó Lorcáin (Irish)
- Born: 1866 Killimor, County Galway, Ireland
- Died: 1917 (aged 51) Kiltormer, County Galway, Ireland
- Occupations: Shopkeeper and farmer

Sport
- Sport: Hurling
- Position: Goalkeeper
Club
- Years: Club
- Kiltormer
Inter-county
- Years: County
- 1887: Galway
Inter-county titles
- All-Irelands: 0

Patrick Larkin (1866–1917) was an Irish hurler who played as a goalkeeper for the Galway senior team.

Born in Killimor, County Galway, Larkin first played competitive hurling as a teenager. He made his first impression on the hurling field at the age of seventeen when he organised various hurling games, drawn up under his own rules, in south-east Galway. Larkin captained Galway in the inaugural championship in 1887, however, he ended his inter-county career without an All-Ireland medal.

As well as hurling at inter-county level, Larkin subsequently served as president and secretary of the Galway County Board.

Larkin was also involved in the Land War struggles, as well as being identified with the physical force men of the oath-bound Irish Republican Brotherhood, and was imprisoned for his agrarian activities.

Sporting positions
Preceded by	Galway Senior Hurling Captain; 1887	Succeeded by
