= Fearghal mac Catharnach =

Fearghal mac Catharnach (died 821/823) was Lord of Loch Riach.

Fearghal was ruler of Loch Riach in what is now County Galway. He appears to have been a son of Cathrannach mac Cathal, described as of Máenmag in the Annals of Ulster upon his death in 801.

His obit occurs twice in the Irish annals, sub anno 821 and 823.

Loch Riach is a lake at the foot of the Sliabh Eachtaí, located in a territory then called Máenmag; its ruling dynasty were the Ui Fiachrach Finn.

In 802, The demolition of Loch Riach was undertaken by King Muirgius mac Tommaltaig of Connacht.

A later lord of Loch Riach was Cormac mac Ceithearnach (died 881).

The town of Loughrea takes its name from Loch Riach.
