= Báetán moccu Chormaic =

Irish abbot

Báetán moccu Chormaic, abbot of Clonmacnoise, died 1 March 664.

Báetán was a member of the Moccu Chormaic, a prominent line of the Conmaicne Mara (now Connemara). In 653 he became ninth abbot of Clonmacnoise in succession to Aedlug mac Caman. He held office for twelve years, a considerable period considering most candidates were elderly.

He may have been an exegetical scholar. Michael Richter argues that he was a teacher of the Irish "Augustine" (died 665), identifying him with the Bathanus named by Augustine in his De mirabilibus sacrae scripturae.

He was included in the martyrologies, which implies he was considered, at least by some, to be a man of saintly character. He was succeeded by Colmán Cass mac Fualascaig, of the Corcu Moga of what is now north-east County Galway
