= Máenmag =

Early people of Ireland

Máenmag (Modern Irish: Maonmhagh) was originally a sub-kingdom of Uí Mháine, later termed a trícha cét, and in Anglo-Norman times a cantred, which formed what is now the barony of Loughrea.

== Origin ==
It was first under the control of Ui Fiachrach Finn, and later by the Uí Maine. Uí Nechtain (Naughton) and Uí Máelalaid (Mullally, Lally) were listed as its ruling families.

== Territory ==
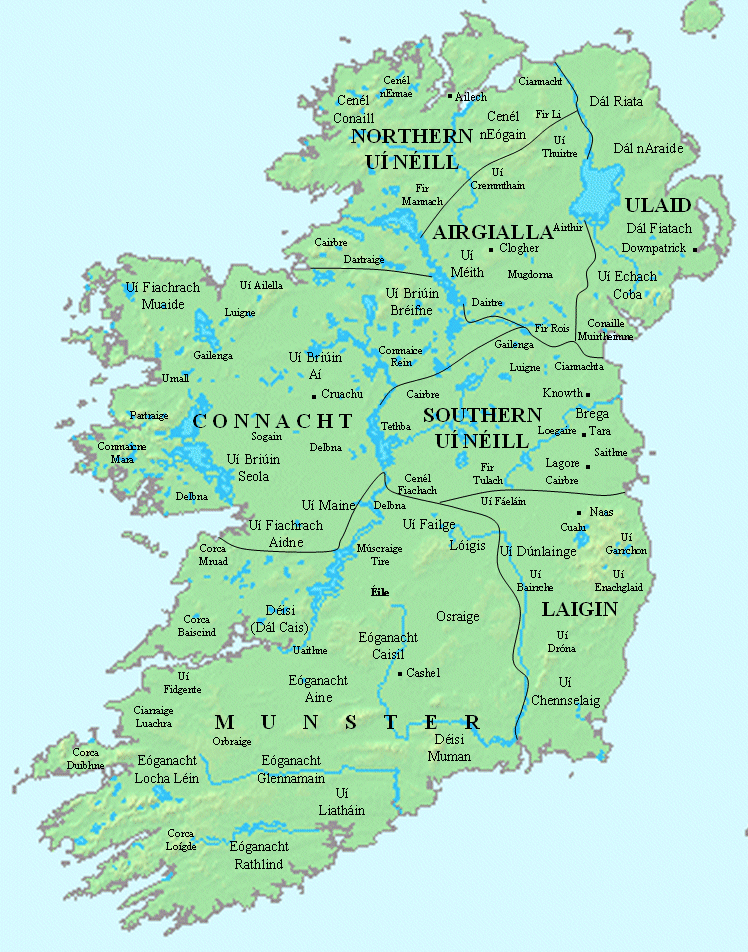
Early peoples and kingdoms of Ireland, c.800

An extent dated 1333 it as including the parishes of Kilconierin, Kiltullagh, Killimordaly, Grange, Killeenadeema, Lickerrig and Loughrea (the later including the parishes of Kilconickny, Kilteskill and Kilcooly). Still more were Killaan, Bullaun, Kilreekil and Kilmeen.

== Notable natives ==
In 581, the Annals of the Four Masters records the death of "Aedh mac Suibhne, toiseach Maonmuighe" (Aedh, son of Suibhne, chief of Máenmag). In 801, the Annals of Ulster records the deaths of Cathrannach mac Cathal of Maenmag, and the anchorite Ninnid. In 803, there was A skirmish between the Soghain and the sept of Maenmag, in which many were slain.

Neide mac Onchu mac Finnlugh was described as the Cú Chulainn of the Conmaicne in an account of the battle of Ardrahan, which took place sometime about 800.

Fearghal mac Catharnach, Lord of Loch Riach, died 821/823.

Cétadach, 31st Abbot of Clonmacnoise (died 848), was a native of Máenmag.

Cormac mac Ceithearnach, ruler and cleric, died 881.

Conchobar Maenmaige Ua Cellaigh, King of Uí Maine (died 1180) and his foster-son, Conchobar Maenmaige Ua Conchobair, King of Connacht (1186-1189) both spent their childhood in Máenmag.

Seán Ó Maolalaidh (fl. 1419–1480) was Chief of the Name and the last Ó Maolalaidh chief to reside in the area.

== Annalistic references ==
From the Chronicon Scotorum:

- 1132 A raid by Conchobor ua Briain into Maenmagh and he plundered Cell Biain and brought away many cows.
- 1135 A Battle at Maengach initiated by the Síl Muiredaigh on the Uí Maine, in which many fell including Conchobor ua Cellaigh and ua Mainnín, king of Sogain. The Ui Maine were victorious.

From the Annals of Loch Ce:

- 1180 The battle of the Conchobars, in Connacht, in which Conchobhar Maenmaighe killed Conchobhar O'Ceallaigh, i.e. the king of Uí-Maine, and his son Tadhg, and Diarmaid O'Ceallaigh, and many nobles of Uí-Maine; at Maghsruibhe-gealain, at the head of Daire-na-capall, this battle was fought.
- 1531 Tuathal, the son of O Domnallain of Machaire Maenmuighe, died. Gilla Patraic son of Adam Mac an Baird died.

== See also ==
- Ui Fiachrach Finn
- Clann Fhergail
- Uí Fiachrach Aidhne
- Clann Taidg
- Conmaicne Mara
- Delbhna Tír Dhá Locha
- Muintir Murchada
- Senchineoil
- Soghain
- Uí Díarmata
- Síol Anmchadha
- Iar Connacht
- Maigh Seola
- Cenél Áeda na hEchtge
