= Aongus Ó Giolláin =

14th century Irish poet

Aongus Ó Giolláin, fl. 14th-century, was an Irish poet.

Ó Giolláin (Gillan) is known as the author of the poem The Dead at Clonmacnoise. His details are unknown, though Ó Giolláin was a surname used by unrelated families in the kingdoms of Connacht and Tír Eogain.

== See also ==
- Clonmacnoise
