= Martan of Clonmacnoise =

Martan of Clonmacnoise, Abbot of Clonmacnoise, died 868.

Martan was a member of the Dartraighe Daimhinsi in what is now County Monaghan, was Abbot of Clonmacnoise and Dairnhinis. He is recorded as being a scribe.
