= Abbot of Clonmacnoise =

The Abbot of Clonmacnoise was the monastic head of Clonmacnoise, a monastery situated in County Offaly in Ireland on the River Shannon south of Athlone. The abbots also bore the title "Comarba of Saint Ciarán", "successor of Saint Ciarán". The following is a list of abbots:

== List of abbots to 1539 ==
Name	Life	Comments
Ciarán mac int Sair	d. 9 September 544 or 548/9	
Óenu moccu Loigse	died 20 January 570	
Mac Nisse	died 13 June 585 or 591	The Annals of Ulster hesitate, suggesting both 585 ("in the 17th year of his abbacy") and 591 as possible dates. Both the Annals of the Four Masters (s.a. 589) and the Annals of Clonmacnoise say that he was abbot for 16 years.
Ailithir	died 599	
To Lua Foto (Lucaill)	died 614	
Columbán moccu Bairddéni (Columbanus filius Bairddaeni)	died 628	
Crónán moccu Loigde	died 18 July 638	
Áedlug mac Cammáin	died 26 February 652	
Báetán moccu Chormaic	died 1 March 664	
Colmán Cass mac Fualascaig	died 665	
Cumméne	died 665	
Colmán	died 683	
Forcrón	died 686	
Crónán Becc (Crón)	died 6 April 694	
Osséne Frémainne mac Galluist,	deposed before 696/7, died 706	
Faílbe Becc	died 713	
Cuindles	died 724	
Fland Fine ua Colla (Fland Cualann)	died 733	
Conmáel ua Lóchéni	died 737	
Cellach mac Ségdai	died 740	
Commán mac Fáelchon	died 26 December 747	
Luccreth (Lucraid)	died 29 April 753	
Cormac ua Cairbre Crom	died 762	From the Sil Cairbre Cruim of the Ui Maine
Rónán	died 764	
Ua Miannaig	died 768	
Folachtach	died 770	Likely from the Ui Chormaic Maenmaige of the Ui Maine
Forbassach ua Cernaig	died 771	
Collbran	died 776	
Rechtnia (Rechtabrae)	died 784	From the Sil Cairbre Cruim of the Ui Maine
Snéidriagail	died 786	
Murgal	died 789	
Sóerbergg	died 791	
Ioseph ua Cernaig	died 794	
Anaile	died 799	
Tuathgal	died 811	Erected the Bealin High Cross which still bears his name in an inscription.
Foirchellach Fobair	died 814	
Suibne mac Cuanach	died 816	
Rónán	resigned 823, died 844	
Cétadach	died 848	From the Sil Cairbre Cruim of the Ui Maine
Condmach	died 868	
Martan of Clonmacnoise	died 869	
Ferdomnach of Clonmacnoise	died 872	
Eógan Topair	died 876	
Máel Tuili ua Cuanach	died 877	
Máel Pátraic	died 885	
Máel Brigte na Gamnaide	died 892	The Annals of Inisfallen read sub anno 891 read "Mael Petair mac Cúán, took Cluain Ferta Brénainn", and in 895 "Repose of Mael Petair mac Cúán, abbot of Tír dá Glas and Cluain Ferta Brénainn."
Blathmac mac Tairchedaig	died 896	The Annals of Inisfallen sub anno 896 read "The martyrdom of Mael Achid, abbot of Cluain Moccu Nois." Perhaps he replaced Blathmac (or vice versa) only to be subsequently killed in a raid on the monastery.
Dedimus ua Foirbthen	deposed 901, died 923	
Ioseph of Lough Con	died 904	
Aed mac Ailill	died 916	
Colmán mac Ailella	died 926	In 922, "Tomrair son of Elgi, a Jarl of the foreigners, on Luimnech (the Lower Shannon), and he proceeded and plundered Inis Celtra and Muicinis, and burned Cluain Moccu Nóis; and he went on Loch Rí and plundered all its islands, and he ravaged Mide."
Máel Giric	died 929	
Tipraite mac Ainnséine	died 931	
Ainmere ua Cathla (ua Cathaláin)	948	
Ferdomnach ua Máenaig	died 952	The Annals of Inisfallen state, sub anno 951, that "A foray by Cellachán and by Donnchadh, and they plundered Cluain Ferta Brénainn and Cluain Moccu Nóis."
Célechair mac Robartaig	died 954	Inisfallen says that he was also abbot of Cluain Iraird.
Cormac ua Cillín	died 966	
Tuathal	died 971	Inisfallen gives his obit under 972 and AFM under 969.
Dúnchad ua Bráein	Went on pilgrimage to Armagh 976, died 16 January 988/9	Annals of Clonmacnoise state he died in 981.
Máel Finnia mac Speláin (ua Máenaig)	died 992	
Ua Beculáin	deposed 1002	
Flannchad ua Ruaidíne (ua Ruadáin)	died 1003	
Flaithbertach mac Domnaill	died 1014	Inisfallen states that Robartach the Anchorite, rested in Cluain Moccu Nois in 1007, during Flaithbertach's term.
Muiredach mac Mugróin	died 1025	
Bressal Conailech	died 1030	
Loingsech ua Flaithnén	1042	
Echtigern Ua hEaghráin	died 1052	
Máel Finnéin mac Cuinn na mBocht	died 1056	
Ailill Ua hAirechtaig	died 1070	
Máel Ciaráin mac Cuinn na mBocht	died 1079	
Tigernach Ua Bráein	died 1088	once held to be the author of the Annals of Tigernach (hence the name), but possibly one of the annalists responsible for the text; was also abbot of Roscommon.
Ailill Ua Nialláin	died 1093	
Mac Raith Ua Flaithnén	resigned 1096, died 1100	
Cormac mac Cuinn na mBocht	died 1103	
Flaithbertach Ua Loingsig	died 1109	
Gilla Críst Ua Máel Eóin	died 1127	
Domnall Ua Dubthaig	died 17 March 1136	
Máel Mochta Ua Fidabra (Ua Máel Sechlainn)	died 1173	
Áed Ua Máel Eóin	died 1153	
Tigernach Ua Máel Eóin	died 1172	
Máel Ciaráin Ua Fidabra	died 1181	
Máel Muire Ua Máel Eóin	died 1230	
Máel Ciaráin Ó Máel Eóin	died 1263	
Tomás	fl. 1268	
Pol mac Teige Mac Teithechán	died 1384	
Niall Ó Sheridan	fl. 14th century	
Cahir Mac Cochláin	died 1539.	
