= Mughron mac Ceannfaeladh =

Irish abbot (died 882)

Mughron mac Ceannfaeladh (died 882) was Abbot of Clonfert.

== Biography ==
Mughron was a successor to Brendan. His death is listed in the Annals of the Four Masters but little else seems to be known of him. The abbatical succession at Clonfert during this era is unclear, and it is uncertain who preceded or succeeded him.

Other notable Irish eccleastical deaths in 882 included Maeltuile mac Fethghnach, Abbot of Glas Noedhen; Tuilelaith inion Uarghalach, Abbess of Kildare.

Events in Ireland and Connacht during his lifetime included:

- 878 - Cearbhall mac Cu Coirne, heir of Cashel, dies.
- 880 - Aenghus, son of Maelduin, heir apparent of the North, was beheaded by the Dal Araidhe.
- 881 - Death of Cormac mac Ceithearnach, Prior of Terryglass and Clonfert, half-lord of Lough Ree.
- 882 - A male child spoke at Craebh Laisre two months after his birth.
