= Bealin High Cross =

High cross and National Monument located near Athlone, County Westmeath, Ireland

Baylin High Cross
- Ardchros Bhéal Linne (Irish)
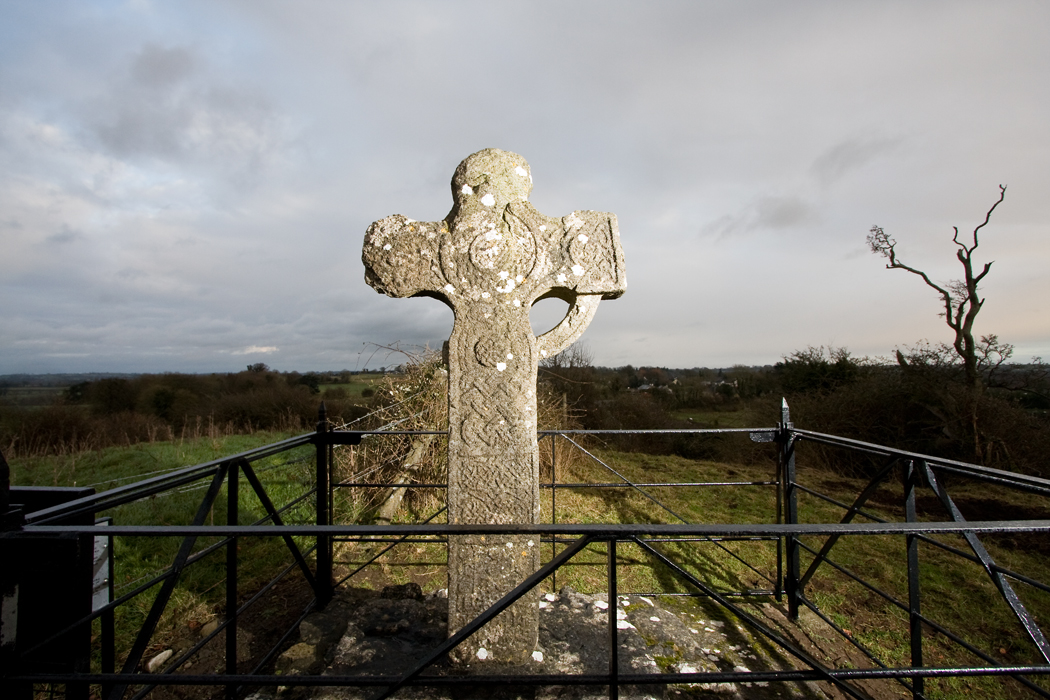
- West side view of cross

- Location within Ireland
- 53.435149°N 7.844919°W
- Type: High cross
- Location: Twyford Demesne, County Westmeath, Ireland

History
- Built: c. AD 800

Site notes
- Height: 2 m (6 ft 7 in)

National monument of Ireland
- Official name: Bealin Cross
- Reference no.: 223

Baylin High Cross is a high cross and National Monument located near Athlone, County Westmeath, Ireland.

== Location ==
Baylin High Cross is located about 6.2 km (3.9 mi) east of Athlone.

== Description ==
The cross is believed to have been moved, perhaps from Clonmacnoise. On the east face was a lion and a scroll of interlaced creatures with birdlike heads running up the shaft, and a Celtic knot pattern at the centre of the head. The North face shows a hunting scene with a horseman with spear and a dog biting a deer's leg.

There is an inscription at the bottom of the west face dating the cross to around AD 800: the inscription reads OROIT AR TUATHGALL LAS DERNATH IN CHROSSA (Middle Irish: 'A prayer for Tuathgal who caused this cross to be made'), referring to the Abbot of Clonmacnoise who died in 811.

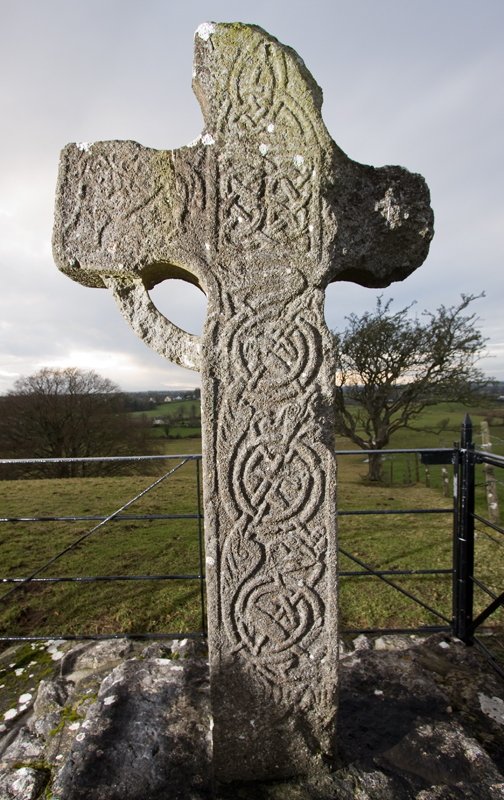
East side view

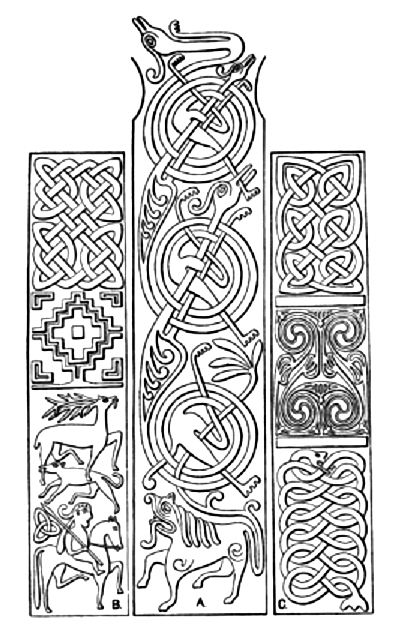
Crawford's sketch of ornamentations
