= The Dead at Clonmacnoise =

14th-century poem by Aongus Ó Giolláin

The Dead at Clonmacnoise is a 14th-century poem by Aongus Ó Giolláin. It commemorates the many royal kings and princes of Ireland that were buried there.

== Excerpt (translation) ==
There they laid to rest the seven Kings of Tara
there the sons of Coirpre sleep –
battle-banners of the Gael, that in Kieran's plain of crosses
now their final hosting keep.

== See also ==
- Clonmacnoise
