= Clonfert Cathedral =

Cathedral in County Galway, Ireland

- Cathedral Church of St Brendan
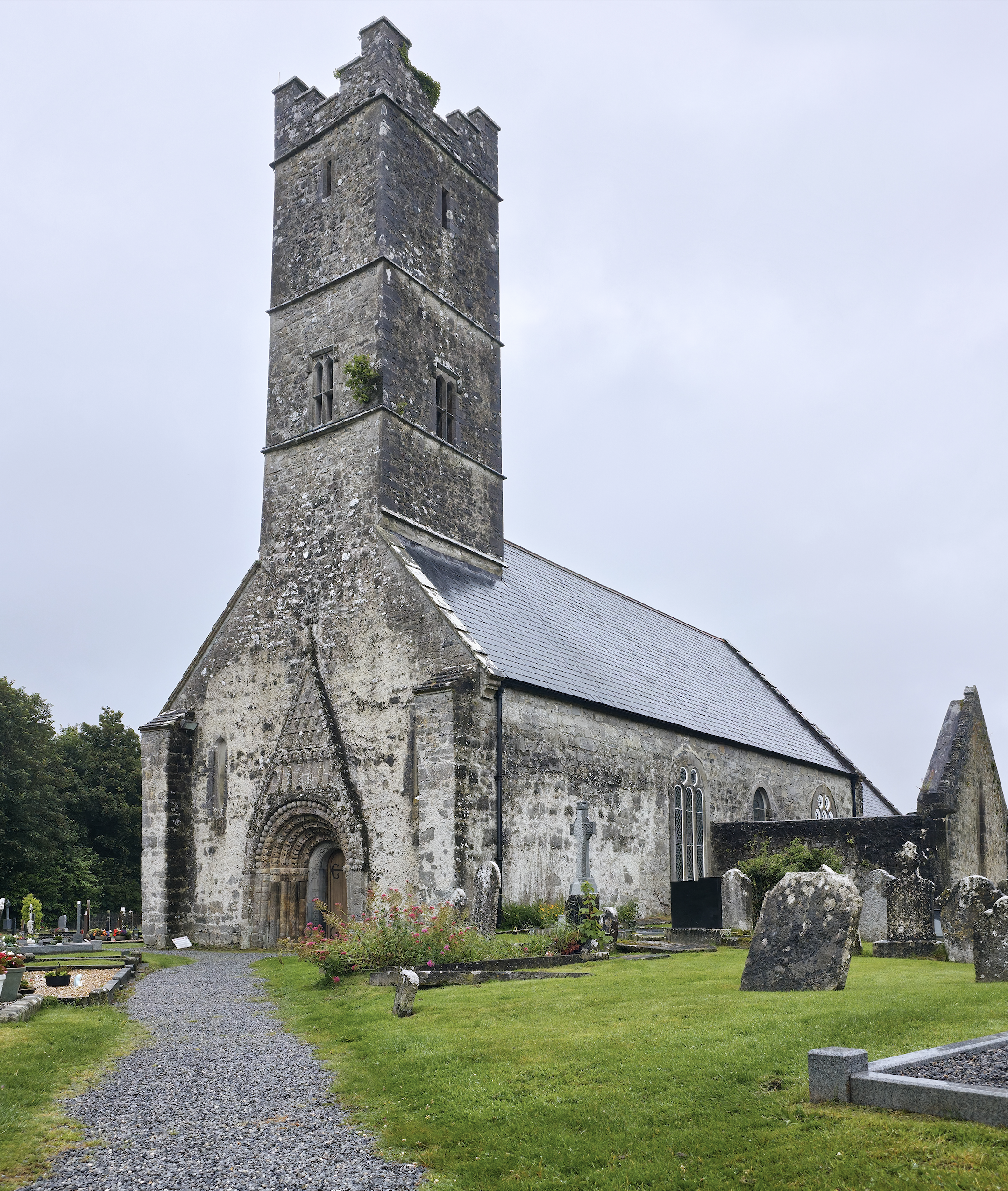

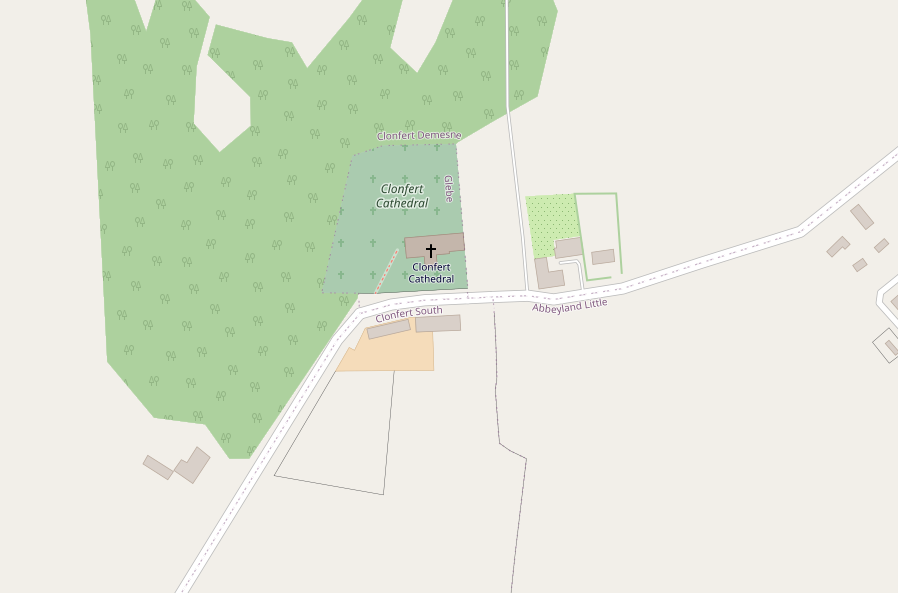
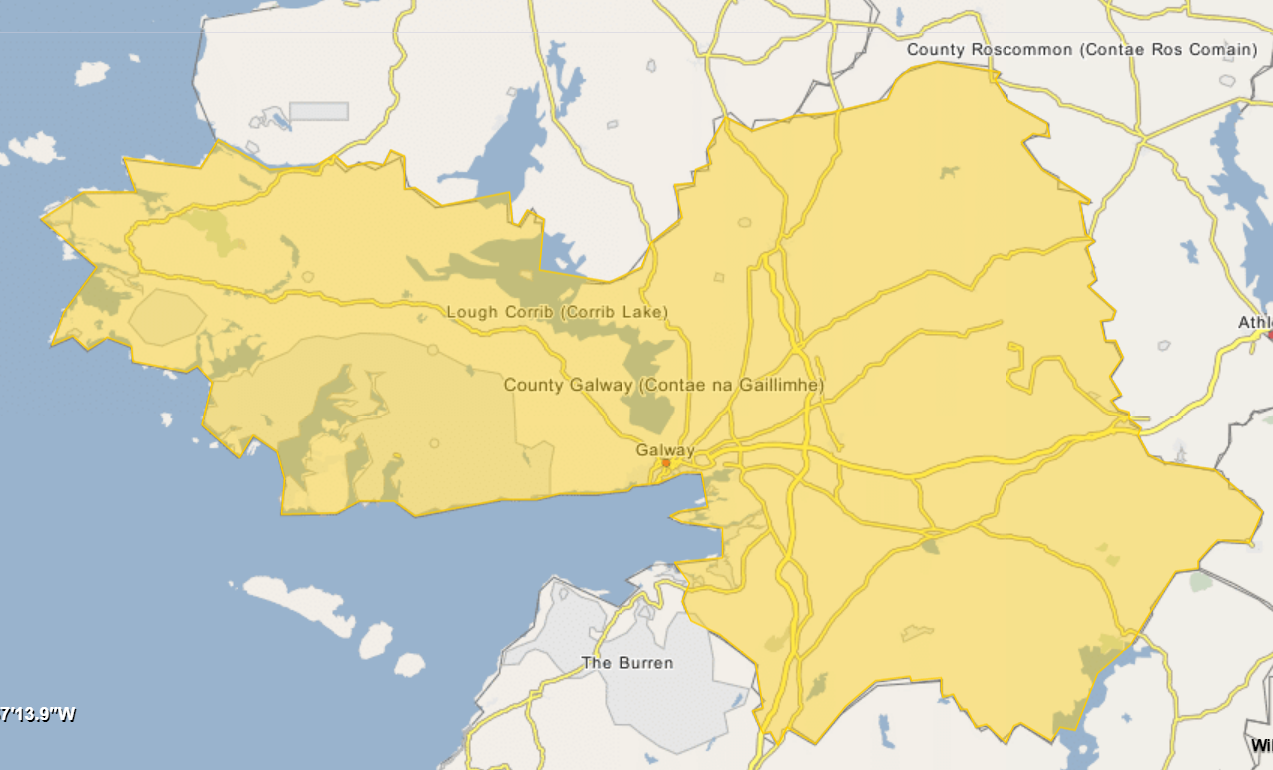
- Location in Clonfert Clonfert Cathedral (County Galway) Clonfert Cathedral (Ireland)
- 53.240651°N 8.058621°W
- Country: Ireland
- Denomination: Church of Ireland
- Previous denomination: Roman Catholic

History
- Dedication: St Brendan

Architecture
- Style: Romanesque, Gothic

Administration
- Province: Province of Dublin
- Diocese: Diocese of Tuam, Limerick and Killaloe

Clergy
- Bishop: Kenneth Kearon
- Dean: The Very Reverend Roderick Lindsay Smyth

Clonfert Cathedral is a cathedral of the Church of Ireland in Clonfert, County Galway in Ireland. Previously the cathedral of the Diocese of Clonfert and then one of three cathedrals in the United Dioceses of Limerick and Killaloe, it is now one of five cathedrals in the Diocese of Tuam, Limerick and Killaloe.

The current building was erected in the 12th century in the Hiberno-Romanesque style The site had an earlier church founded by Saint Brendan in 563, which was associated with a monastery he founded and at which he was buried. The dean of the cathedral is the Very Reverend Roderick Lindsay Smyth who is also Dean of Killaloe, Dean of Kilfenora and both Dean and Provost of Kilmacduagh.

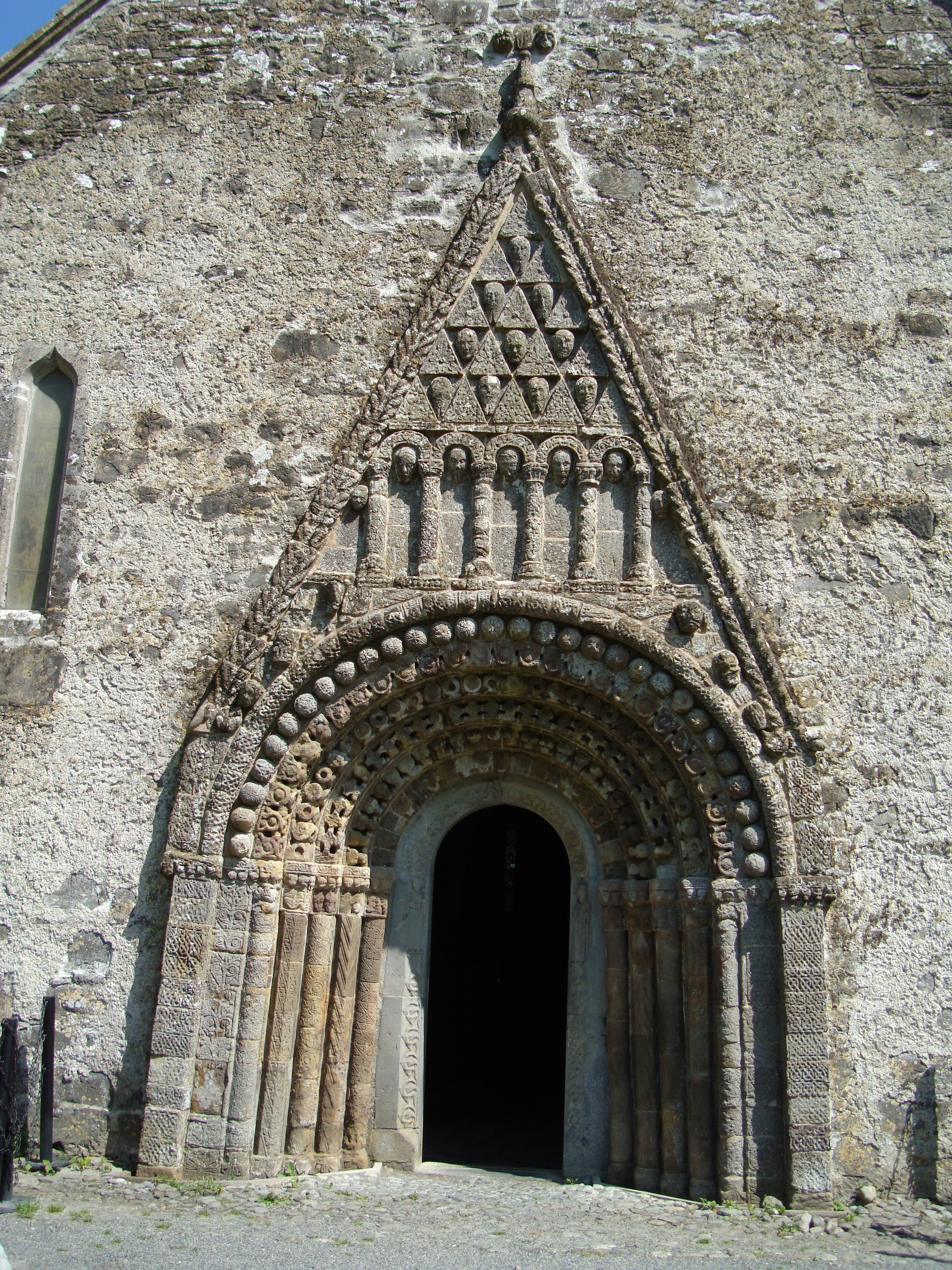
Detail of doorway

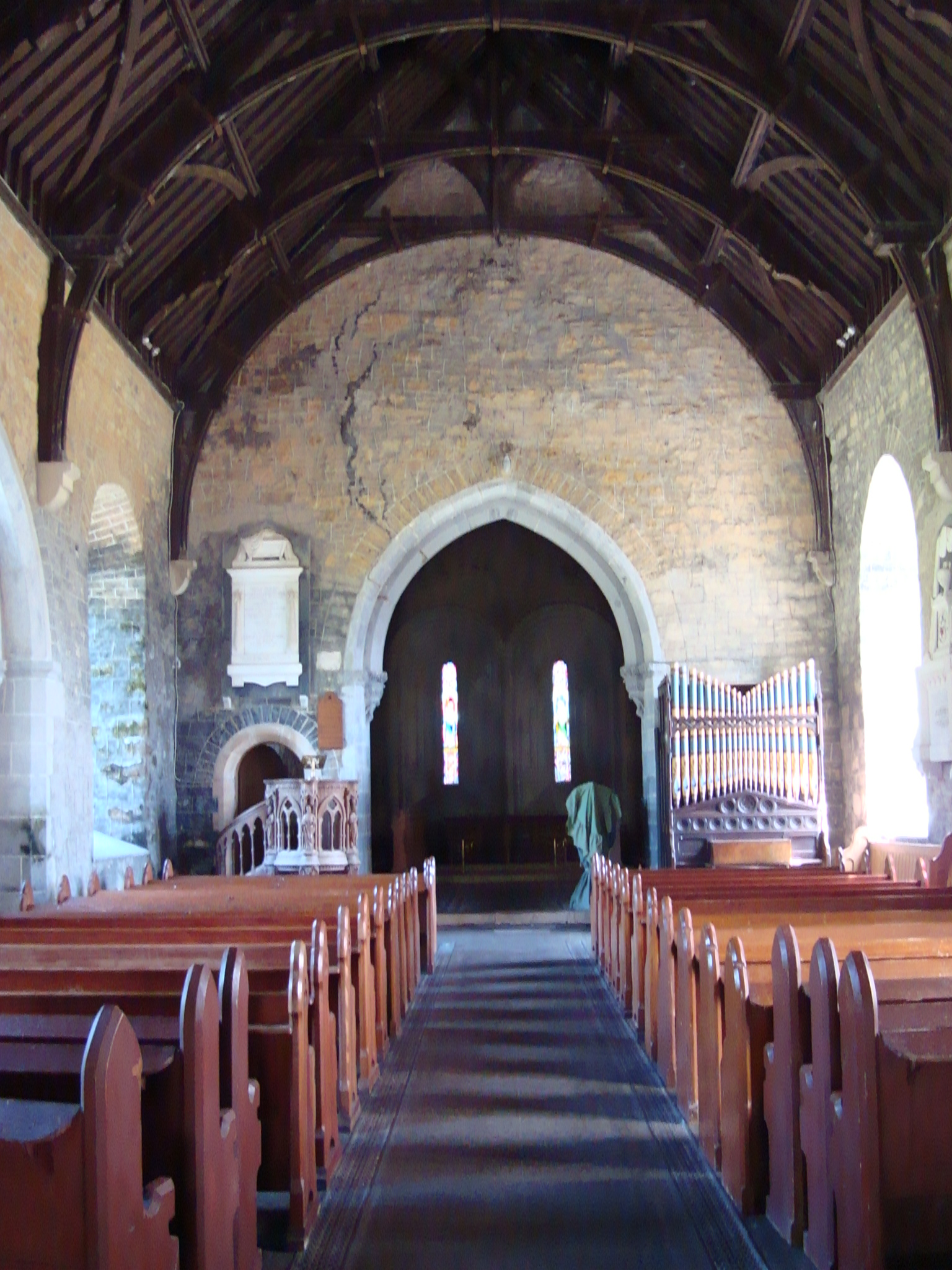
Nave

== Description of the cathedral ==
The earliest part of the church dates back to around 1180. Its doorway is the crowning achievement of Hiberno-Romanesque style. It is in six orders, and has a large variety of motifs, animal heads, foliage, human heads etc. Above the doorway is a pointed hood enclosing triangles alternating with bizarre human heads, and below this is an arcade enclosing more human heads. The early 13th century east windows in the chancel is an example of a late Romanesque windows. The chancel arch was inserted in the 15th century, and is decorated with angels, a rosette and a mermaid carrying a mirror. The mermaid is worn smooth from human hands. The supporting arches of the tower at the west end of the church are also decorated with 15th century heads, and the innermost order of the Romanesque doorway was also inserted at this time. The sacristy is also 15th century. The church had a Romanesque south transept, which is now in ruins, and a Gothic north transept, which has been removed. In the Roman Catholic church one mile to the south is a 14th-century wooden statue of the Madonna and Child, and on the roadside near this church is a 16th-century tower-house.

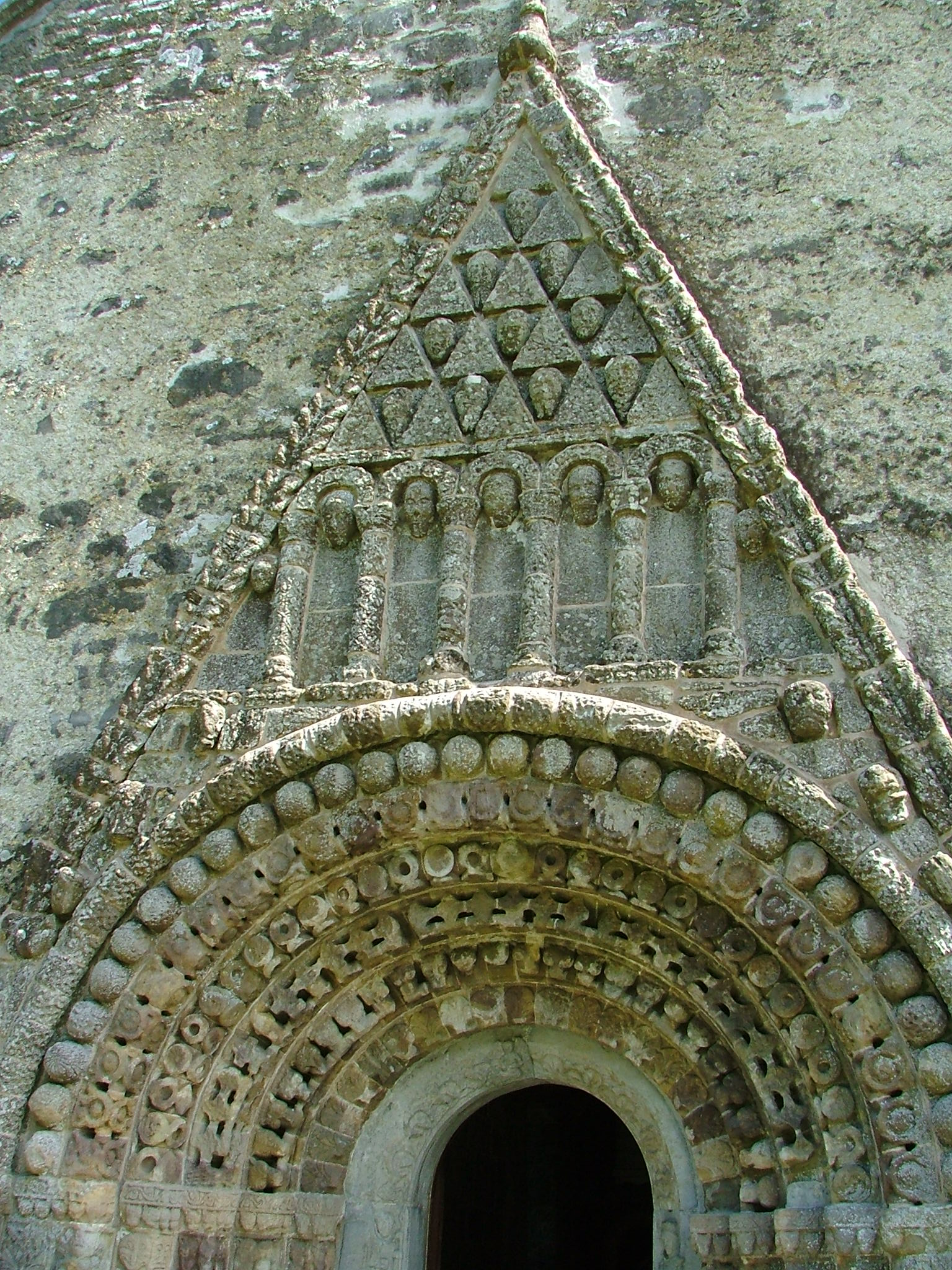

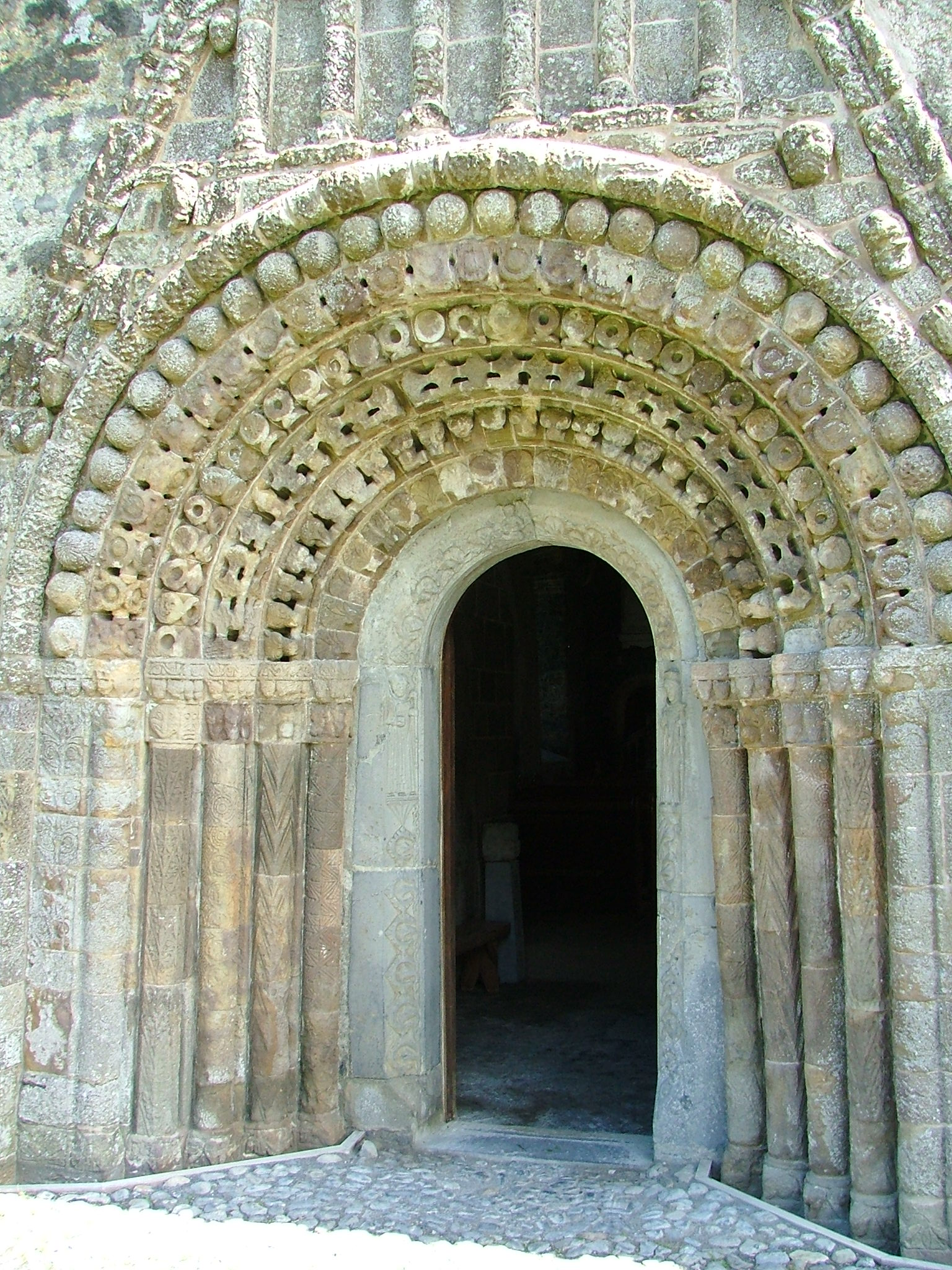

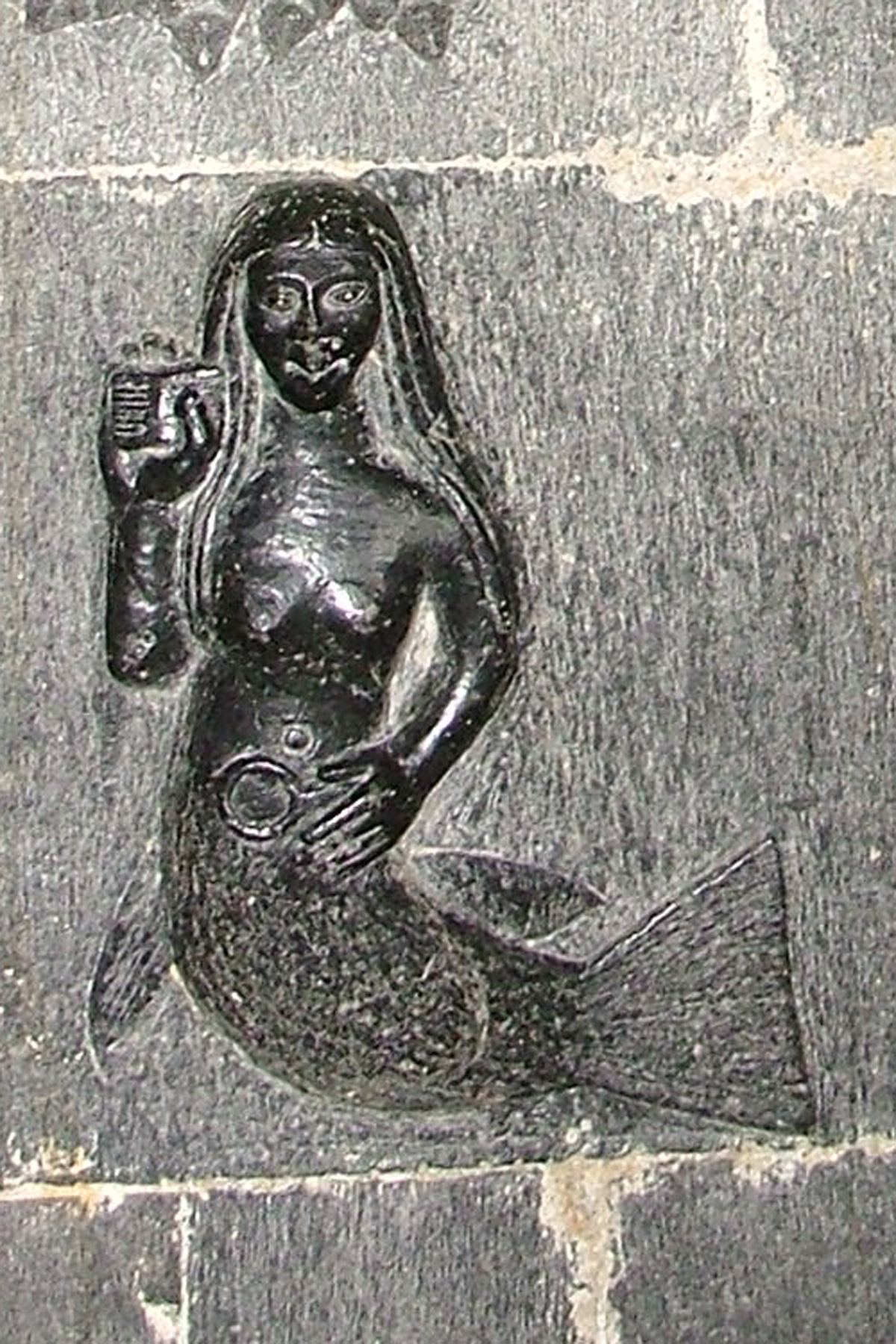

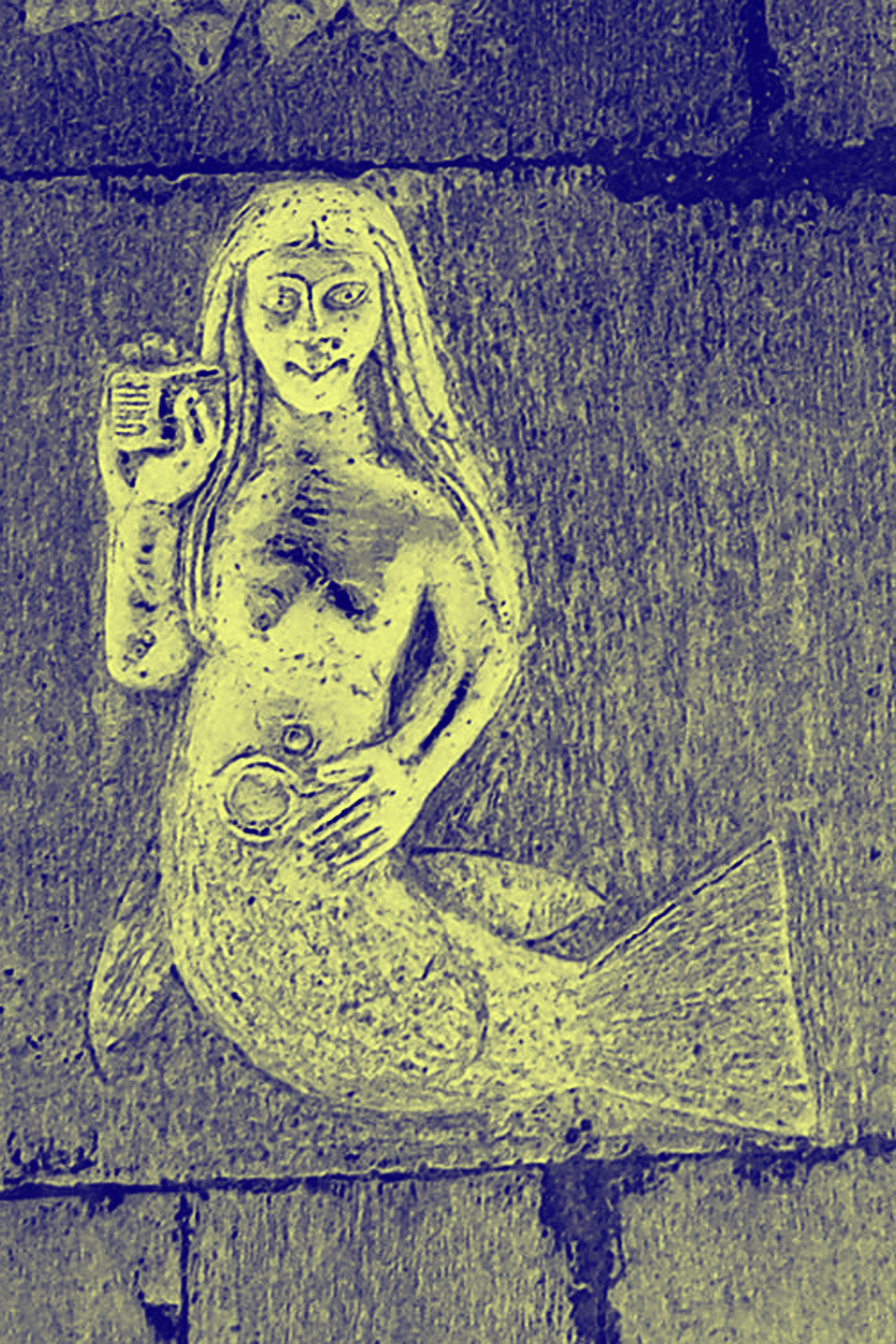

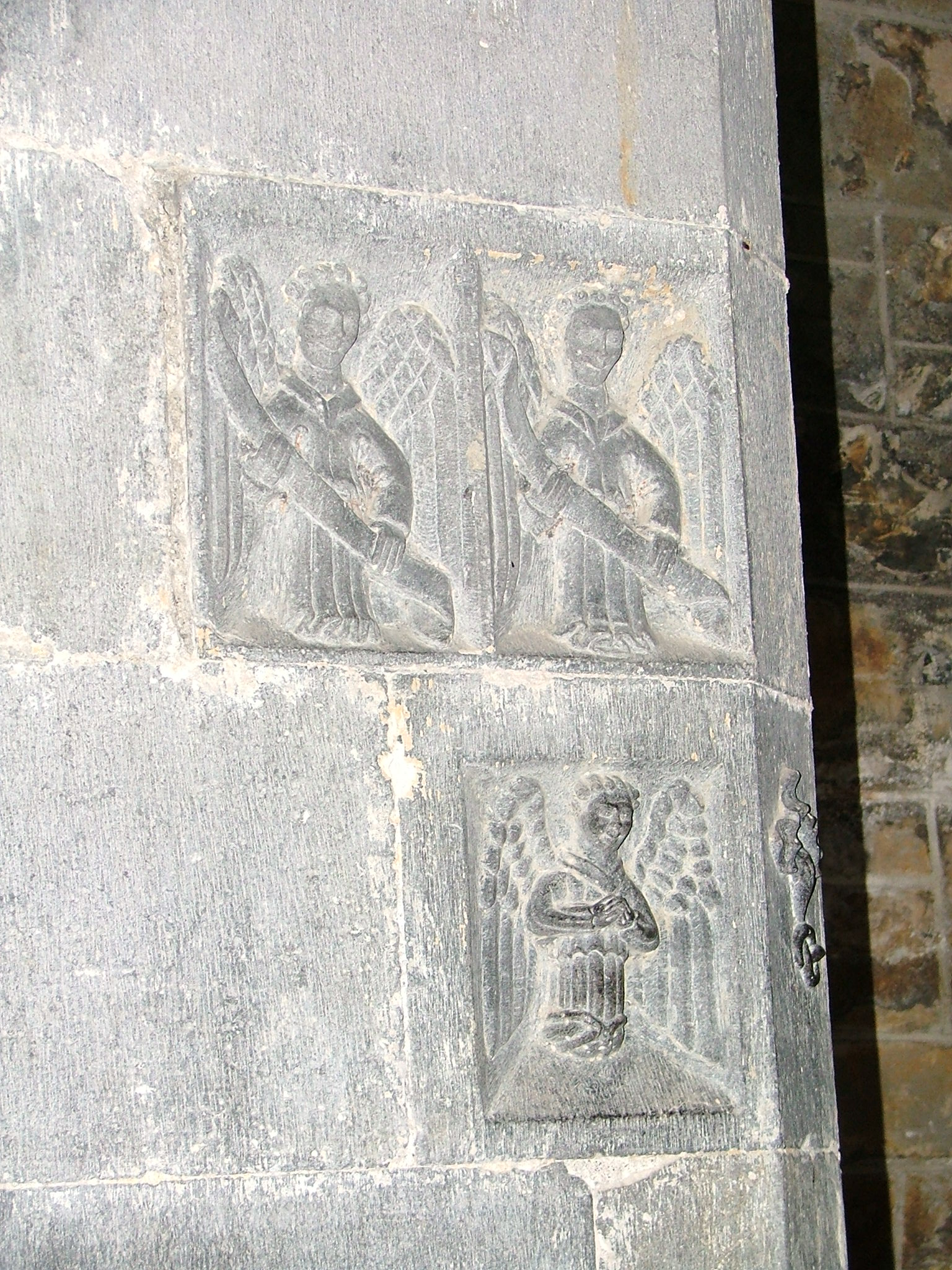

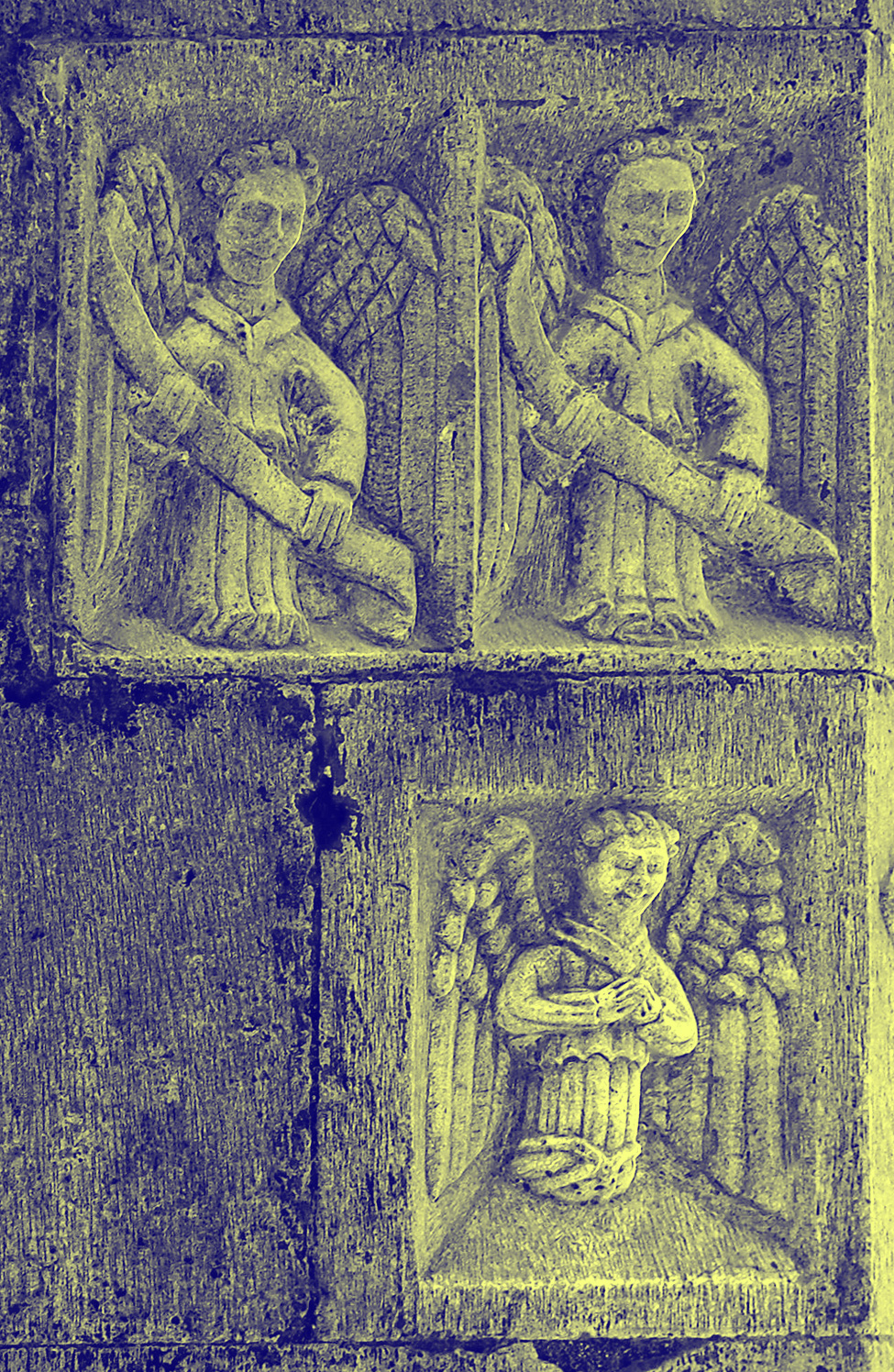

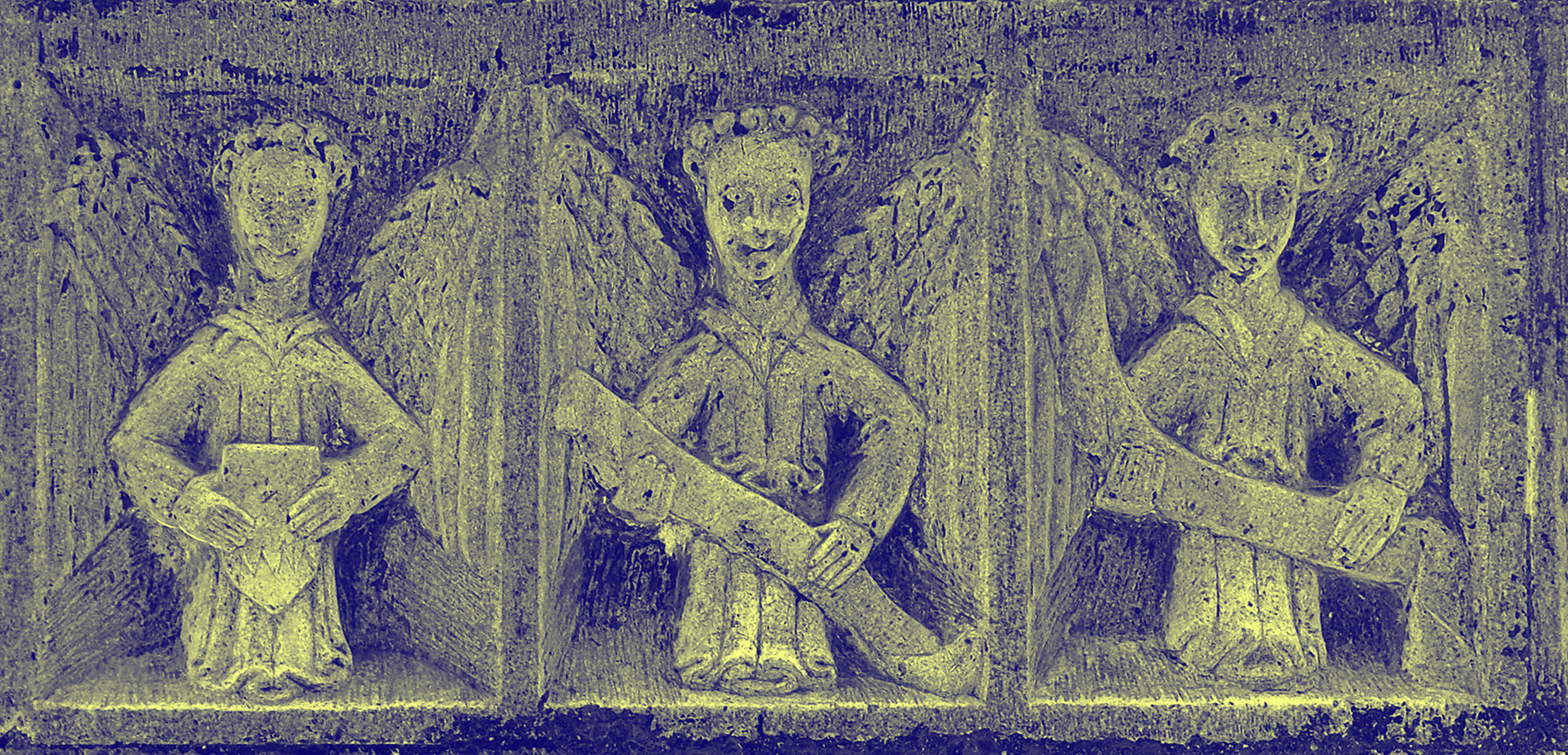

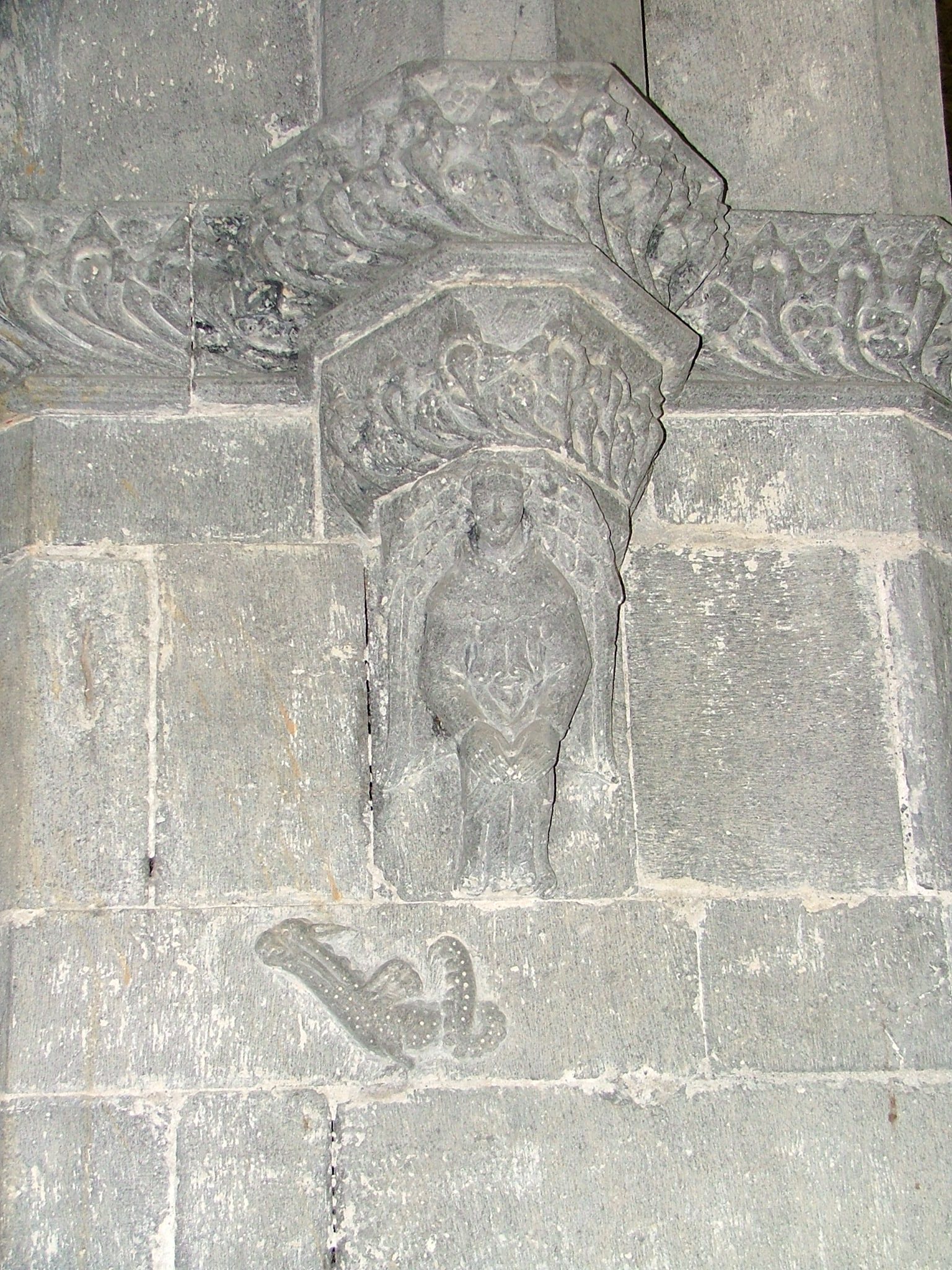

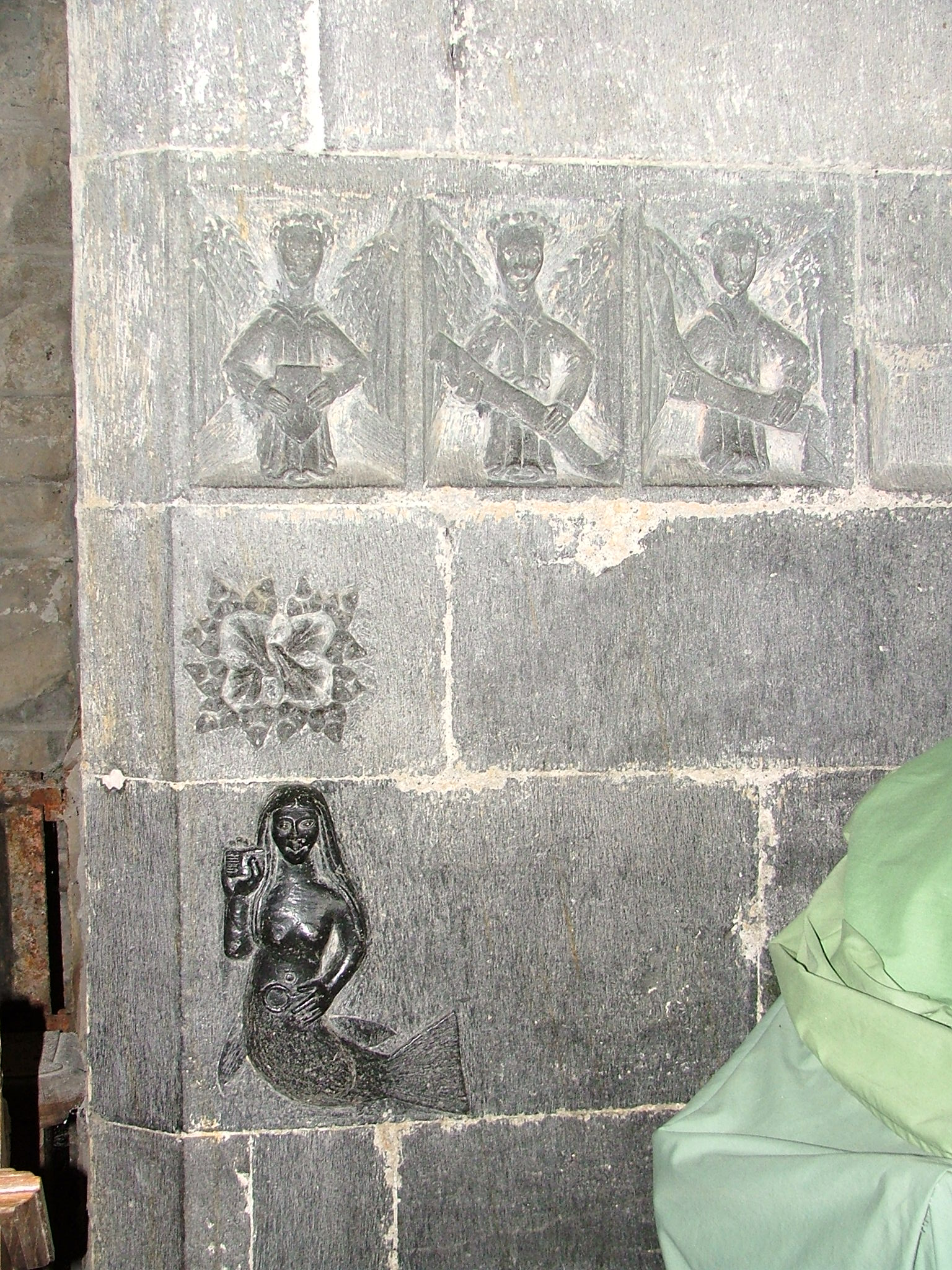

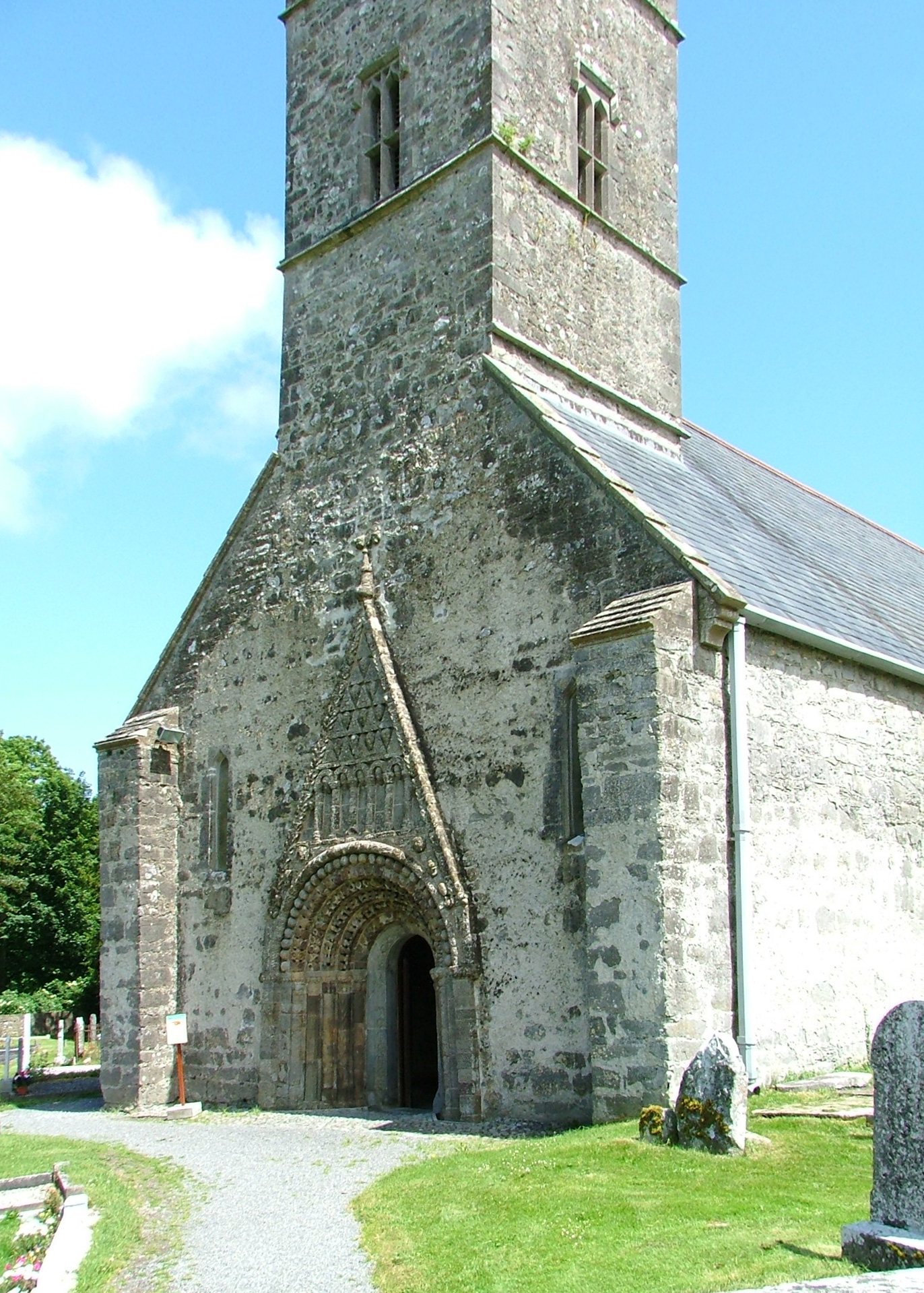

== Preservation ==
Clonfert Cathedral was included in the 2000 World Monuments Watch by the World Monuments Fund. The soft sandstone structure had weathered severely, and prior conservation efforts, which did not fully address all the building's problems, as well as substantial biological growth, had compounded the deterioration. Due to the limited resources of the dwindling congregation, American Express provided financial assistance through the organization.

== Clonfert in the Annals ==
Clonfert is mentioned numerous times in the Chronicon Scotorum.

- 561 – In which the battle of Cúl Dreimne is what is to be recorded, and in which Ainmire, son of Sétna, and Ainnedid son of Fergus, and Domnall were victors. Diarmait, however, was put to flight; and on this day Cluain Ferta Brénainn was founded at the order of an angel. [AU 558, 560, 561, 564; AU 558]
- 570 – Repose of Íte of Cluain, i.e. the fostermother of Jesus Christ and of Brénainn, i.e., of Cluain Ferta. [AI, AU 570, AU 577].
- 572 – Maenu, bishop of Cluain Ferta Brénainn, rested. [CS]
- 621 – Senach Garb, abbot of Cluain Ferta, dies. [AT, AI 604]
- 636 – Repose of Carthach, abbot of Cluain Ferta Brénainn, who is called Ségán. [AI]
- 729 – Fachtna son of Folochtach, abbot of Clonfert, dies. [AT]
- 749 – The burning of Cluain Ferta Brénainn. [AT, AI 752]
- 752 – Repose of Fiachna grandson of Mac Niad, abbot of Cluain Ferta Brénainn. [AT]
- 753 – Death of Cellan, abbot of Cluain Ferta Brénainn. [AT]
- 762 – Suibne abbot of Brenann's Clonfert. [AT]
- 766 – The falling asleep of Crimthann, abbot of Cluain Ferta. [AT, AI]
- 773 – Ceithernach grandson of Erumain, abbot of Cluain Ferta Brénainn, died. [AI 768, AU 773]
- 776 – Tipraite son of Ferchar, abbot of Cluain Ferta Brénainn, died. [AU 776 & 795]
- 783 – Flaithnia's son, abbot of Cluain Ferta, died. [AI]
- 794 – Tipraite, abbot of Cluain Ferta Brénainn, [rested]. [AI]
- 802 – Muiredach son of Óchobor, abbot of Cluain Ferta Brénainn, died. [AI 792, AI 802]
- 807 – A battle between the community of Corcach and the community of Cluain Ferta Brénainn, among whom resulted a slaughter of a countless number of ordinary ecclesiastics and of eminent men of the community of Corcach.
- 813 – Congaltach son of Eitguin, prior of Cluain Ferta, dies.
- 817 – Tipraite mac Cethernach, abbot of Cluain Ferta Brénainn, died. [AI, CS 816]
- 820 – Laithbheartach, son of Aenghus, Bishop of Cluain Fearta Brenainn ... died.
- 826 – Ruithnél, superior and bishop of Cluain Ferta Brénainn, dies. [AU]
- 838 – A great assembly of the men of Ireland in Cluain Ferta Brénainn, and Niall son of Aed, king of Temuir, submitted to Feidlimid, son of Crimthann, so that Feidlimid became full king of Ireland that day, and he occupied the abbot's chair of Cluain Ferta. [AI]
- 844 – Cluain Ferta Brénainn was burned by heathens from Loch Rí. [AU, CS].
- 845 – There was an encampment of the foreigners i.e. under Tuirgéis on Loch Rí, and they plundered Connacht and Mide, and burned Cluain Moccu Nóis with its oratories, and Cluain Ferta Brénainn, and Tír dá Glas and Lothra and other monasteries. [AU]
- 850 – Rechtabra, abbot of Cluain Ferta Brénainn, rested. [CS, AI]
- 866 – Tomrar the Jarl, plundered Cluain Ferta Brénainn, and Brénainn killed him on [the] third day after he had reached his camp. [AI]
- 882 – Cormac son of Ciarán, prior of Cluain Ferta Brénainn and superior of Tuaim dá Gualann, dies.
- 884 – Cormac son of Ceithernach (member of Clann Choman branch of the Cairpri Feichine of the Ui Maine), prior of Tír dá Glas and Cluain Ferta Brénainn, rested. [AU]. His son's genealogy is record in the Book of Lecan, as: Conall, mac Cormaic, mic Ceithernaig, mic Fogartaig, mic Fearadaig, mic Eachtgaile, mic Sechnasaigh (King of the Ui Maine d.713), mic Congail, mic Eogain, mic Comain, mic Brenaind Daill, mic Cairpri Feichine, mic Fearadaig, mic Luigdheach, mic Dallain, mic Bresail, mic Máine Móir. His grandfather Cethernach mac Fogartaigh, prioir Tíre Dá Ghlas, died in 843 [AFM].
- 885 – Mugrón son of Cenn Faelad, superior of Cluain Ferta Brénainn, died. [AU]
- 888 – Mael Tuile son of Cilén, superior of Cluain Ferta Brénainn, rested. [AU]
- 891 – Mael Petair, son of Cúán, took Cluain Ferta Brénainn. [AI]
- 895 – Repose of Mael Petair son of Cúán, abbot of Tír dá Glas and Cluain Ferta Brénainn. [AI]
- 916 – Aed son of Ailill, abbot of Cluain Ferta Brénainn, died. [AU, AI]
- 922 – Cormac mac Aedán, bishop of Cluain Ferta Brénainn, rested. [AI, CS]
- 946 – Repose of Dub Scuile of Cluain Ferta Brénainn, [AI]
- 949 – The spoiling of Sil-Anmchadha (Síol Anmchadha), and the plundering of Cluain-fearta-Brenainn and Cluain Moccu Nóis, by Ceallachan and by Donnchadh, the men of Munster. [AI 951]
- 954 – Repose of Cenn Faelad son of Suibne, anchorite of Cluain Ferta Brénainn. [AI]
- 958 = Repose of Aed son of Cellach, abbot of Cluain Ferta Brénainn. [AI]
- 973 – Repose of Cinaed of in Durthach, anchorite of Ireland, in Cluain Ferta Brénainn [AI]
- 981 – Eoghan ua Cathán, successor of Brénainn of Cluain Ferta, died. [CS, AI]
- 992 – Mael Petair, successor of Brénainn of Cluain Ferta, rested. [CS, AI]
- 1007 – Fiachra, priest of Cluain Ferta Brénainn, rested in Christ. [AI]
- 1016 – Cluain Moccu Nóis and Cluain Ferta and Cenannas were burned. [AU, CS]
- 1026 – Mael Ruanaid Ua Maíl Doraid, king of the North, [went] on his pilgrimage to Cluain Ferta Brénainn, and proceeded from there to Í Coluim Chille, and thence to Rome. [AI]
- 1031 – Eochu son of Scolaige, bishop of Cluain Ferta Brénainn, rested; and Mac Mara got the gift of poetry(?) after he had fasted 'against' Brénainn at Ard Ferta. [AI]
- 1034 – Ó Ruairc, that is, the Cork, and the men of Bréifne, plundered St Brénainn's Clonfert, and on the same day he was defeated by Donnchadh with the crew of one ship, came upon them fourteen galleys strong, and defeated them, inflicting a slaughter upon them round the Soc and the Sinann. [AT, CS 1034, AI 1035]
- 1035 – Aengus Ua Flainn, coarb of Brénainn of Cluain Ferta, rested. [CS 1036, AI 1036]
- 1043 – Cluain Ferta Brénainn was plundered by the Callraige. [AI]
- 1044 – Célechair, the anchorite, rested in Cluain Ferta Brénainn. [AI]
- 1045 – Clonfert, with its stone church, was burned by the Ui-Maine. Cuchonnacht, son of Gadhra Ua Dunadhaigh, was taken out of it by them and slain on the church lawn. [CS 1044, AI 1015]
- 1065 – The plundering of Cluain moccu Nóis by the Conmaicne and the Uí Maine. Cluain Ferta was plundered by them on the next day i.e. by Aed ua Ruairc, king of Bréifne, and the son of Tadc ua Cellaigh and his son. Aed ua Conchobuir inflicted a defeat on them the next day by the grace of Ciarán, inflicted a slaughter upon them on the Sinann and on land, and they left behind their following and their ships. [CS, AI 1065]
- 1068 – Cluain Ferta Brénainn was vacated and its seniors came into Iarmumu. [AI]
- 1094 – Ua Corcráin, coarb of Brénainn of Cluain Ferta, rested. [AI]
- 1112 – Gilla Muire ua Fogurtaigh, successor of Brénainn of Cluain Ferta, died of a fall after offending Ciarán by burning the cattle-house. [CS]
- 1117 – Muiredach ua hEnlainge, bishop of Cluain Ferta of Brénainn, fell asleep in Christ.
- 1136 – Domhnall Ua Dubhthaigh, Archbishop of Connaught ... died after mass and celebration at Cluain-fearta-Brenainn.
- 1149 – Gilla Pátraic ua Ailcinned, bishop of Cluain Ferta Brénainn, rested. [CS]
- 1162 – The relics of Bishop Maeinenn and of Cummaine Foda were removed from the earth by the clergy of Brenainn, and they were enclosed in a protecting shrine.
- 1171 – Petrus, bishop of Cluain Ferta Brénainn, was drowned in the Sinann on the sixth of the Kalends of January [27 December]. [AI]
- 1179 – Clonfert-Brendan, with its churches, were burned.
- 1186 – Maelcallann, son of Adam Mac Clerken, Bishop of Clonfert-Brendan, died.
- 1190 – A meeting was held at Clonfert-Brendan, to conclude a peace between Cathal Crovderg and Cathal Carragh. All the Sil-Murray repaired to this meeting, together with the successor of St. Patrick, Conor Mac Dermot, and Aireaghtagh O'Rodiv; but they could not be reconciled to each other on this occasion. O'Conor and the Sil-Murray went to Clonmacnoise on that night, and early next morning embarked in their fleet, and sailed up the Shannon until they came to Lough Ree. A violent storm arose on the lake, by which their vessels were separated from each other; and the storm so agitated the vessel in which O'Conor was, that it could not be piloted. Such was the fury of the storm, it foundered, and all the crew perished, except O'Conor himself and six others. In this vessel with O'Conor (Cathal Crovderg) were Areaghtagh O'Rodiv and Conor, son of Cathal, who were both drowned, as were also Conor and Auliffe, the two sons of Hugh Mageraghty; O'Mulrenin, and the son of O'Monahan, and many others.
- 1195 – Donnell Ó Finn, Coarb of Clonfert-Brendan, died. [AI]
- 1202 – Murtough O'Carmacan, Bishop of Clonfert-Brendan, died. [AI 1203]
- 1266 – A bishop-elect came from Rome to Clonfert-Brendan, and the dignity of bishop was conferred on him, and on TomásÓ Mhiadhachán, at Athenry, on the Sunday before Christmas.

== See also ==
- Abbot of Clonfert
- Bishop of Clonfert
- Dean of Killaloe and Clonfert
- Cormac mac Ceithearnach
- List of abbeys and priories in the Republic of Ireland (County Galway)
- List of cathedrals in Ireland
