= Eriugena (disambiguation) =

Eriugena is an adjective meaning Ireland-born. It was typically used in the early Middle Ages as a surname when it was common to distinguish people by labeling them according to where they were born or lived. It has been notably applied to the following philosophers;

- Augustine Eriugena
- John Scotus Eriugena

In modern times it is often mistaken as a family name.

== See also ==
- Onomastics
