= Rechtnia =

Rechtnia, 27th Abbot of Clonmacnoise, died 784.

Rechtnia succeeded Collbran who died in 776. Rechtnia was a member of the Sil Coirpre Crum of Ui Maine, as was the 22nd abbot. During his term the monastery was burned, apparently by accident. He was succeeded by snedriagail.
