= Cormac ua Cairbre Crom =

Cormac ua Cairbre Crom, 22nd Abbot of Clonmacnoise, died 762.

Cormac succeeded Luccreth in 753. He was one of the most genealogically distinguished abbot, being a member of the Sil Coirpre Crom of Ui Maine, descended from King Cairbre Crom. Ryan writes that "The original social standing of this Cormac would thus, from the Irish racial standpoint, be higher than that of any of his predecessors, with the possible exception of Mac Nisse, the third abbot."

Events which occurred during his term included the following:

- burning of the monastery on 21 March 755.
- arrival of the pilgrim, Gorman of Lough, in 758.
- a battle between the monasteries of Birr and Clonmacnoise in 760.

Cormac was succeeded by Rónán, who died in 764.
