= Aedh mac Suibhne =

Aedh mac Suibhne was a chief or king of Máenmag.

In 581 the Annals of the Four Masters records the death of "Aedh mac Suibhne, toiseach Maonmuighe" (Aedh, son of Suibhne, chief of Maonmhagh). He was probably a ruler of the native dynasty, later termed the Uí Fiachrach Fionn, who were conquered by the Uí Maine in the 8th or 9th century. The territory later became the barony of Loughrea.
