= Richard Heaton (priest) =

Richard Heaton (1601–1666) was a Church of Ireland priest in Ireland.

Heaton was educated at Trinity College, Dublin. He was appointed Prebendary of Kilrush in Killaloe Cathedral in 1633 and Dean of Clonfert in 1662, holding both positions until his death in 1666. He was an amateur botanist.
