= Province of Dublin =

Province of Dublin may refer to:

- Province of Dublin (Church of Ireland)
- Province of Dublin (Roman Catholic)
