= Cellach mac Ségdai =

Cellach mac Segdai

Personal life
- Died: 740
- Known for: 20th Abbot of Clonmacnoise

Religious life
- Religion: Christianity
- Order: Abbot of Clonmacnoise

Senior posting
- Predecessor: Conmael ua Loichene
- Successor: Comman

Cellach mac Segdai, 20th Abbot of Clonmacnoise, died 740.

The Annals of Tigernach state that he came from Buidemnach; the Annals of the Four Masters state that he was of the Conmaicne, specifically the Conmaicne Cenoil Dubain or Conmaicne Dun Mor. This area is now centred on Dunmore, County Galway.

Cellach succeeded Conmael ua Loichene in 737. His own successor was Comman.
