= Colmán Cass mac Fualascaig =

Irish abbot (d. 665 CE)

Colman Cass mac Fualascaig, 10th Abbot of Clonmacnoise, died 665.

Colman was a member of the Corco Moga, as was the fifth abbot, To Lua Foto. The Chronicon Scotorum gives his term as one year and three days, while the Annals of Tigernach give it as one year.
