= Head of Eglaisi Bige, Clonmacnoise =

The airchinnech Eglaisi Bige (head of the little church) is an office associated with the monastery of Clonmacnoise between 898 and 1097. Nine persons are listed as its officers:

- Ecertach, son of Luchairén of the Meic Cuinn na mBocht. He was the father of Óenucán mac Écertaig (d. 949) and Dúnadach mac Écertaig (d. 955), both of whom became Bishop of Clonmacnoise. Died 898.
- Fiachra of Eglais beag, died 923.
- Óenucán mac Écertaig, a son of Ecertach (died 898) and germanus atavi of Conn na mbocht. Both he and his brother were apparently fostered in Louth, their tutor being Caíchormrac, bishop and princeps of Louth, who died in 903.
- Cathasach, died 978.
- Broen ua hAedha, possibly of the Múscraige of Munster, died 987.
- Cairpre mac Rodaighe, died 1037.
- Ailill Ua Máelchiaráin, died 1060.
- Aodh Ua Conghaile, died 1092. Listed as such by the Four Masters.
- Máeláan Ua Cuinn, a member of the Meic Cuinn na mBocht, died 1097.
