= Cormac mac Ceithearnach =

Cormac mac Ceithearnach, ruler and cleric, died 881.

== Biography ==
Cormac is described as the prior of Terryglass and Clonfert, "and the second lord who was over Loch Riach at that time."

Loch Riach is a lake at the foot of the Sliabh Eachtaí, located in a territory then called Máenmag; its ruling dynasty were the Ui Fiachrach Finn. In 802, The demolition of Loch Riach was undertaken by King Muirgius mac Tommaltaig of Connacht.

The town of Loughrea takes its name from Loch Riach.

== See also ==
- Fearghal mac Catharnach. died 881.
