= Cathrannach mac Cathal =

Cathrannach mac Cathal, possible King of Máenmag, died 801.

In 801 the Annals of Ulster records the deaths of Cathrannach mac Cathal of Maenmag, and the anchorite Ninnid. Nothing further appears to be known of Cathrannach. His death occurred at a time of conflict between the kingdoms of Aidhne and Uí Maine for control of Maenmaige, with Uí Maine eventually incorporating the kingdom into theirs.
