= To Lua Foto =

Irish abbot

To Lua Foto (died 614) was Abbot of Clonmacnoise.

To Lua Foto was a member of the Corco Moga of what is now north-east County Galway. The Corco Moga's homeland was based around what is now the parish of Kilkerrin. In the 10th century, the area was conquered by the Ui Briuin, who established a new dynasty of the Ui Diarmata as rulers.

He was preceded as abbot by Ailither and succeeded by Colman Moccu Bairdene.
