= Suibne mac Cuanach =

Irish abbot

Suibne mac Cuanach, 29th Abbot of Clonmacnoise, died 816.

Suibhne mac Cuanach was a member of the Uí Briúin Seola from what is now County Galway. The Chronicon Scotorum states that he "...rested thirty days after the burning of Cluain."
