= Cétadach =

9th century Irish abbot

Cétadach was the 31st Abbot of Clonmacnoise. He died in 848.

Cétadach succeeded Rónán, who resigned in 823 but only died in 844. The following events were recorded during his time as abbot:

- 845: There was an encampment of the foreigners under Tuirgéis on Loch Rí, and they plundered Connacht and Mide and burned Cluain moccu Nóis with its oratories, and Cluain Ferta Brénainn, and Tír da glas and Lothea and many monasteries.
- 846: The church-lands of Ciarán were plundered by Feidlimid son of Crimthann. Ciarán however followed him to Mumu and gave him a thrust of his crozier for it, so that he was afflicted with an internal wound.
- 847: Eógan son of Edacáin son of Torbarg, an anchorite, rested in Cluain moccu Nóis.

The Annals of the Four Masters state of him:

Cetadach, Abbot of Cluain Mic Nois, died. He was of the tribe of Ui Cormaic Maenmhaighe. It was in lamentation of him this quatrain was composed:All have heard it/both uncommon and common/That an abbot at Cluain like Cedadach/will never again be seen.
