= Ioseph of Loch Con =

Abbot of Clonmacnoise (died 904)

Ioseph of Loch Con (died 904), or Ioseph of Lough Conn, was the Abbot of Clonmacnoise. The Annals of Inisfallen, sub anno 899, state "Joseph of Loch Con, Abbot of Cluain Mic Nois, of the tribe of the northern Ui Fiachrach" died. The annals are often out of synch by as much as five years. Lough Conn is located in what is now County Mayo, in what was then the kingdom of Uí Fiachrach Muaidhe. This kingdom was in decline by the late 9th century, which may account for Ioseph's ascension as abbot, as Clonmacnoise generally took people from the non-royal or minor dynasties of Ireland. He may have been attached to a monastery active in these years in Lough Conn.
