= Slieve Aughty =

Mountains in counties Clare/Galway, Ireland

- Irish: Sliabh Eachtaí

Highest point
- Peak: Maghera
- Elevation: 400 m (1,300 ft)
- Coordinates: 53°03′N 8°31′W

Geography
- Country: Ireland
- Provinces of Ireland: Munster

The Slieve Aughty (Irish: Sliabh Eachtaí) are a mountain range in the western part of Ireland spread over both County Galway and County Clare. The highest peak in the Slieve Aughty Mountains is Maghera in Clare which rises to 400 m (1,314 ft). The mountain range consists of two ridges divided by the Owendallaigh river which flows west into Lough Cutra.

The Cenél Áeda na hEchtge partly derived their name from them.
