= Clonmacnoise =

Ruined monastery in County Offaly, Ireland

- Cluain Mhic Nóis
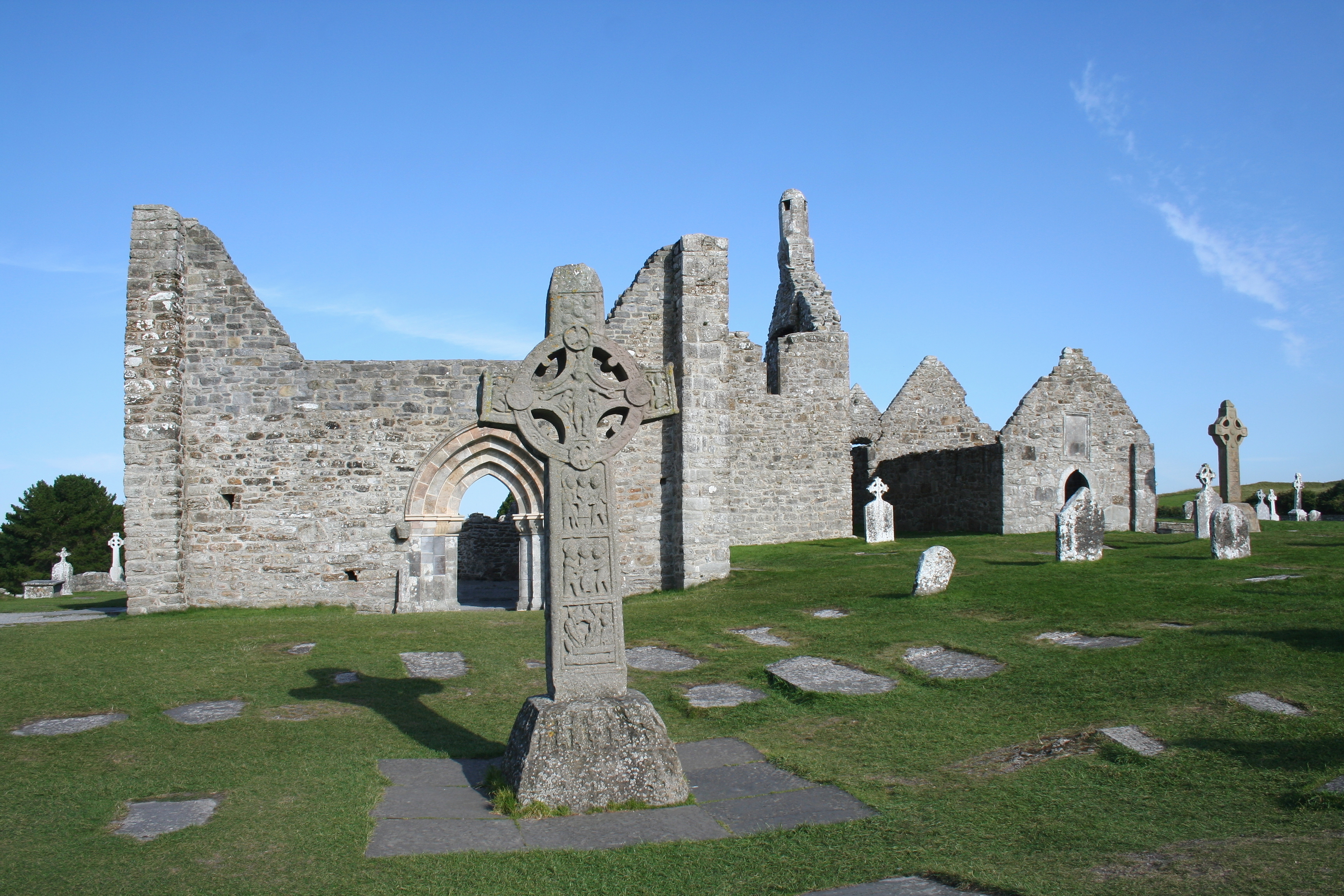
- Cross of the Scriptures, Cathedral, Temple Doolin and South Cross

- Location within Ireland
- Interactive map of Clonmacnoise

Monastery information
- Other names: Cluain-maccu-nois; Cluain-mic-nois; Cluan; Tipraic, with Eaglais-beaag
- Order: Canons Regular of Saint Augustine (1140–c.1144); Augustinian Canons Regular – Arroasian (1144–1568)
- Established: AD 544
- Disestablished: 1568
- Mother house: Clonard Abbey (mother house of nunnery only)
- Diocese: Diocese of Clonmacnoise

People
- Founder: St. Ciarán

Architecture
- Style: Celtic monastic

Site
- Location: near Athlone, County Offaly, Ireland
- Coordinates: 53°19′26″N 7°59′28″W
- Visible remains: cathedral, seven churches, two round towers, three high crosses, grave slabs
- Public access: yes
- Website: http://www.heritageireland.ie/en/midlands-eastcoast/clonmacnoise/

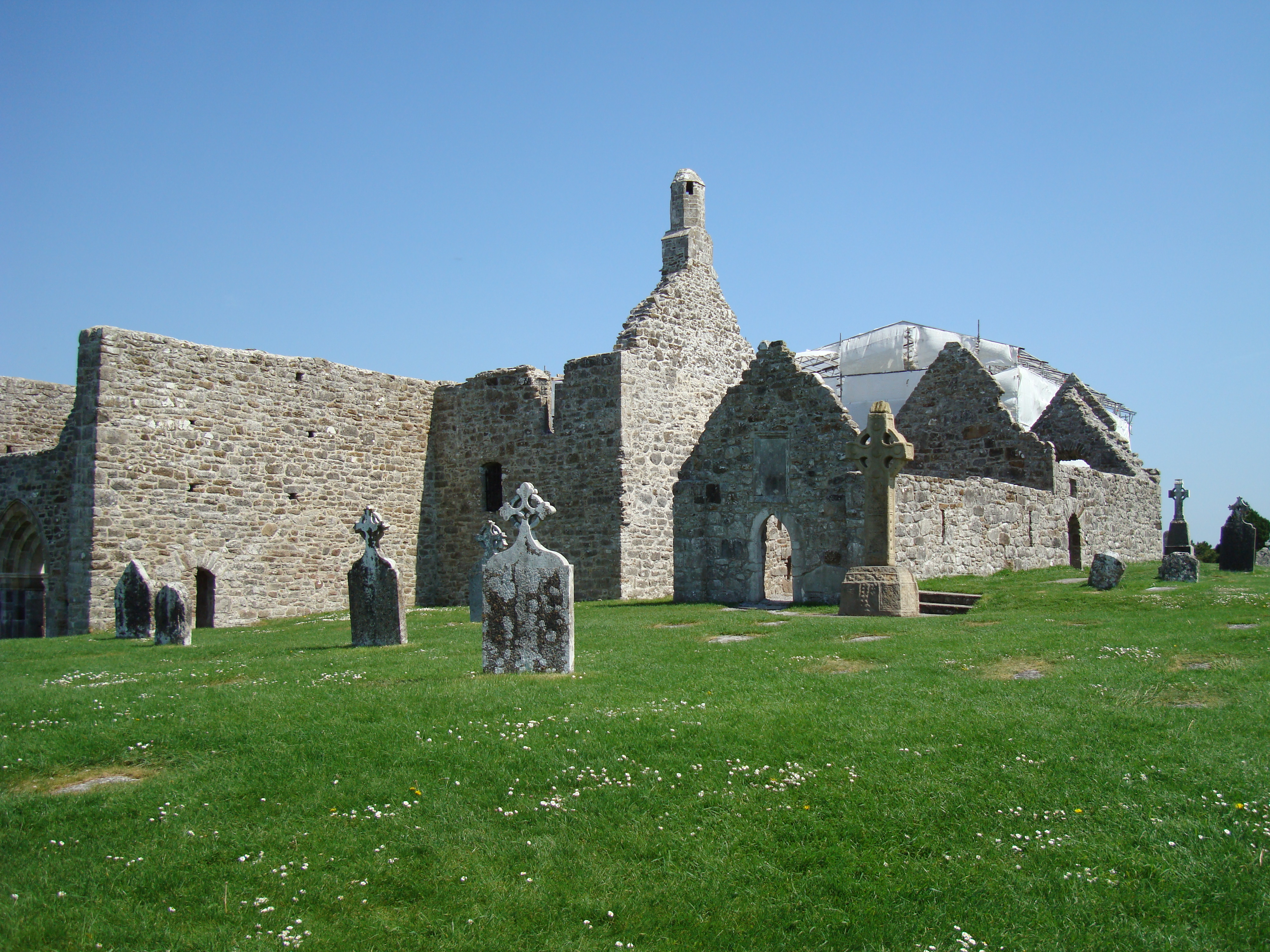
Clonmacnoise Cathedral from the south-east (centre and left), Temple Doolin and Temple Hurpan (right) and Temple Melaghlin (behind, covered)

Clonmacnoise or Clonmacnois (Irish: Cluain Mhic Nóis) is a ruined monastery in County Offaly in Ireland on the River Shannon south of Athlone, founded in 544 by Saint Ciarán, from Rathcroghan, County Roscommon. Until the 9th century it had close associations with the kings of Connacht.

Saint Ciarán founded the monastery in the ancient territory of Uí Maine at a point where the major east–west land route (Slighe Mhor) meets the River Shannon after crossing the bogs of Central Ireland known as the Esker Riada. The strategic location of the monastery helped it become a major centre of religion, learning, craftsmanship and trade by the 9th century; and together with Clonard it was one of the most famous places in Ireland, visited by scholars from all over Europe. From the ninth until the eleventh century it was allied with the kings of Meath. Many of the high kings of Tara (ardrí) and of Connacht were buried here.

Clonmacnoise was largely abandoned by the end of the 13th century. Today the site includes nine ruined churches, a castle, two round towers and a large number of carved stone crosses and cross-slabs. The Irish government's Office of Public Works manages the preserved ruin. An Interpretive Centre is open to the public, the graveyard is in use and religious services take place in a modern chapel.

== Geography ==
Clonmacnoise (meaning 'Meadow of the Sons of Nós') is situated in County Offaly, Ireland on the River Shannon south of Athlone.

== History ==
In 544 Saint Ciarán, a young man from Rathcroghan, County Roscommon, arrived at this location with seven companions. (Saint Ciarán is not to be confused or conflated with St. Ciarán of Saigir, patron of Osraige). Here he met Diarmait mac Cerbaill, who later became the first Christian crowned High King of Ireland. Together they built the first church at the site. This was a small wooden structure and the first of many small churches to be clustered on the site. In September 549, not yet thirty-three years of age, Ciarán died of a plague, and was reportedly buried under the original wooden church, now the site of the 9th-century stone oratory, Temple Ciarán. This location was particularly important because here the major east–west land route through the bogs of central Ireland along the Eiscir Riada (an esker left by the receding glaciers of the last ice age) crossed the River Shannon.

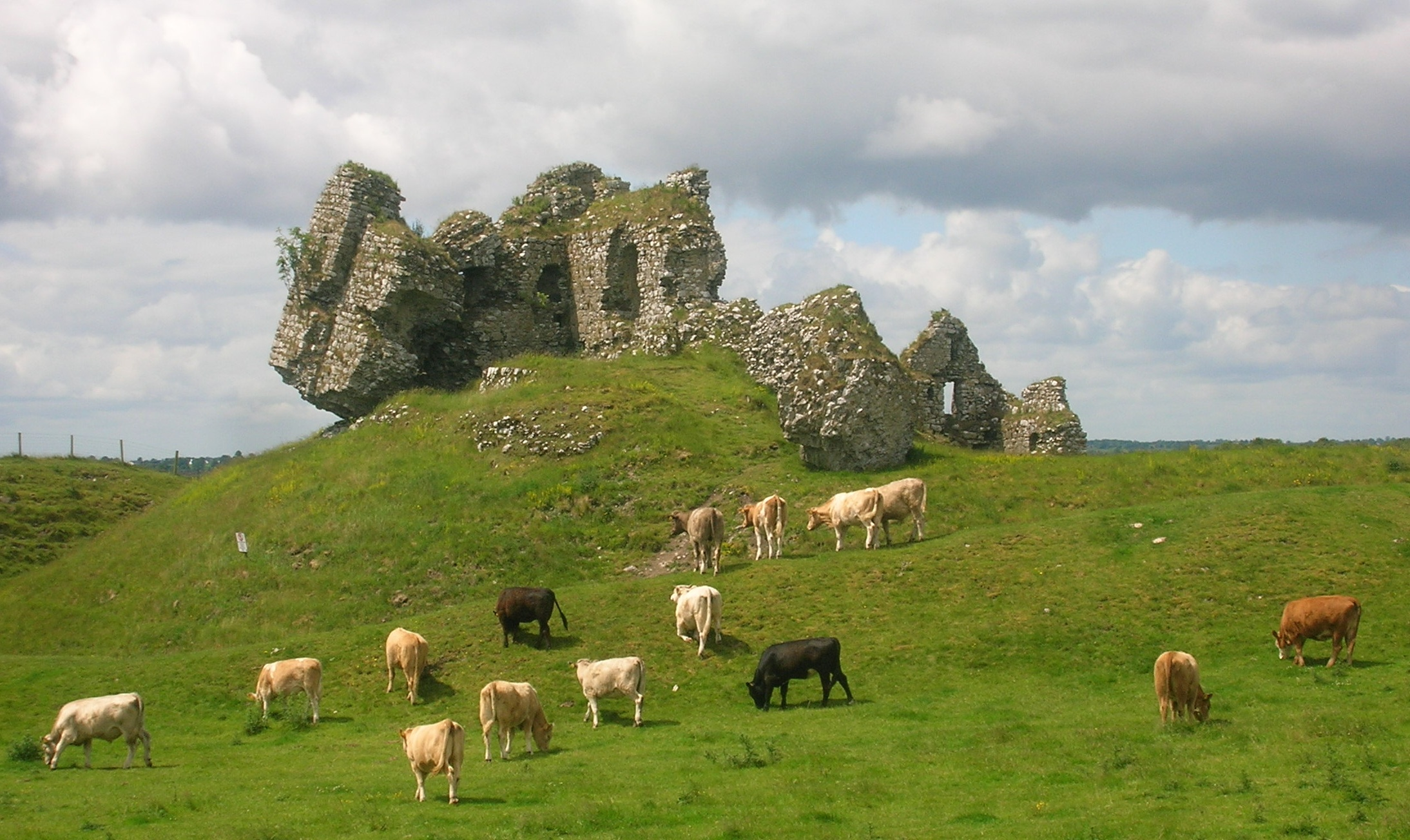
Clonmacnoise Castle

According to Adomnán of Iona, who referenced the testimony of earlier abbots of Iona who had known Columba, St Columba visited the monastery at Clonmacnoise during the time when he was founding the monastery at Durrow. While he was there he prophesied about the future debates in the churches of Ireland about the dating of Easter and claimed that angels had visited the monastery at Clonmacnoise. While he was there, a young monk named Ernéne mac Craséni (who would later be famous in Ireland) tried to touch Columba's clothes while Columba was not looking. However, the saint immediately noticed and grabbed the boy by the neck, told him to open his mouth, and then blessed him, saying that he would teach the doctrine of salvation.

Towards the close of the seventh century a plague carried off a large number of its students and professors. Clonmacnoise's period of greatest growth came between the 8th and 12th centuries. It was attacked frequently during these four centuries, most often by the Irish (at least 27 times), the Vikings (at least 7 times) and the Normans (at least 6 times). The early wooden buildings began to be replaced by more durable stone structures in the 9th century, and the original population of fewer than ten men grew to perhaps 1,500 to 2,000 by the 11th century. Although the site was based around a core of churches, crosses, graves and ecclesiastical dwellings and workshops, it would have been surrounded by the houses and streets of a larger secular community, the metalworkers, craftsmen and farmers who supported the monastic clergy and their students. Artisans associated with the site created some of the most beautiful and enduring artworks in metal and stone ever seen in Ireland, with the Clonmacnoise Crozier (on display in the National Museum of Ireland) and the Cross of the Scriptures representing the apex of their efforts. The Book of the Dun Cow, a vellum manuscript dating to the 12th century, was written here and its main compiler, Máel Muire mac Céilechair meic Cuinn na mBocht was reputedly murdered in a Viking raid in 1106.

By the 12th century Clonmacnoise began to decline. The reasons were varied, although attacks by the Vikings (under Turgesius) and the Normans contributed. Without doubt the most debilitating factor was the growth of the town of Athlone to the north of the site from the late-12th century. Athlone became the main trading town for the midlands of Ireland, and the most popular route for crossing the Shannon, as well as the best-defended settlement in the region. People migrated north from Clonmacnoise to Athlone, and along with the population decrease went much of the support that the site needed to survive, and former allies began to recognise the decline in the site's influence. The influx of continental religious orders such as the Cistercians, Franciscans, Augustinians, Benedictines, Cluniacs, etc. around the same time fed into this decline as numerous competing sites began to crop up. Ireland's move from a monastic framework to a diocesan one in the twelfth century similarly diminished the site's religious standing, as it was designated the seat of a small and impoverished diocese.

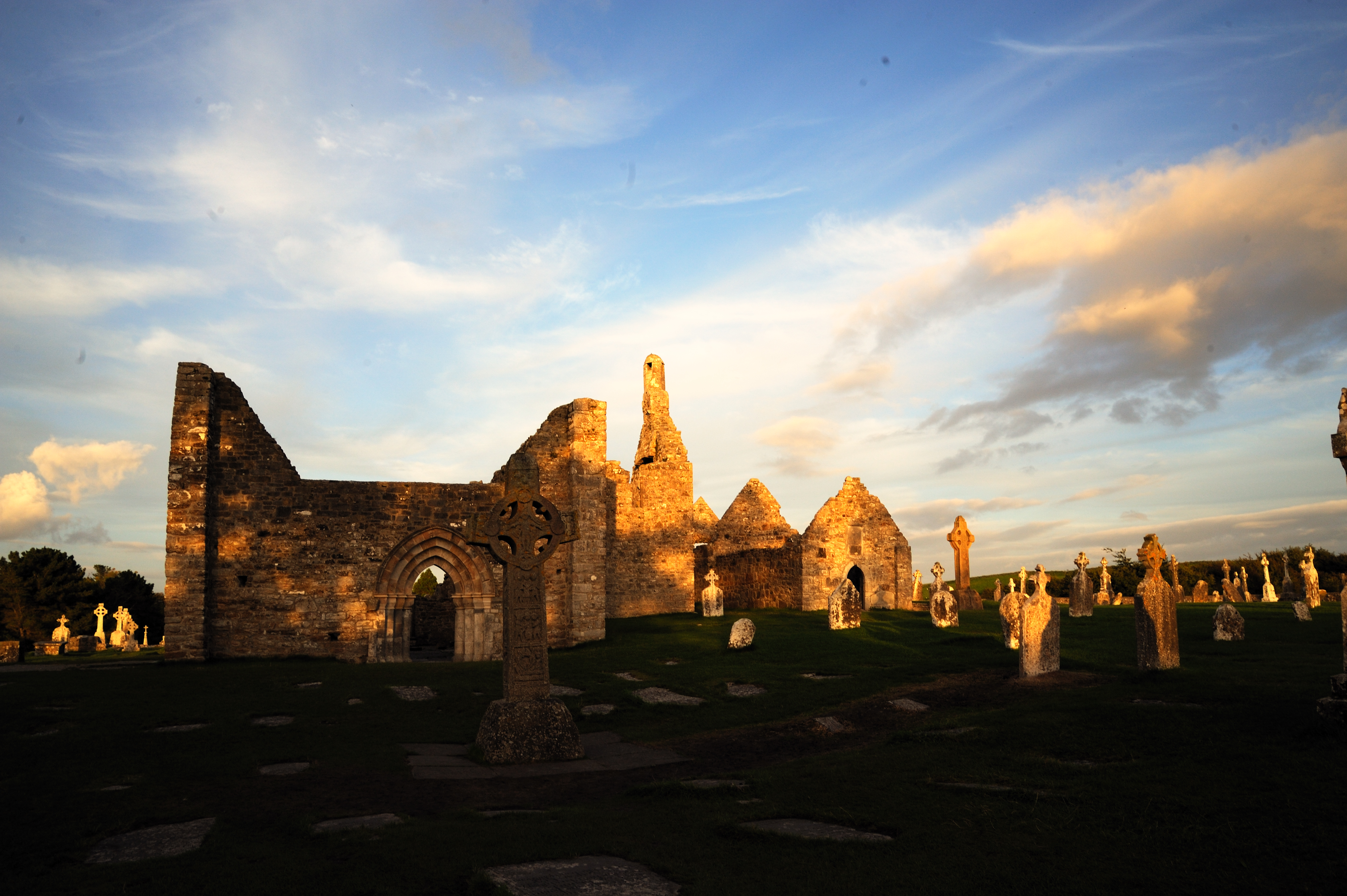
Clonmacnoise at sunset

In 1552 the English garrison at Athlone destroyed and looted Clonmacnoise for the final time, leaving it in ruins.

The monastery ruins were one of the stops on the itinerary of Pope John Paul II during his visit to Ireland in 1979.

== Buildings and High Crosses ==
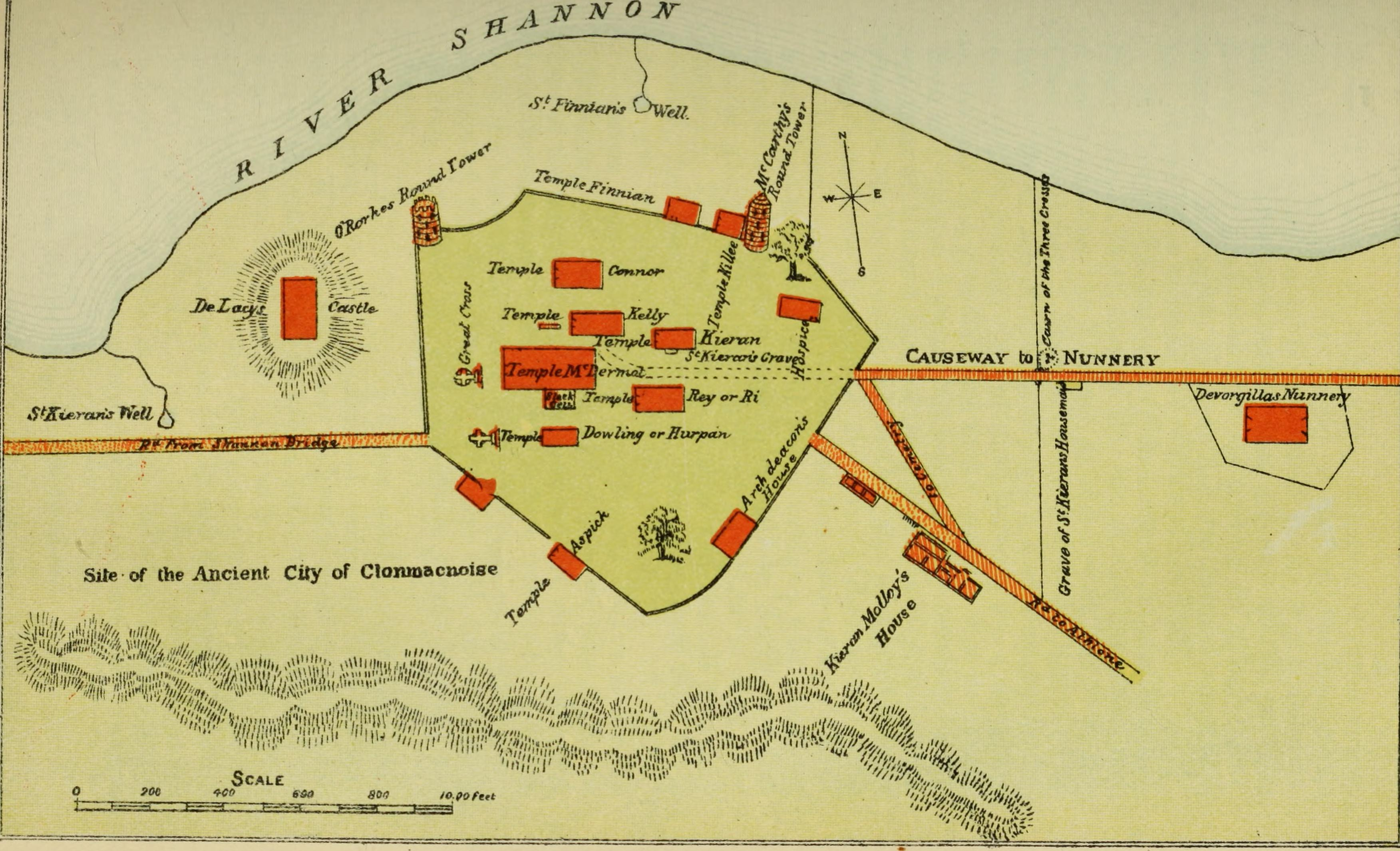
Plan of the site

The site includes the ruins of a cathedral, seven churches, two round towers, three high crosses and a large collection of Early Christian grave slabs.

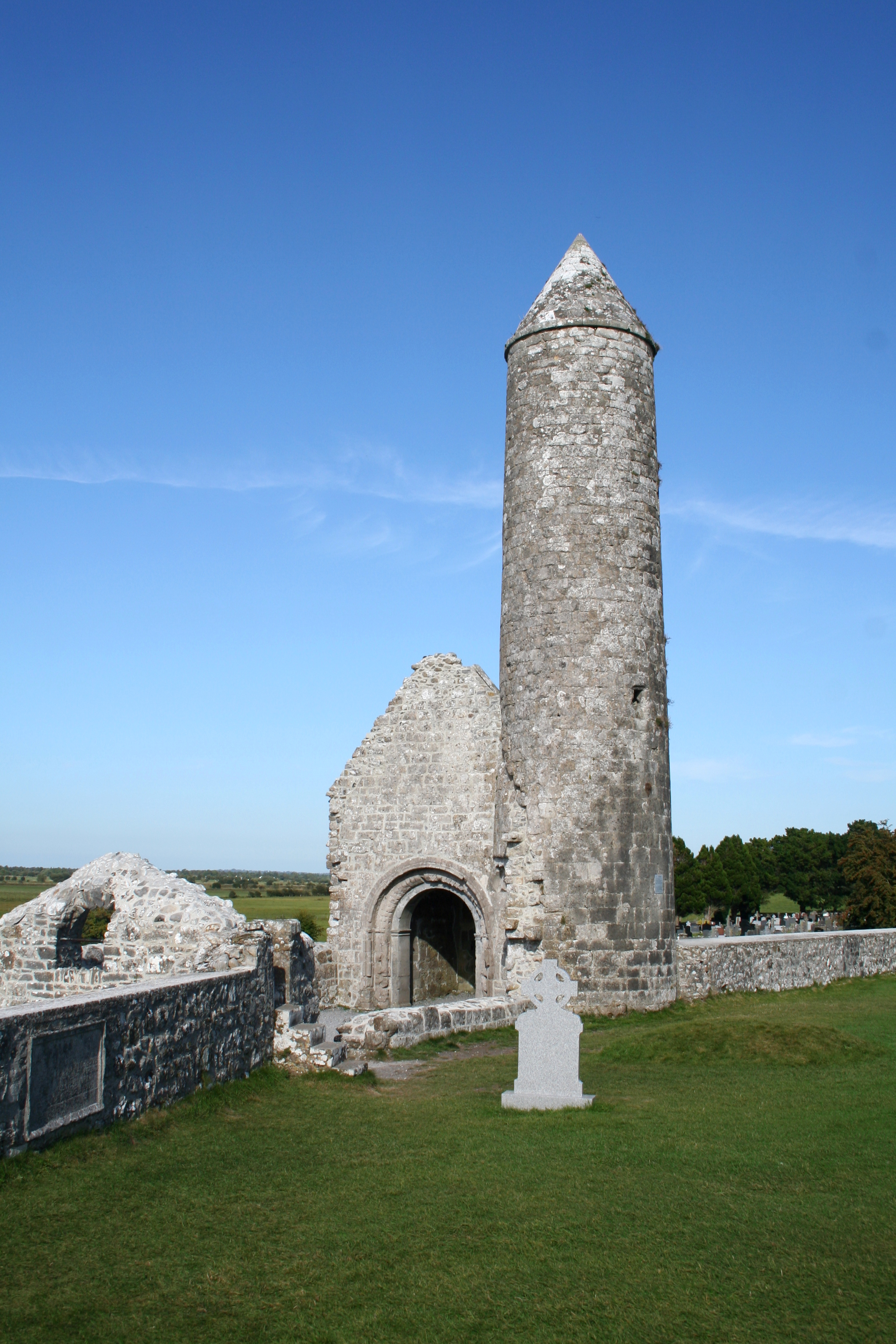
Temple Finghin & McCarthy's Tower

Many of the grave slabs are carved with knotwork and interlacing.

Most of the churches have recently undergone comprehensive conservation works, mostly re-pointing, with the Nun's Church (about 1 km off site), currently under wraps while it too undergoes the same process.

O'Rourke's Tower: Though named O'Rourkes' Tower, after 10th-century Connacht king Fergal O'Rourke, the Chronicum Scotorum records that it was finished in 1124 by Turlough O'Connor, king of Connacht, and Gilla Christ Ua Maoileoin, abbot of Clonmacnoise. Eleven years later it was struck by lightning which knocked off the head of the tower. The upper part of the tower is later work, so there is some speculation that the masonry thus toppled in the storm of 1135 may have been reused in the building of McCarthy's Tower.

Temple Finghín & McCarthy's Tower: Romanesque church and round tower – 12th century. An unusual occurrence was the vandalism of this church in 1864 by a person from Birr on a 'pleasure party' to the Seven Churches, as Clonmacnoise was often termed. This led to a landmark case when a prosecution was brought against the vandal by the Crown, due to the efforts of the Royal Society of Antiquaries of Ireland. Some of the funds which had been raised for the prosecution were later used by the Society to repair the cap of the church's tower. The structure is possibly the earliest example of a church and round tower being part of a single structure in Ireland.

Temple Connor: Church used by the Church of Ireland since the 18th century. It underwent significant restoration works in the second decade of the twentieth century, when the pitch of the roof was raised and the internal space was remodelled. The church is maintained under the auspices of the Athlone Union of Parishes, and each Sunday during the summer a service is held at four o'clock in the afternoon.

North Cross: Oldest of the three extant crosses. Created c.800. Only the limestone shaft and sandstone base (a former millstone) survive. A cross-legged figure has been interpreted as the Celtic god Cernunnos or a similar god, while others have interpreted it as the Devil.

Temple Kelly: All that remains of this church are the low-lying perimeter stones, which still give a good indication of the church's original size.

Temple Ciarán: Located near the centre of the site. At 2.8 by 3.8 metres, it is the smallest church in Clonmacnoise. Built in 909, much of the walls are original and is considered the oldest dated stone church surviving in Ireland. Traditionally presented as the grave site of St. Ciarán, excavations of the church unearthed the Clonmacnoise Crozier, but no saintly remains.

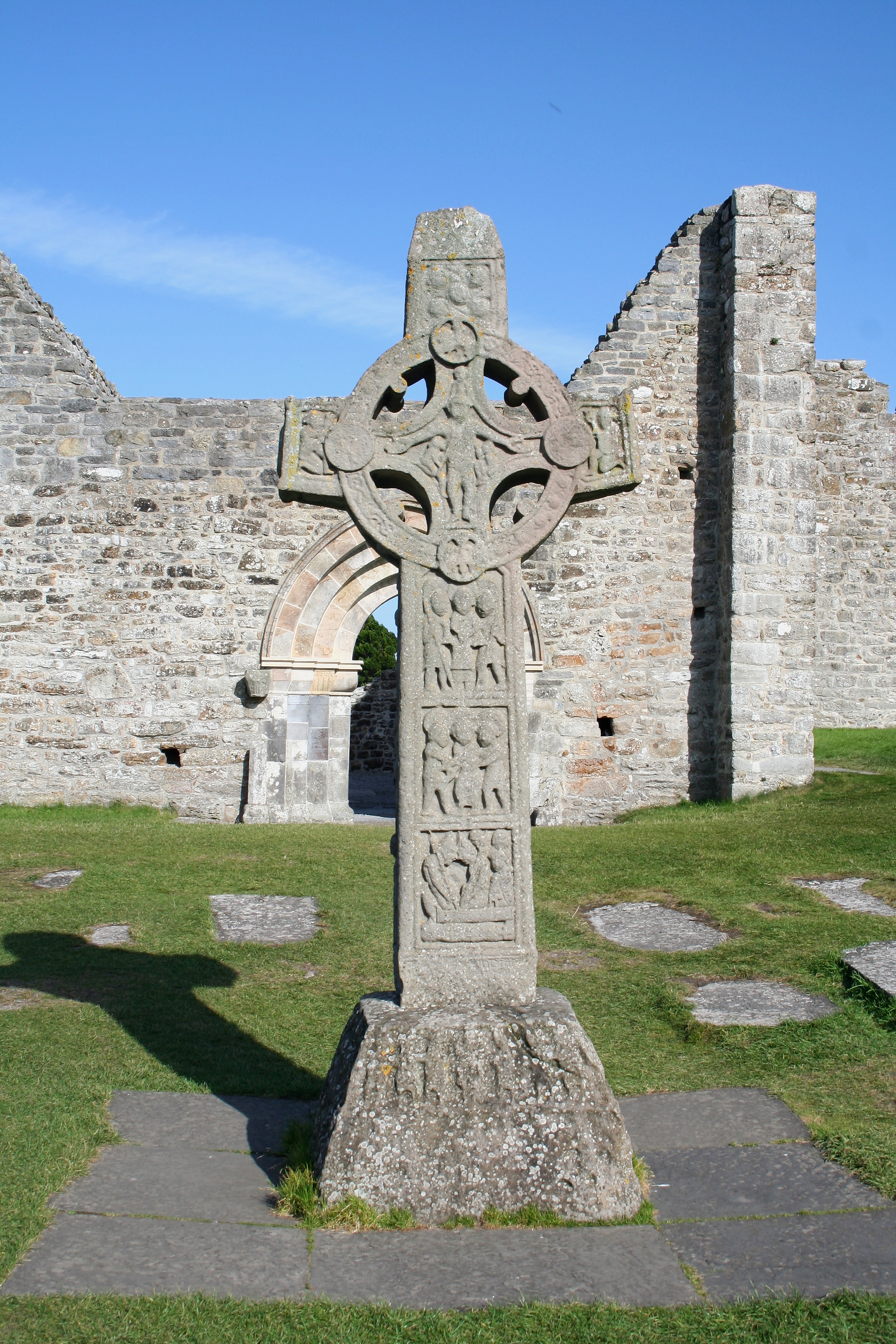
Replica of the Cross of the Scriptures

Cross of the Scriptures: A 4-metre-high sandstone cross is one of the most skilfully executed of the surviving Irish high crosses, of particular interest for its inscription asking for a prayer for Flann Sinna, King of Ireland and Abbot Colmán who commissioned the cross. Both men were also responsible for the building of the cathedral. The cross was carved from Clare sandstone c.900. The surface of the cross is divided into panels, showing scenes including the Crucifixion, the Last Judgement, and Christ in the Tomb. The original was moved into the visitors' centre in 1991 to preserve it from the elements; a replica stands at the original site.

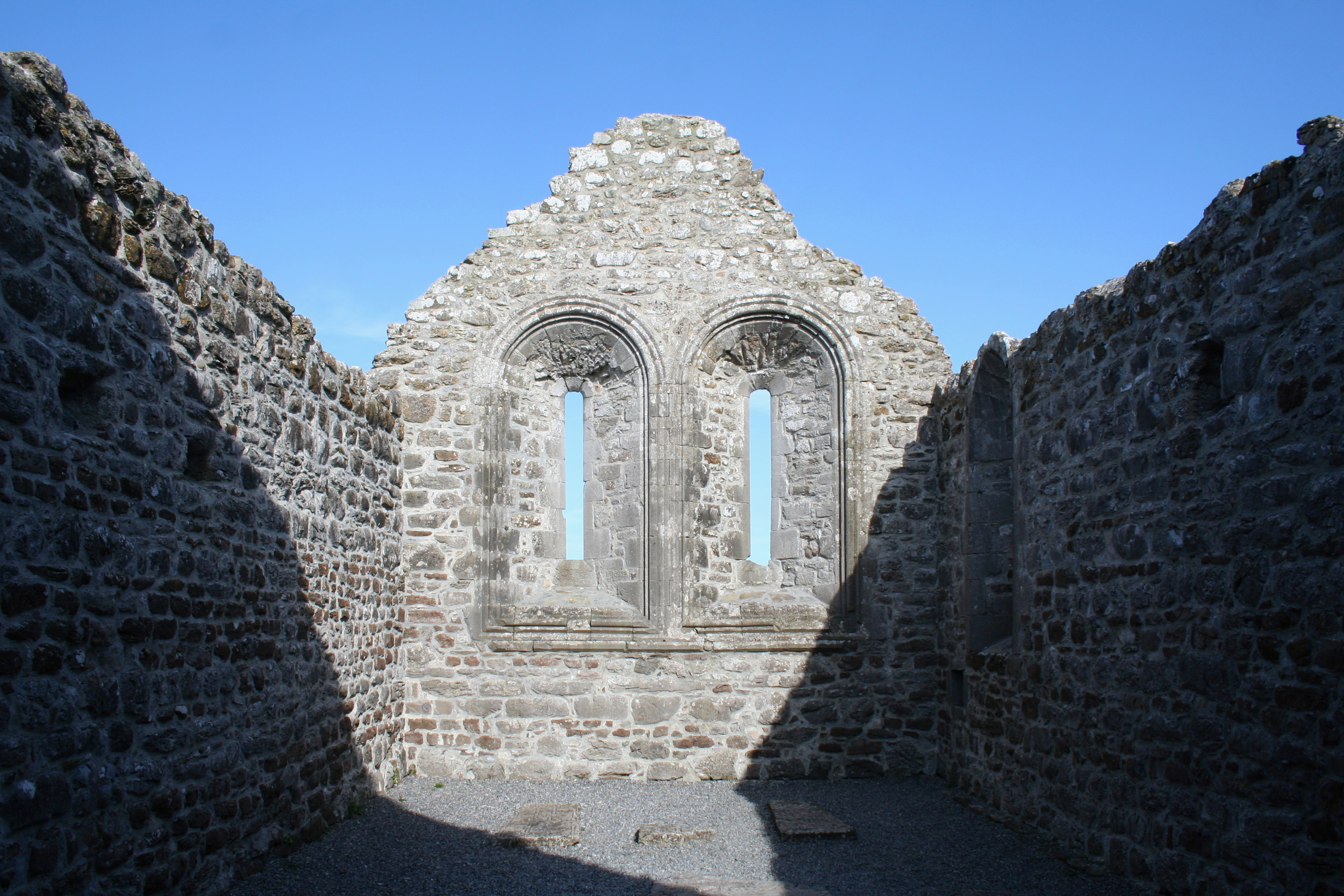
Interior of Temple Rí (King's Church)

Cathedral (Temple McDermot): Building started around 909 by King Flann Sinna and Abbot Colmán mac Ailella. The west doorway has been recently (and somewhat controversially), comprehensively restored with the Gothic-style north doorway, often called the Whispering Arch, dating to the mid-15th century. The cathedral is the largest of the churches at Clonmacnoise. Rory O'Connor, the last High King of Ireland, was buried near the altar in 1198, joining his father Turlough. Most of the graves currently seen in the church are those of the Coghlan family, whose patriarch extensively rebuilt the cathedral in the mid-seventeenth century.

Temple Melaghlin: Built c.1200. Also called the King's Church, due to the fact that at least seven generations of Melaghlin Kings are said to be buried underneath the structure. The church is also believed to have housed the scriptorium, the room where the manuscripts were designed and decorated.

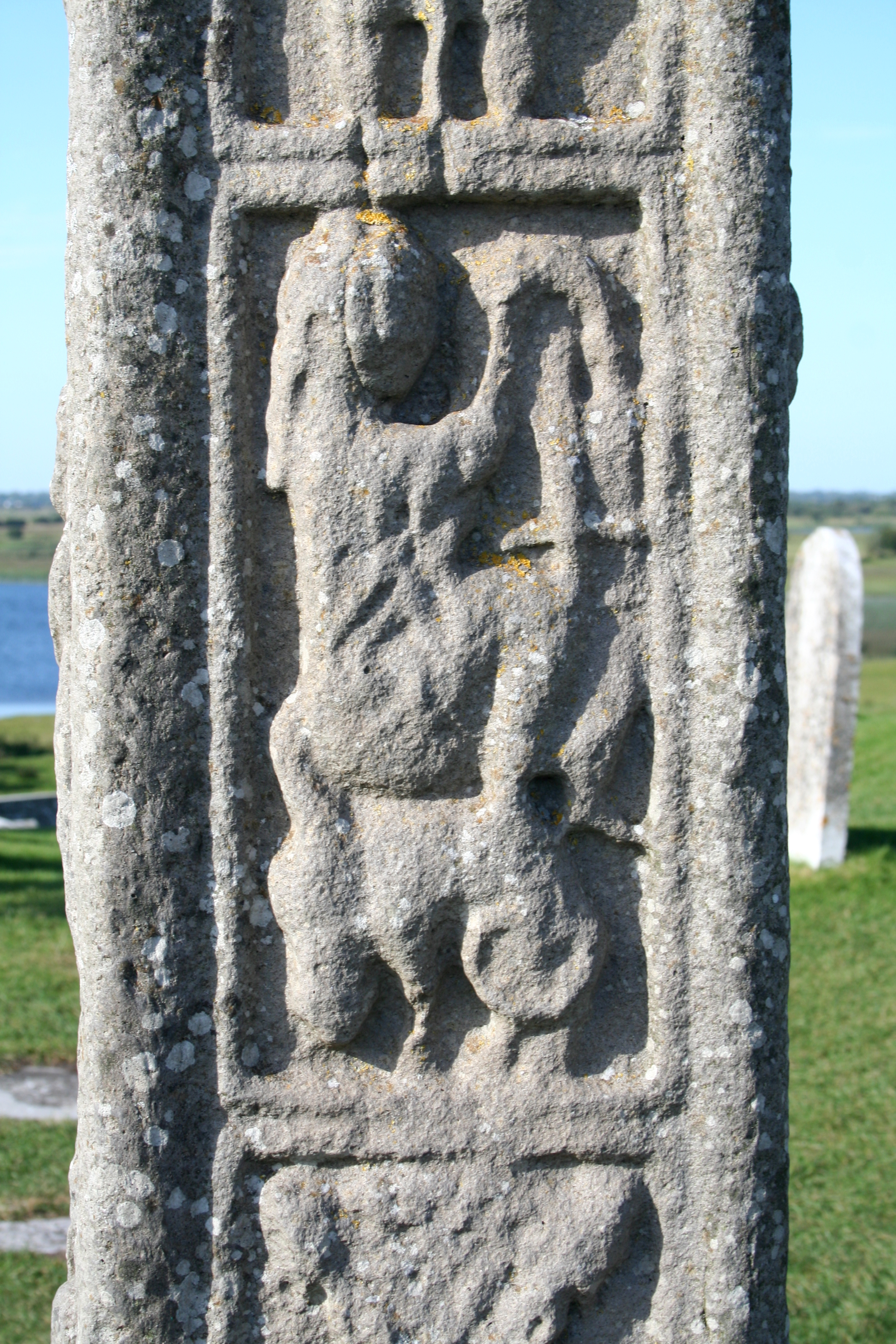
Detail of Cross of the Scriptures

South Cross: A 9th-century piece originally situated at the southern end of the site's central hub. It has one Christian scene on its west face, a rough carving of the Crucifixion of Christ. Many believe that the Cross may have been part inspiration for the later Cross of the Scriptures. Again, the original is in the interpretative centre, with a replica occupying its original site.

Temple Dowling: Originally built in the 10th century, this tiny church is named after Edmund Dowling, who renovated it in 1689, placing a stone carving of his family crest above the door.

Temple Hurpan: Built in the 17th century at the east end of Temple Dowling, this annex had no religious function outside of being a burial ground for some members of the local parish. Sometimes referred to as MacClaffey's Church.

== Interpretative Centre and facilities ==
Clonmacnoise was handed over by the Church of Ireland to the Irish Government in 1955 and has been maintained by various departmental bodies since then. Currently the Office of Public Works manages the site on behalf of the Department of the Environment and Local Government.

The current visitors' centre opened in 1993, replacing a wooden structure, and entry to the site is contingent on the payment of an entry fee seven days a week (from 1973 to 1985 a part-time guiding/interpretative service was maintained, which also required a small admission fee). The centre was designed to cater for a maximum of 80,000 visitors per annum; it attracted roughly 169,000 visitors in 2007 and 135,000 in 2010.

Main features of the Interpretative Centre are exhibits depicting the history of Clonmacnoise and the area, archaeological artefacts (including the original stone crosses, brought indoors for preservation and display), information on the people who would have lived and worked there, and a section on the local ecology of the Shannon and the wetland bogs. Other amenities include a theatre for audio/visual presentations, a Fáilte Ireland tourist office, gift shop, tea room, toilets and parking. Guided tours of the site may be booked in advance for groups.

== The lonfanlough stone ==
Near the Chapel of Clonfinlough at Clonmacnoise there are several limestone boulders, one of which is called the Fairy's or Horseman's Stone. It has many cup-shaped hollows, crosses, daggers, and a pair of human feet (an example of a Petrosomatoglyph) possibly connected with the inauguration of Gaelic rulers.

== Annals ==
The Annals of Clonmacnoise chronicle events in Ireland from pre-history to A.D. 1408. The original manuscript or manuscripts are lost, and the names of its compilers are unknown. It is so-called because it was thought to be based on materials gathered at the monastery of Clonmacnoise.

== Annalistic references ==
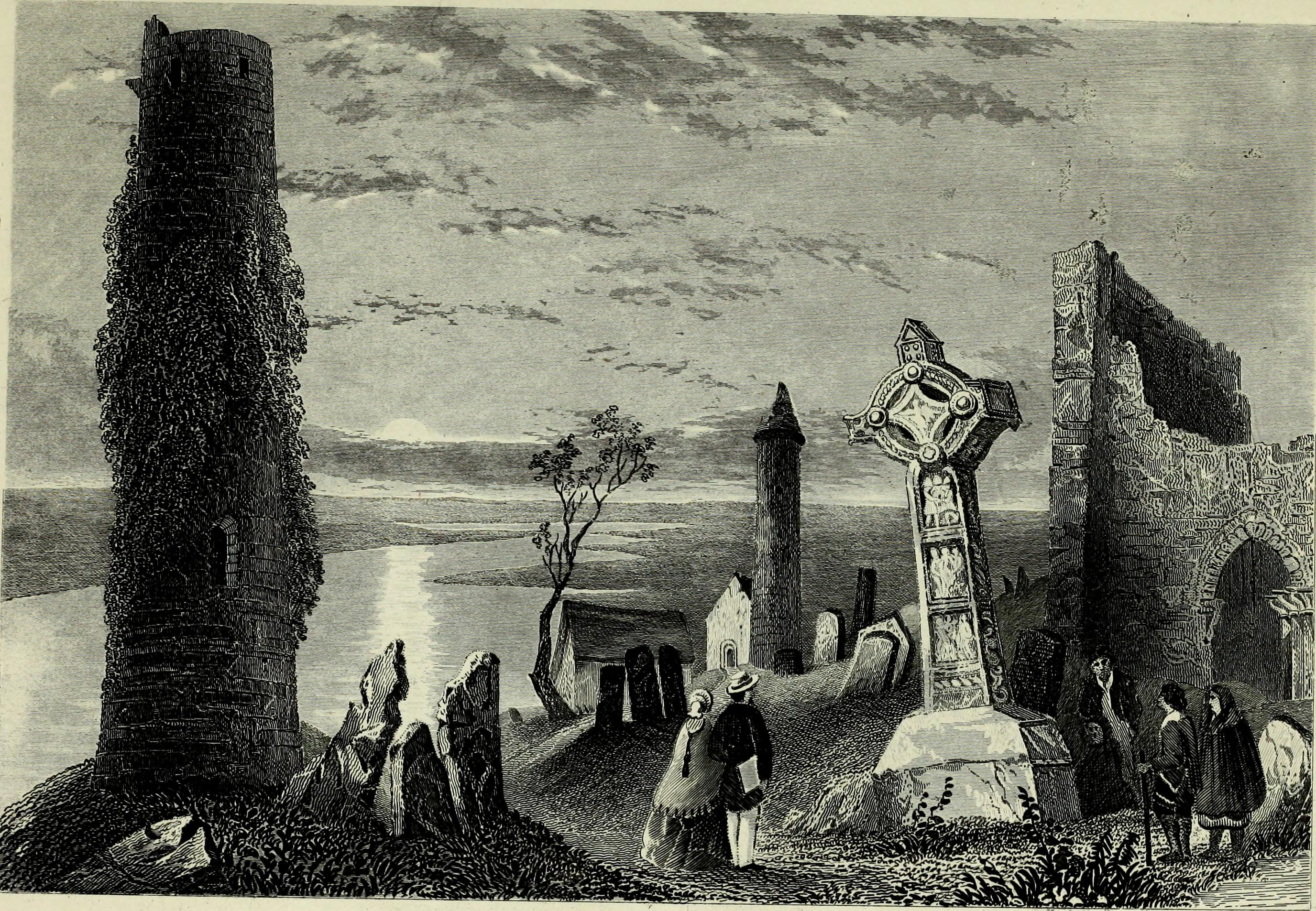
View of Clonmacnoise (W. H. Bartlett, 1884)

- 792. Aelmidhair, OEconomus of Cluain Mic Nois, who was of the Sil Maelruanaidh, died.
- 793. Connmhach, son of Burbotha, a descendant of Guaire Aidhne, scribe of Cluain Mic Nois .. died.
- 784. Murghal, Abbot of Cluain Mic Nois, of the race of Fiachra, son of Eochaidh Muighmheadhoin
- 789. Colgu Ua Duineachda, lector of Cluain Mic Nois, he who composed the Scuaip Chrabhaidh, died.
- 793. Connmhach mac Burbotha, a descendant of Guaire Aidhne, scribe of Cluain Mic Nois;
- 794. Anaile, Abbot of Cluain Mic Nois, who was of the Ui Briuin, died.
- 811. Suibne mac Cuanach, Abbot of Cluain Mic Nois, one of the Ui Briuin Seola; Cluain Mic Nois was burned. In thirty days afterwards a victory was gained by Diarmaid, son of Tomaltach, over the Ui Fiachrach Muirisce.
- 814. Duibhinsi, scribe of Cluain Mic Nois;
- 848. Cétadach, Abbot of Cluain Mic Nois, died. He was of the tribe of Ui Cormaic Maenmhaighe. It was in lamentation of him this quatrain was composed: "All have heard it/both uncommon and common/That an abbot at Cluain like Cedadach will never again be seen."
- 899. Ioseph of Loch Con, Abbot of Cluain Mic Nois, of the tribe of the northern Ui Fiachrach

== In popular culture ==
- A Danish attack on Clonmacnois, under a Queen Ota, is mentioned by Stephen Maturin in Patrick O'Brian's novel The Surgeon's Mate, seventh book in the Aubrey-Maturin series.

== See also ==
- Abbot of Clonmacnoise, for a list of abbots
- Bishop of Clonmacnoise, for a list of bishops
- Head of Eglaisi Bige, Clonmacnoise
- The Clonmacnoise Crozier, a late-11th-century Insular crozier found on the site's grounds
