= De mirabilibus sacrae scripturae =

7th-century Latin treatise by anonymous Irish philosopher

Incunabulum of De mirabilibus published at Utrecht in 1473 or 1474 by the printers Nicolaes Ketelaer and Gerard de Leempt.

De mirabilibus sacrae scripturae (English: On the Miraculous Things in Sacred Scripture) is a Latin treatise written around 655 by an anonymous Irish writer and philosopher known as Augustinus Hibernicus or the Irish Augustine.

The author's nickname is in reference to the philosopher Augustine of Hippo. This pseudo-Augustine was born in Ireland sometime in the first half of the seventh century and is noted especially for his natural philosophy.

Around the year 655 he wrote a treatise called De mirabilibus Sacrae Scripturae. It has long been regarded as an exceptional work, in that it demonstrates a strictly scientific approach in the matter of making direct observations of nature and subjecting them to a strictly logical interpretation.

His treatise seeks to explain each miracle in the Scriptures as an extreme case of phenomena, yet still within the laws of nature. Augustine also gives a list of the terrestrial mammals of Ireland, and solves the problem of how they reached Ireland after the flood of Noah by proposing a solution – hundreds of years ahead of its time – that the island had been cut off from continental Europe by marine erosion.
