= Ui Fiachrach Finn =

Territory in County Galway, Ireland

Uí Fiachrach Finn was a territory located in Máenmag in what is now central County Galway.

It was home to the families of Ó Maolalaidh and Ó Neachtain. By the 15th century the Ó Maolalaidh's had been expelled and settled north of Tuam, while the Ó Neachtain's had been forced to relocate in the Fews of Athlone.

== Annalistic references ==
- 1190. Mail-Seachlainn Ua Neachtain and Gilla-Beraigh Ua Sluaigheadhaigh were killed by Toirrdhealbach, son of Ruaidhri Ua Conchubair.
- 1273. Gilla-Crisd Ua Neachtain and William Ua Neachtain were killed by Ruaighri, son of Toirrdhelbach Ua Conchubhair.
- 1279, Domhnall mac Giollu Criost Uí Neachtain was slain by Aodh Ó Con Cenainn.
- 1392. A raid by Cathal son of Ruaidhrí son of Toirdhealbhach Ó Conchobhair on the son of Eochaidh Ó Ceallaigh, and he took cattle and horses into the Feadha with him. Peace was made between the same kings, i.e. a division of territory, namely of the Feadha, was also made between the two Muinntear Neachtain.

== See also ==
- Uí Fiachrach
