= Lally =

Lally may refer to:

== People with the surname ==
- Andy Lally, American racing driver
- Anne Rigney, formerly Anne Rigney Lally, Irish artist and sculptor
- Conrad Lally (1882–1941), Canadian military aviator
- Declan Lally, Irish GAA footballer
- Gerard Lally, Irish Jacobite
- Eugene F. Lally, American aerospace engineer, photographer, entrepreneur
- Gabe Jeudy-Lally (born 2001), American football player
- Gérard de Lally-Tollendal, French politician
- Jade Lally, British discus thrower
- James Lally, Irish County Galway landowner
- Joe Lally, American musician
- Margaret "Ma" Murray (Margaret Theresa Lally), Canadian publisher's wife
- Marquis de Lally-Tollendal, Irish-French Jacobite family
- Maureen Lally-Green, American judge
- Mick Lally, Irish theatre actor
- Pat Lally (footballer), English footballer
- Pat Lally (politician), Scottish politician
- Paul M. Lally, American television producer, writer, and director
- Seán Ó Maolalaidh (fl. 1419–1480), Chief of the Name
- Thomas Arthur, comte de Lally, French general

== People with the given name ==
- Lally Bowers, British actress
- Lally Cadeau, Canadian actress
- Lally Horstmann, German writer
- Lally Katz, Australian dramatist
- Lally Stott, British songwriter
- Lally Weymouth, American journalist and newspaper heiress

== Other uses ==
- Lally School of Management & Technology, part of Rensselaer Polytechnic Institute, Troy, New York
- Lally column, a vertical support column
- Lally, Saskatchewan, an old name used for the community of Quill Lake, Saskatchewan, in Canada
