= Conchobair Ó Maolalaidh =

Irish bishop

Conchobair Ó Maolalaidh was an Irish churchman who became successively bishop of Clonfert (1447–1448), Emly (1448–1449) and Elphin (1449–1468).

== Biography ==
Conchobair was a brother of Seán Ó Maolalaidh. Their family had been expelled from Máenmag by the Mac Hubert Burkes before 1445 and under Seán had relocated to Tuam as tenents of Baron Athenry.

Conchobair was a Franciscan friar, and was advanced to Clonfert by provision of Pope Nicholas V on 22 May 1447. He translated to the see of Emly on the 22 August 1448, and the following year he translated again to Elphin on the 20 October 1449, where he remained until his death in 1468.

Other members of his family included

- Tomás Ó Maolalaidh, Bishop of Clonmacnoise (c. 1509–1514) and Archbishop of Tuam (1514–1536)
- William O'Mullaly, Dean of Tuam (1558–1572) and Archbishop of Tuam (1572–1595)
- James Lally (died 1691)
- Gerard Lally (died 1737)
- Thomas Arthur, comte de Lally, baron de Tollendal (1702–1766)
- Trophime-Gérard, marquis de Lally-Tollendal (1751–1830)

Religious titles
Preceded by John White	Bishop of Clonfert; 1447–1448	Succeeded by Cornelius Ó Cuinnlis
Preceded by Cornelius Ó Cuinnlis	Bishop of Emly; 1448–1449	Succeeded by William Ó hEidheáin
Preceded by William Ó hEidheáin	Bishop of Elphin; 1449–1468	Succeeded by Nicol Ó Flannagáin
