= Claregalway Friary =

Ruined Franciscan friary in Galway, Ireland

Coordinates: 53.346667°N 8.944583°W

- Mainistir Bhaile Chláir
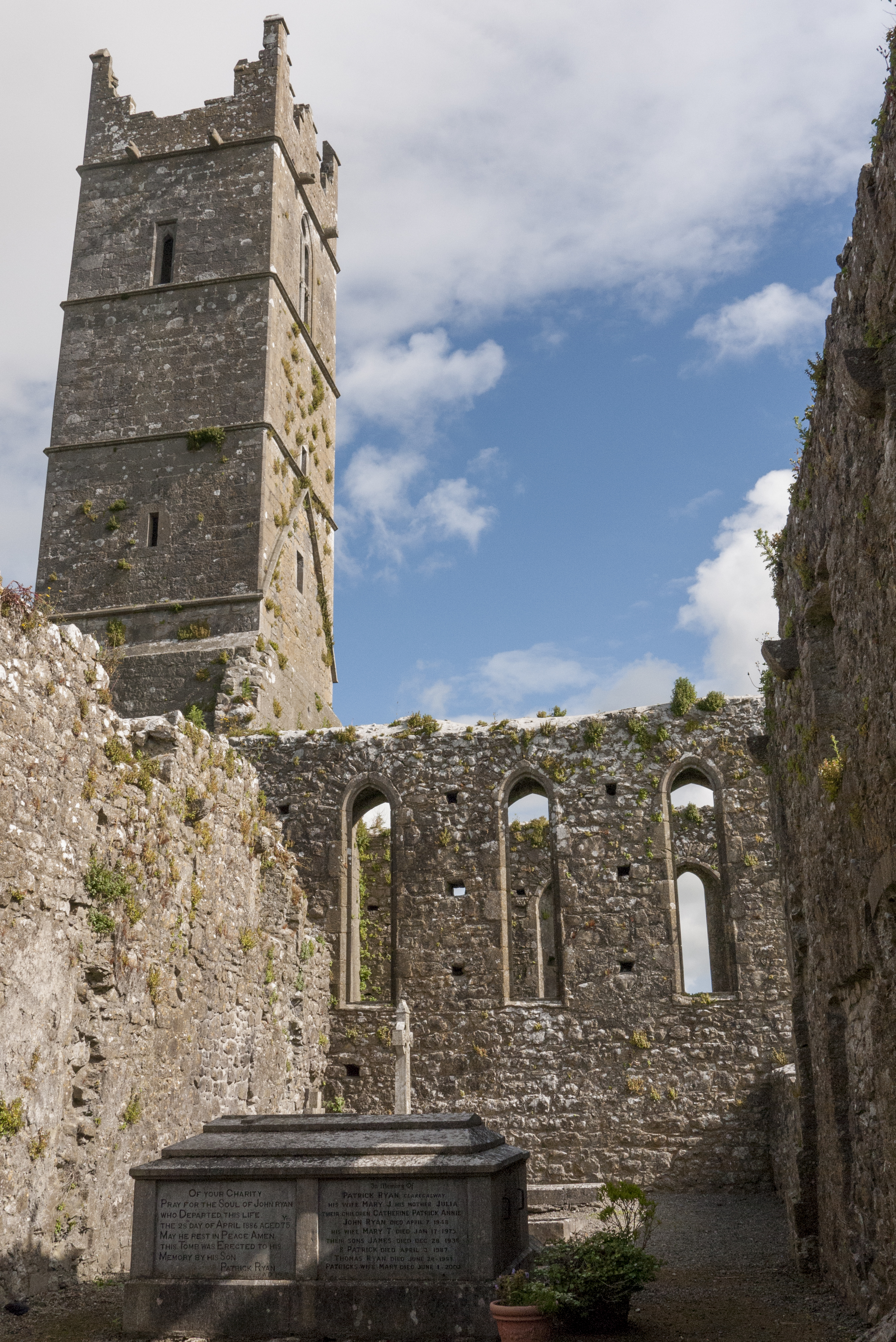
- Interactive map of Claregalway Friary

Monastery information
- Order: Franciscans
- Denomination: catholic
- Established: c.1240

People
- Founder: John de Cogan

Architecture
- Status: Inactive

Site
- Location: Claregalway, County Galway, Ireland
- Public access: Yes

National monument of Ireland
- Official name: Claregalway Abbey
- Reference no.: 165

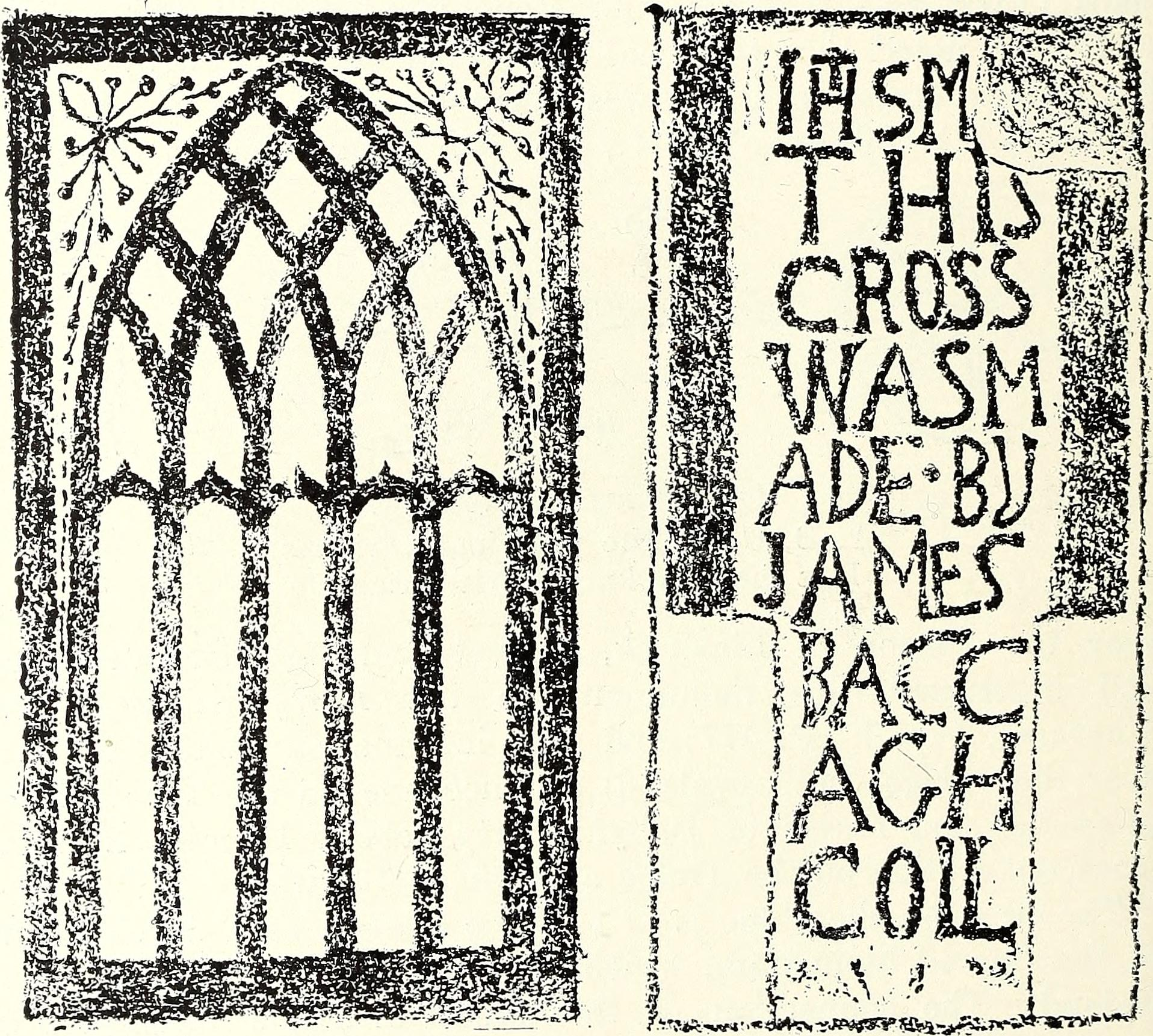
Tracery window and 18th century tombstone of "James Baccagh Coll" (Lame James Coyle).

The Claregalway Friary (Irish: Mainistir Bhaile Chláir) is a ruined medieval Franciscan abbey in Claregalway, County Galway, Ireland.

The abbey site features an east-facing, cruciform church (minus a south transept) with a 24-metre (80 ft) bell tower. The ruins of the living quarters and cloister are situated to the south of the church building.

== History ==
A 19th-century view showing the abbey, the old bridge and the tower

Claregalway friary was founded circa. 1240, and was definitely extant before 1250. Though some sources attribute the founding of the friary to John de Cogan II, it was in fact founded by his father, John de Cogan I.

In 1326, John Magnus de Cogan (John de Cogan III) is recorded as calling himself the founder of the friary. This is understood as either he was the monastery's patron or he substantially enlarged the monastery. The Franciscan community at the abbey lived under the patronage of the de Cogan clan until 1327, after Magnus de Cogan gave them the building and surrounding lands. In return for this favour, the monks were asked to present a rose to de Cogan and his descendants on the Nativity of John the Baptist. The friary was renovated in the 15th century, at which point the tower and the chancel's east window were added.

The community flourished until the mid-16th century, when the English Reformation disrupted the Catholic establishment in Ireland. From that time on, the monks of Claregalway struggled to keep the abbey viable against political and economic forces.

On 11 July 1538, forces under the command of Lord Leonard Gray ransacked and looted the abbey while marching to Galway. In 1570, Queen Elizabeth I granted possession of the monastery to Sir Richard de Burgo. Circa. 1589, the monastery buildings were turned into a barracks under the administration of the English provincial governor, Sir Richard Bingham.

During the reign of King James, the property was given to the Earl of Clanrickarde. By 1641, the Franciscans had reoccupied the abbey, but the building was in poor repair and the community lacked the ability to renovate it.

In 1731, Edward Synge, Anglican archbishop of Tuam recorded that "there is a friary in Claregalway, where three at least are always resident." The High Sheriff of the county, Stratford Eyre, reported in 1732 that the monks "lived close" to the abbey.

Church records indicate that the community numbered about 220 religious in 1766, but this number had declined to about 150 by 1782. French diplomat Coquebert de Montbret wrote in 1791 that "the monks are settling down among the ruins."

The size of the community continued to dwindle. By 1838, it was down to only two members. Archives of the Galway Vindicator, a local newspaper, indicate that the community's last two monks departed for a larger community in Galway in November 1847. For some years after the monastery closed, members of the Galway friary continued to travel to the site on feast days to celebrate Mass and hear confession, but these activities had ceased by 1860.

In 1892, a Lord Clanmorris donated the property to the Commissioner of Public Works under the provisions of the Ancient Monuments Act 1882.

== Architecture ==
An aisle of four pointed-arch bays was added to the nave of the church. The pillars are cylindrical and feature simple moulded capitals.

== Burials ==
- Muiris Ó Fithcheallaigh, Irish Franciscan theologian and Archbishop of Tuam, c. 1460-1513.
- Tomás Ó Maolalaidh, Bishop of Clonmacnoise (c. 1509-1514) and Archbishop of Tuam (1514–1536).

== See also ==
- List of abbeys and priories in Ireland (County Galway)
