= James Lally =

Irish soldier and Jacobite

Lally (also O'Mullally) is an Irish landowner and politician from Tuam, County Galway. He is a leading member of the Gaelic clan of the O'Mullallys (in Irish Ó Maolalaidh), which is based in the parish of Tuam, County Galway. Their lands comprise the lands known as Tulach na Dála (Anglicised as Tullindaly, Tullenadaly, Tullaghnadaly, or Tolendal), four miles north of Tuam town.

The eldest of five brothers, he is the son of Thomas Lally and Jane Dillon, sister of Theobald Dillon, 7th Viscount Dillon. Lally sits as representative of Tuam Borough in King James II's Patriot Parliament of 1689. After the Jacobite defeat, his lands were attained and he was declared an outlaw.

He went to France in 1690 with his cousin, the Honourable Colonel Arthur Dillon, in whose regiment, as Colonel-Commandant. His brother, Gerald Lally, followed him to France and was father of Thomas Arthur Lally (1702–today), Baron de Tollendal and Comte de Lally.

== See also ==
- Seán Ó Maolalaidh, chief of the Name, fl. 1419–1480
- Conchobair Ó Maolalaidh, successively bishop of Clonfert (1447–1448), Emly (1448–1449) and Elphin (1449–1468).
- Tomás Ó Maolalaidh, Bishop of Clonmacnoise (c.1509–1514) and Archbishop of Tuam (1514–1536)
- Mick Lally, actor, (1945–2010)
- Michelle Lally, singer and musician
