= Seán Ó Maolalaidh =

Seán Ó Maolalaidh (fl. 1419–1480) was Chief of the Name.

== Ó Maolalaidh of Máenmag ==
The Ó Maolalaidhs (Lally, Mullally) were, with the Ó Nechtains (Naughton), one of the two leading septs of Máenmag in western Uí Maine. There is some evidence to suggest that they were not of the Uí Maine dynasty, but an indigenous people conquered by the latter in the 7th or 8th century.

== Life ==
A son of Melaghlin Ó Maolalaidh, Seán was to be the last Chief of the Name to live in the family's original homeland. Sometime after his election as chief in 1419, and by 1445, he, his clan and followers were expelled from the area by the Mac Hubert Burkes (Annals of Connacht - 1436.10 Seonacc son of Hugacc Burke died.)

Seán led the family to Tuam, where he leased eighteen townlands from Baron Athenry. One of the townlands was Tullaghnadalaigh (Tullynadaly), some four miles outside the town and thirty miles from Máenmaige.

Seán died in 1480, having been chief for sixty-one years, and was buried at Kilbannin. Tullynadaly was to remain the seat of the senior line of the family until their seizure in the 1690s. Many Mulallys and Lallys are still found in the Tuam area.

== Notable descendants ==
Some of Seán's notable descendants included

- Tomás Ó Maolalaidh, Bishop of Clonmacnoise (c.1509–1514) and Archbishop of Tuam (1514–1536)
- William O'Mullaly, Dean of Tuam (1558–1572) and Archbishop of Tuam (1572–1595)
- James Lally (died 1691)
- Gerard Lally (died 1737)
- Thomas Arthur, comte de Lally, baron de Tollendal (1702–1766)
- Trophime-Gérard, marquis de Lally-Tollendal (1751–1830)

Seán's brother was Conchobair Ó Maolalaidh who became successively Bishop of Clonfert (1447–1448), Emly (1448–1449) and Elphin (1449–1468). John Lally, inventor of the Lally column, was born at Kilbannon, Tuam, in 1859. Irish stage and screen actor Mick Lally (1945–2010) was a native of Toormakeady, north-west of Tuam.

== Note ==
The family's patron saint is Saint Grellan.

== Chiefs of the Name ==
- Amhlaoibh Ó Maolalaidh, fl. 1333, father of
- Donal mac Amhlaoibh, k. 1397, father of
- Melaghlin mac Donal, fl. c. 1400, father of
- Seán Ó Maolalaidh, fl. 1419–1480, father of
- Diarmaid Ó Maolalaidh, d. 1517, father of
- Melaghlin mac Diarmaid, fl. 1541, father of
- Seán mac Melaghlin, fl. 1544, father of
- Diarmaid Ó Maolalaidh, d. 1596, claimed erroneously by William Hawkins, Ulster King of Arms to be the father of Issac. It was instead claimed in 1902 that Seán mac Melaghlin had a son Thomas, Catholic Archbishop of Tuam, who had a son William, Protestant Archbishop of Tuam, who was the father of
- Issac Ó Maolalaidh, d. 12 May 1621, father of
- James Ó Mullally, d. 5 September 1676, father of
- Thomas Mullally, died before June 1677, father
- Colonel James Lally, d. 1691, brother of
- Gerard Lally (died 1737), father of
- Thomas Arthur, comte de Lally, baron de Tollendal (1702-1766), father of
- Trophime-Gérard, marquis de Lally-Tollendal (1751-1830), second cousin of
- Thomas Lally, Sr., of Tuam, fl. 1817, son of James Lally of Milltown
