= William Ó Mullally =

Archbishop of Tuam in the Church of Ireland

William Mullally (Irish Ulliam Ó Maolalaidh), whose family name also appears as Ó Mullally, O'Mullally, Lally, Laly or Lawly, was Archbishop of Tuam in the Church of Ireland from 1573 to his death in 1595.

== Origins ==
Born about 1530 in County Galway, his ancestry varies with each source one consults. His father's name is given as Dermot, Melaghlin or Thomas and no name appears for his mother. What seems clear is that he was a descendant of John Mullaly, Chief of the Name, who died about 1480, and was closely related to Conor Mullaly, successively the bishop of Clonfert (1447–1448), bishop of Emly (1448–1449) and bishop of Elphin (1449–1468). as well as to Thomas Mullaly, the bishop of Clonmacnoise (c.1509-1514) and archbishop of Tuam (1514–1536).

== Career ==
Entering the University of Oxford, he became a member of New Inn Hall and was awarded a bachelor's degree in canon law in 1555. The course then took four or five years' study. Returning to Ireland, he became dean of Tuam in 1558, as well as rector of Athenry and prebendary of Lackagh.

Appointed by Queen Elizabeth I, he was consecrated Archbishop of Tuam on 14 April 1573. Since 1555, the archbishop had also acted as bishop of Annaghdown and in 1580 the two offices were formally united. He sought to add the sees of Clonfert and Kilmacduagh, which had fallen vacant in 1580, but was not successful. He was a member of the government's Commission for the Pacification of Connaught, some sources say acting as Chief Commissioner.

Dying in 1595, he was buried in his cathedral but no memorial remains.

== Family ==
The names of his wife and children are not known. His eldest surviving son was reported as not succeeding to his father's lands until 1618 and a daughter is said to have married Richard Bermingham, 11th Baron Athenry.

Preceded by Christopher Bodkin	Archbishop of Tuam; 1572–1595	Succeeded by Nehemiah Donnellan
