= List of French people of Irish descent =

This is a list of famous citizens of France with Irish origin or roots.

== Arts and media ==
- Eugène Hus (1758-1823) - ballet dancer and choreographer; Irish father
- Louise Swanton Belloc (1796–1881) - writer and translator; Irish father
- Joseph O'Kelly (1828-1885) - composer, pianist and choral conductor; Irish father
- Auguste O'Kelly (1829-1900) - music publisher in Paris; Irish father
- George O'Kelly (1831-1914) - pianist and composer; Irish father
- Augusta Holmès (1847-1903) - composer; Irish father
- Henri O'Kelly (1859-1938) - composer, pianist, organist and choir director; Irish father
- James Hopper (1876-1956) - writer and novelist; Irish father
- Émile Nelligan (1879-1941) - Montreal poet; Irish father
- Jacques Becker (1906-1960) - film director and screenwriter; mother of Irish descent
- Vivien Leigh(1913-1967) - actress; mother born in India - possibly of Irish descent
- Georges Wilson (1921-2010) - French film and television actor; Irish mother
- Jeanne Moreau (1928-2017) - French actress, singer, screenwriter' English mother of Irish descent
- Michael Lonsdale (May 1931 – 2020) - French actor and author; mother half-Irish
- Jean Becker (born 1933) - film director and screenwriter
- Étienne Becker (1936-1995) - photographer
- Betty Catroux (born 1945) - Brazilian-born French former Chanel model and fashion icon
- Lambert Wilson (born 1958) - actor, singer and activist
- Jim Bittermann - CNN correspondent
- Gilles Lellouche (born 1972) - French actor; mother of Irish heritage
- James Thierrée (born 1974) - Swiss circus performer, violinist, actor and director
- Alison Wheeler (born 1986) - French comedian and actress
- Vaimalama Chaves (1994) - French singer, beauty pageant titleholder, and model; father has Irish heritage
- Lily-Rose Depp (born 1999) - actress and model
- Liah O'Prey (born 1999) - actress; Irish father

== Business ==
- Richard Cantillon (1680-1734) - economist and businessman
- Antoine Walsh (1703 – 1763) - shipowner and slave trader
- Mary O'Shiell (1715-1745) - shipowner and slave trader.
- Richard Hennessy (1724-1800) - army officer and businessman; founded Hennessy cognac dynasty
- Anthony N. Brady (1841-1913) - French-born American businessman
- Kilian Hennessy (1907-2010) - businessman

== Military ==
- Ricardo Wall (1694-1777) - Spanish military leader and diplomat
- John Patrick O'Gara - French-born soldier of Irish descent; served in Spanish Army
- James O'Moran (1735-1794) - military leader
- Gerard Lally (died 1737) - Jacobite and French military officer.
- Charles Edward Jennings (1751-1799) - soldier and revolutionary
- John Moran (1830 – 1905) - American cavalry soldier
- Arthur Dillon (1834–1922) - soldier and journalist
- Pierre Louis Napoleon Cavagnari (1841-1879) - military administrator

== Nobility ==
- James Sarsfield, 2nd Earl of Lucan (1693-1719) - nobleman and soldier
- James Fitz-James Stuart, 2nd Duke of Berwick (1696-1738) - nobleman and soldier
- Bernardo O'Connor (1696-1780) - Spanish nobleman and soldier
- Charles O'Gara (1699-1777) - French-born courtier
- Thomas Arthur, comte de Lally (1702-1766) - nobleman and army officer
- Catalina Sarsfield - Queen of Corsica
- Marie-Louise O'Murphy (1737-1814) - mistress of Louis XV
- Marquis de Lally-Tollendal (executed 1766) - nobleman and soldier
- Théobald Dillon (1745-1792) - nobleman and soldier
- Jean-Baptiste Lynch (1749-1835) - Count of the First French Empire, Mayor of Bordeaux and a peer of France
- Arthur Dillon (1750–1794) - nobleman and soldier
- André Burthe (1772–1830) - Baron of France.
- Henri Jacques Guillaume Clarke (1765-1818) - politician and Marshal of France.
- Marquis de Lally-Tollendal (executed 1766) - nobleman and army officer
- Victoria Balfe (1835 or 1837–1871) - noblewoman and singer
- Henri-Antoine-Marie de Noailles (1890-1947) - 11th Prince de Poix, 7th Duke of Mouchy; French nobleman
- Philippe François Armand Marie de Noailles (born 1922) - Duc de Mouchy, Prince-Duc de Poix; French nobleman

== Politics ==
- Louis Charles Antoine de Beaufranchet (1757-1812) - army officer and politician
- Narcisse-Achille de Salvandy (1795-1856) - French politician
- Patrice de Mac-Mahon, duc de Magenta (1808-1903) - army officer and politician; President of France
- Jean Hennessy (1874-1944) - politician.
- Charles de Gaulle (1890-1970) - army officer and statesman
- Laurence Boone (born 1969) - economist and politician

== Religious ==
- Arthur Richard Dillon (1721–1806) - archbishop of Narbonne
- Thomas Grant (1816-1870) - bishop of Southwark
- Louis Le Cardonnel (1862-1936) - priest and poet
- Patrice Flynn (1874-1970) - Bishop of Nevers

== Sports ==
- Henry Russell (1834-1909) - explorer
- Franck Queudrue - (born 1978) - footballer
- Ultan Dillane (1993) - rugby union player
- Liam Jegou (born 1996) - slalom canoeist
- Grégory Alldritt (born 1997) - rugby union player

== Other ==
- Ernest Archdeacon (1863-1950) - lawyer and aviation pioneer
