= Nicol Mac Flainn =

Irish archbishop

Nicol Mac Flann (fl. 1283) was archbishop-elect of Tuam.

Mac Flann appears to have been a kinsman of a previous archbishop, Flann Mac Flainn (1250–56).

Mac Flann was elected Archbishop of Tuam before 20 October 1283, but never consecrated. His elected predecessor, Malachias Hibernicus, was never installed. It was not until September 1286 that Bishop of Waterford, Stephen de Fulbourn, became the new archbishop.

The surname is now rendered McLynn or Glynn in County Galway.

== See also ==
- Glynn (disambiguation)

Preceded by Tommaltach Ó Conchobair	Archbishop of Tuam; 1283-1283	Succeeded by Malachias Hibernicus
