= Walter Blake fitz John =

Irish priest

- Died: 1508
- Occupations: priest and bishop
- Known for: Bishop of Clonmacnoise
- Parents: John Blake fitz William (father); Annabel Burke (mother)
- Relatives: Geoffrey, Andrew, Peter (brothers)

Walter Blake fitz John (died 1508), Bishop of Clonmacnoise, County Offaly, Ireland.

Blake was the son of John Blake fitz William, third Mayor of Galway (1487–1488). His mother was Annabel Burke, and his brothers were Geoffrey, Andrew and Peter.

Blake was appointed Archbishop of Tuam on 8 August 1483 but did not take effect. He was appointed instead to Clonmacnoise on 26 March 1487. He served in that capacity till his death in 1508.

== See also ==
- The Tribes of Galway
- Sir Valentine Blake, 1st Baronet, merchant and Mayor of Galway 1611, 1630–31.
- Edmond Blake, last Mayor of the old Galway Corporation 1836–40.

Preceded by Donatus Ó Muireadhaigh	Archbishop of Tuam; 1483–1483	Succeeded by Uilliam Seóighe
Preceded by James	Bishop of Clonmacnoise; 1487–1508	Succeeded by Tomás Ó Maolalaidh
