= Mullally =

Mullally, Mulally, Mullaly or Mulaly are anglicized variants of the Irish language surname Ó Maolalaidh thought to have originated from County Galway where it has since been shortened to the form of Lally.

The surname is most numerous in the south east of Ireland in the counties of Tipperary and Kilkenny.

Notable people with the surname include:

- Alan Mulally (born 1945), American business executive, president of Ford Motor Company
- Alan Mullally (born 1969), English cricketer
- Anthony Mullally (born 1991), Irish rugby player
- Dick Mullaly (1892–1971), Australian rules footballer
- Erin Mullally (born 1990), Australian actor and model
- Frederic Mullally (1918–2014), British journalist, public relations executive and novelist
- John Mullaly (1835–1915), American newspaper reporter and editor, "father of the Bronx's park system"
- John Mullally (1930–2021), Canadian teacher and politician
- John E. Mullally (1875–1912), member of the California State Assembly, 30th District, 1910–1912
- Megan Mullally (born 1958), American actress, talk show host and singer
- Mike Mullally (1939–2021), American college athletics administrator
- Paddy Mullally (born 1976), Irish hurler
- Richie Mullally (born 1978), Irish hurler
- Dame Sarah Mullally (born 1962), British Anglican prelate, Archbishop of Canterbury; former nursing administrator
- Seán Ó Maolalaidh (fl. 1419–1480), Chief of the Name
- Una Mullally (born 1983), Irish broadcaster and journalist
- William Ó Mullally (c. 1530 – 1595), Archbishop of Tuam in the Church of Ireland

== See also ==
- Mullally Township, Harlan County, Nebraska
- Lally, Irish surname which refers to the clan name Ó Maolalaidh
