= Conrad Lally =

Canadian World War I flying ace

Conrad Tolendal Lally
- Born: April 3, 1882; Toronto, Ontario, Canada
- Died: August 5, 1941 (aged 59); Wainwright, Canada
- Relatives: Great-grandfather Trophime Gérard de Lally, Marquis de Lally-Tollendal; grandfather Thomas Arthur Lally
- Military career
- Allegiance: George V of the British Empire
- Branch: Flying service
- Rank: Captain
- Unit: No. 25 Squadron RAF
- Awards: Military Cross with Bar, Air Force Cross

Captain Conrad Tolendal Lally MC* AFC (April 3, 1882 – 5 August 1941) was a World War I flying ace credited with five aerial victories. His valorous military service was matched by his devotion to serving his home town and community in peacetime.

== Early life ==
Conrad Tolendahl Lally was the sole child born to Lucy Fedora Wells and Conrad Colthurst Whitley Lally; he arrived in 1882. His noble French General great-grandfather had fought the British in India. His grandfather served through three wars in China with the Royal Navy before emigrating to Canada.

Young Lally was educated at private schools before matriculating at Upper Canada College. After graduation, he went into banking, opening and managing the first Imperial Bank of Canada branch in Banff in 1906. Two years later, he moved to Wainwright, Alberta to go partners in a general store. He became active in civic affairs, becoming mayor. However, as World War I erupted, he volunteered for military service with the Royal Flying Corps.

== World War I ==
In December 1915, Lally received orders for pilot's training at Reading University in England. On Christmas Day, he left his business and mayoralty for St. John's, Newfoundland. A ten-day voyage aboard the RMS Metagama took him across the ocean.

He began aviation training on 24 January 1916, flying 13 minutes in a dual control craft. By the time he graduated on 24 June 1916, he had garnered 22 hours 4 minutes flight time in his log.

Circa 26 June 1916, Lally was appointed a Flying Officer with the rank of second lieutenant. Because of his natural talent, he was posted to 24 Flying Training Squadron as an instructor. During the next eight months, he would accumulate 329 hours of flight time.

On 25 April 1917, he was posted as a pilot to 25 Squadron, which was equipped with two-seater Royal Aircraft Factory FE.2 bombers. On 7 June 1917, with Lieutenant L. F. Williams manning the observer's guns, the two of them drove down a German Albatros D.III fighter out of control and destroyed another west of Lille. The squadron then upgraded to Airco DH.4 bombers. On 5 August 1917, with Basil Blackett at the observer's guns, Lally used his new machine to destroy an Albatros D.V over Pérenchies. On 3 September 1917, the new team drove an Albatros D.V down over Quesnoy in mid-morning and another one over Douai in the evening. The following day, 4 September 1917, the new ace was appointed a Flight Commander with its accompanying promotion to temporary captain.

His aerial victories, however, were secondary to his main duties of bombarding the enemy and taking aerial photographs of his dispositions. These were the milieu of the valorous deeds that earned him both awards of the Military Cross. His first award, the Military Cross, came on 29 November 1917, when he was invested in London, though it would not be gazetted until 18 January 1918. It would be followed up in July 1918 with a Bar in lieu of a second award.

On 3 September 1918, Lally crashed into a tree and put himself into hospital for two months with a thrice-fractured jaw and smashed face. He returned to flying on 4 November 1918, one week before the Armistice.

== Post World War I ==
On 12 December 1919, Lally was granted a short service commission in the Royal Air Force as aFlight Lieutenant. On 10 January 1920, he was put on the RAF's unemployed list.

Lally returned to Wainwright and became the postmaster in 1923. The next year, he married Mary Beryl Rodden; the union would produce a daughter. Lally also returned to public and community service. In the public sphere, he served a second term as mayor, presided as a police magistrate, was president of the local board of trade, and oversaw the schools as a trustee. He also captained the town's hockey team, master of the local Masonic lodge, and supported the Anglican Church.

== Honors and awards ==
Military Cross citation

Lt. (T./Capt.) Conrad T. Lally, R.F.C., Spec. Res.

For conspicuous gallantry and devotion to duty in many bomb raids and photographic and long-distance reconnaissances, many of which he has led most successfully. He has taken part in numerous combats and has destroyed three hostile positions. When ordered to bomb a position he spent 1 1/2 hours looking for it, then returned for more petrol and at the second attempt dropped a bomb, on it and with another set a dump on fire, under most difficult weather conditions.

Bar to the Military Cross

Lt. (T./Capt.) Conrad T. Lally, M.C., R.F.C., Spec. Res.

For conspicuous gallantry and devotion to duty. Flying through and above the clouds, he released his bombs over his objective, well behind the enemy lines, at a height of 500 feet, under heavy fire. On two later occasions he carried out photographic reconnaissances of hostile aerodromes under very bad weather conditions, on account of which several other machines had to give up the journey. He has shown himself to be a most determined and successful leader, his example of courage and skill being of great advantage to his squadron.

On 2 November 1918, he was awarded the Air Force Cross as part of the new medal's inauguration. It would be actually presented to him in March 1921 by Lieutenant Governor Dr. Robert Brett.
