= Diocese of Clonmacnoise =

The Diocese of Clonmacnoise can refer to:

- The Roman Catholic diocese of Clonmacnoise is now incorporated the Roman Catholic Diocese of Ardagh and Clonmacnoise
- The Church of Ireland diocese of Clonmacnoise is now incorporated within the united Diocese of Meath and Kildare

== See also ==
- The Bishop of Clonmacnoise
