= Irish Catholics =

Ethnoreligious group native to Ireland

- Celtic cross

Total population
- 4.6 million (Ireland); 55-60 million (notably in Canada and the Eastern and Central United States)

Regions with significant populations
- Republic of Ireland: 4,000,000
- Northern Ireland: 750,000
- United States: ~20,000,000
- Canada: 5,000,000
- United Kingdom: 370,000
- Australia: 7,000,000
- Argentina: 500,000-1,000,000
- New Zealand (especially high concentration in Te Tai Poutini): 600,000
- France: 15,000

Languages
- English (Irish, American, Canadian, British, Australian and New Zealander), Irish (primarily Ireland), Spanish (Argentine and Mexican) and French (Canadian French, Metropolitan French)

Religion
- Catholic Christianity

Related ethnic groups
- Irish people, Irish diaspora, Irish Travellers, Irish Americans, Irish Canadians, Irish Australians, Irish New Zealanders, Irish Britons, Irish Argentines, Irish Mexicans, Irish French

Irish Catholics (Irish: Caitlicigh na hÉireann) are an ethnoreligious group native to Ireland whose members are both Catholic and Irish. The diaspora and the descendants of Irish Catholics includes millions of Britons, Americans, Canadians and Australians. In countries like the United Kingdom, New Zealand, United States, Canada and Australia, many Catholics descend from Irish immigrants/migrants who passed down their faith.

== Overview and history ==
Divisions between Catholics and Protestants in Ireland played a major role in the history of Ireland from the 16th century to the 20th century, especially during Cromwell's conquest of Ireland (1650s), Home Rule Crisis (1910s) and the Troubles (1960s to 1990s). While religion broadly marks the delineation of these divisions, the contentions were primarily political and they were also related to access to power. For example, while the majority of Irish Catholics had an identity which was independent from Britain's identity and were excluded from power because they were Catholic, a number of the instigators of rebellions against British rule were actually Protestant Irish nationalists, although most Irish Protestants opposed separatism. In the Irish Rebellion of 1798, Catholics and Presbyterians, who were not part of the established Church of Ireland, found common cause.

Irish Catholics are found in many countries around the world, especially in the Anglosphere. Emigration exponentially increased due to the Great Famine which lasted from 1845 to 1852. In the United States, anti-Irish sentiment and anti-Catholicism was espoused by the Know Nothing movement of the 1850s and other 19th-century anti-Catholic and anti-Irish organizations. By the 1960s, Irish Catholics were well established in the United States and today they are fully-integrated into mainstream American society with two Irish Catholic Presidents, John F. Kennedy and Joe Biden, having been elected.

== See also ==
- Catholic Church in Ireland
- Celtic Christianity
- Cultural Christians
- Irish Americans
  - Scotch-Irish Americans
- Irish Britons
  - Irish Scots
- Irish Canadians
  - Irish Newfoundlanders
  - Irish Quebecers
- Irish Australians
- Irish New Zealanders
- Irreligion in the Republic of Ireland
- Penal Laws
- Religion in Northern Ireland
- Religion in the Republic of Ireland
- Saint Patrick's Day
- Ulster Protestants
- Ulster Scots people
