= Orla of Kilcreevanty =

Orla of Kilcreevanty (fl. 1308) was an Arroasian Abbess.

Orla is one of a very few known abbesses of Kilcreevanty. It was founded in the mid-to-late 12th century and appears to have continued into the sixteenth century.

Orla experienced difficulties with William de Bermingham, the Archbishop of Tuam. In 1308 she sued him for trespass, stating that

despite the fact that the abbey was under the protection of the king and that the king had warned the Archbishop not to trouble the nuns, she and her nuns were continually subject to excessive and expensive visitations and demands for goods by the Archbishop. She alleged that he regularly entered the abbey with men and horses and had seized goods to the value of one hundred pounds.

The resolution of the dispute is not known, although Gillian Kenny surmises that other motives were at work, stating that "The reasons for the dispute may be deeper-seated than they appear, however."

She was preceded as abbess by Fionnuala Ní Conchobair, daughter of Felim mac Cathal Crobderg Ua Conchobair. The exact duration of Orla's term of office is not known, nor the identity of her successor.

That both she and Fionnuala bore Gaelic, rather than Anglo-Irish, names, points to Kilcreevanty having been a Gaelic community.

Preceded by Fionnuala Ní Conchobair	Abbess of Kilcreevanty; 1301? - after 1308	Succeeded by ?
