= Máel Muire Ó Lachtáin =

Irish archbishop

Máel Muire Ó Lachtáin was Dean of Tuam from 1230 and then the fourth Archbishop of Tuam from 1235 to 1249.

The History of the Popes describes him as:

Dean of Tuam, having been elected by the Chapter, was accepted by the Pope, and afterward received confirmation from the King (Henry III of England). The Four Masters seem to intimate that he was consecrated in England. He is said to have been an eminent canonist ... He undertook a pilgrimage to Jerusalem and wrote an account of it. ... He died at the town of Athlone, about Christmas, in the year 1249.

Preceded by Felix Ua Ruanada	Archbishop of Tuam; 1235-1249	Succeeded by Flann Mac Flainn
