= William de Bermingham =

William de Bermingham (died January 1312) was Archbishop of Tuam.

De Bermingham was a member of the family of Baron Athenry. His father was Meyler de Bermingham (dead by 1275). He had a number of children. Among them were Will Finn de Bermingham and Simon de Bermingham, killed with their cousin John de Bermingham, 1st Earl of Louth, during the Bragenstown Massacre in 1329. His nephew, Rickard de Bermingham (died 1322) successfully defended his lands, defeating a large Irish army at the Second Battle of Athenry in 1316.

He was involved in a dispute with Abbess Orla of Kilcreevanty in 1308, who stated that "despite the fact that the abbey was under the protection of the king and that the king had warned the Archbishop not to trouble the nuns, she and her nuns were continually subject to excessive and expensive visitations and demands for goods by the Archbishop. She alleged that he regularly entered the abbey with men and horses and had seized goods to the value of one hundred pounds."

Preceded by Stephen de Fulbourn	Archbishop of Tuam; 1288-1312	Succeeded by Máel Sechlain Mac Áeda
