= Arthur O'Friel =

Irish Roman Catholic clergyman

Arthur O'Friel (or O’Frigil) (died circa 1573) was an Irish Roman Catholic clergyman who attempted, but failed, to get possession of the archbishopric of Tuam in the 16th century.

A canon of Raphoe, he was appointed Archbishop of Tuam by the Holy See on 7 October 1538, but failed to get possession of the see from Christopher Bodkin, who the latter had accepted Royal Supremacy in 1537. It is not known if O'Friel was ever consecrated, and resigned when Bodkin was absolved from schism in 1555. After Bodkin's death in 1572, O'Friel made no effort to get possession of the see. He died circa 1573.
