= Maol Muire Ó hÚigínn =

Irish Catholic clergyman (??–1590)

Styles of Maol Muire Ó hÚigínn
- Reference style: The Most Reverend
- Spoken style: Your Grace or Archbishop

Maol Muire Ó hÚigínn, also Maol Muire Ó Huiginn (Anglicised: Miler O'Higgin; died 1590 at Antwerp), was an Irish Catholic clergyman. A Franciscan, he was appointed Archbishop of Tuam by the Holy See on 24 March 1586, and died in office.

Ó hÚigínn was a son of Mathghamhain mac Maol Ó hÚigínn of Dougharane, Leyeny, County Sligo, a descendant of Tadg Óg Ó hUiginn (died 1448). His brother was the poet Tadhg Dall Ó hÚigínn. Little is known of Ó hÚigínn's early life, but Tadhg Dall was fostered at Tír Conaill with the ruling Uí Domnaill family, and Maol Muire may have gone there with his brother. According to McGettigan, "A later source states that in his youth Maol Muire was an accomplished poet and harpist and also something of a philosopher."

Ó hÚigínn was educated on the continent, where he took degrees in canon law, civil law and theology. This high standard of education led to his consecration as Archbishop of Tuam in April 1586. He left for Rome sometime prior to 1590, possibly as a result of the severity of the rule of Richard Bingham. He was on his way back from Rome when he died at the episcopal palace at Antwerp on 5 August 1590, and was buried in the Cathedral of Our Lady within the city.

Some of Ó hÚigínn's poems are extant. One, on the uncertainty of life, begins its twelve verses: A fhir threbas in tulaig, (English: 'O man that ploughest the hillside'). Another, in praise of Ireland, is one hundred and thirty-six verses long. Its first line is: A fhir theidh go fiodh funnidh, (‘O man who goest to the land of sunset’). Several other of his poems on religious subjects survive. Ó hÚigínn's poems were still known by poets and historians, and continued to be copied in manuscripts well into the 19th century.

Catholic Church titles
Preceded by Nicholas Skerrett	Archbishop of Tuam; 1586–1590	Succeeded by Seamus Ó hÉilidhe
