= Walter de Saleron =

Sixth Archbishop of Tuam, Ireland

Walter de Saleron (a.k.a. Walter of London), sixth Archbishop of Tuam, 1257–1258.

Formerly Archdeacon of Norfolk (1239 to c.1254) and Dean of St Paul's, London (1254–1257), de Saleron was consecrated by the Pope 6 September 1257. His appointment was controversial because the Chapter of Tuam had already unanimously elected James Ó Lachtáin, who received the king's confirmation later, on 16 October 1257, but because of de Saleron's appointment, was never able to take possession. De Saleron received possession of the temporalities on 6 November 1257 but had died before 22 April 1258.

The History of the Popes says of him:

He never personally visited his see, having been cut off by death at London, on his way home from Rome.

Preceded by Flann Mac Flainn	Archbishop of Tuam; 1257-1258	Succeeded by Tommaltach Ó Conchobair
