= Tomás mac Muircheartaigh Ó Ceallaigh =

Tomás mac Muircheartaigh Ó Ceallaigh (Modern Irish: ['t̪ˠɔmˠaːsˠ mˠak ˈmˠɪɾʲɪçaɾˠt̪ˠiː oː ˈcal̪ˠiː]), O.P., Archbishop of Tuam, 1438 to 1441.

Bishop Ó Ceallaigh was translated from the see of Clonfert in 1438. He was a member of the Ui Maine dynasty of south-east Connacht.

The History of the Popes says he:

was translated to Tuam by the Pope. He is spoken of as being a man eminent for piety and liberality.

Catholic Church titles
Preceded by Sean Mac Feorais	Archbishop of Tuam; 1438–1441	Succeeded by John MacSeonin Burke
