= Nicholas Skerrett =

Irish archbishop

Styles of Nicholas Skerrett
- Reference style: The Most Reverend
- Spoken style: Your Grace or Archbishop

Nicholas Skerrett (died 1583) was a Roman Catholic clergyman who was Archbishop of Tuam in Ireland from 1580 to 1583.

A graduate of the Collegium Germanicum in Rome, he was appointed Archbishop of Tuam on 17 October 1580. On his arrival in Ireland, he was thrown into prison, but managed to escape and made his way to Spain. He eventually took refuge in Lisbon, Portugal, where he died in February 1583 and was buried in the church of São Roque.

Catholic Church titles
Preceded by Christopher Bodkin	Archbishop of Tuam; 1580–1583	Succeeded by Miler O'Higgin
