= John MacSeonin Burke =

Irish Roman Catholic cleric and Archbishop of Tuam (d.1450)

The Most Reverend John de Burgo OSA
- Native name: Seán MacSeóinín de Búrca
- Church: Roman Catholic Church
- Archdiocese: Archbishop of Tuam
- In office: 1441–1450
- Predecessor: Tomás mac Muircheartaigh Ó Ceallaigh
- Successor: Donatus Ó Muireadhaigh

Personal details
- Born: John MacSeonin Burke
- Died: 1450

John MacSeonin Burke or John de Burgo, O.S.A. (Irish: Seán MacSeóinín de Búrca; died 1450) was an Irish Roman Catholic cleric who was Archbishop of Tuam (1441–1450).

== Career ==
Burke was appointed Archbishop of Tuam in 1441.

Burke was a member of the Mac Seonin branch of the Bourkes of County Mayo, later anglicised as Jennings. Another notable member of this family was General Charles Edward Jennings de Kilmaine (1751–99).

The History of the Popes comments:

Some of the annalists call him "the Archbishop of Conaught, the son of the Parson, son of Mac Johnin Burke." He died in Galway in the year 1450.

== See also ==
- House of Burgh, an Anglo-Norman and Hiberno-Norman dynasty founded in 1193
- Catholic Church in Ireland

Catholic Church titles
Preceded by Tomás mac Muircheartaigh Ó Ceallaigh	Archbishop of Tuam; 1441–1450	Succeeded by Donatus Ó Muireadhaigh
