= Sean Mac Feorais =

15th century Irish archbishop

- Archbishop of Tuam
- Church: Catholic Church
- Archdiocese: Tuam

Sean Mac Feorais, a.k.a. John de Bermingham, a.k.a. John Winfield was Archbishop of Tuam during 1430 to 1437.

Mac Feorais was a member of the de Bermingham family, Baron Athenry. Mac Feorais was the Gaelic form of their surname, and by Archbishop's lifetime, had become deeply Gaelicised. He was possibly a younger brother of Walter de Bermingham, Lord Athenry, who died 1428.

He was appointed 7 June and consecrated after 5 December 1430. The See had been vacant since 1411.

The History of the Popes has no information on him, instead quoting from the Annals of the Four Masters:

"The Archbishop of Connaught (Tuam), of the Bermingham family, died." Quaere, to whom does this allude?

Catholic Church titles
Preceded by Cornelius	Archbishop of Tuam; 1430–1437	Succeeded by Tomás mac Muircheartaigh Ó Ceallaigh
