= Malachy of Ireland =

Irish theologian and Archbishop

Malachy of Ireland (fl. 1279–1300), also known as Malachias Hibernicus, was a theologian and Archbishop of Tuam in 1280.

He was a friar of the Franciscan convent of Limerick and was elected Archbishop of Tuam, though never officially installed. He was first mentioned in a letter of 1279 from Nicol Mac Máel Ísu, Archbishop of Armagh, to Edward I of England, Lord of Ireland, asking that Brother Malachy be appointed to Tuam. The king granted this request in a letter dated 22 April 1280. However, five of the seven canons of Tuam chosen as electors voted for Nicol Mac Flainn, a fellow canon. This resulted in Stephen de Fulbourn being transferred from Waterford to Tuam. Malachy had by then abandoned his claim, and his election was annulled.

Malachy may also be the author of a treatise, De veneno, on the seven deadly sins, published in Paris in 1518 and alternatively attributed to Robert Grosseteste. It is stated as having been written "for the instruction of simple men who have to teach the people". The edition stated that he was a Franciscan preacher who was alive in 1300, "a doctor of theology, a strenuous expounder of the scriptures and a most zealous rebuker of vices." Apparently he also wrote a book of sermons, now lost. John Bale recorded that he was well received in Ireland, esteemed at Oxford, and preached before Edward II.
