= Malachy Ó Caollaidhe =

Irish Roman Catholic archbishop (died 1645)

Styles of Malachy Ó Caollaidhe
- Reference style: The Most Reverend
- Spoken style: Your Grace or Archbishop

Malachy Ó Caollaidhe, also known as Malachy Queally, Malachias Quælly, O'Queely or O'Quechly (died 1645) was an Irish Roman Catholic Archbishop of Tuam. He was called by Irish writers Maelseachlainn Ua Cadhla, by John Colgan Queleus, and erroneously by Thomas Carte, O'Kelly.

== Life ==
Malachy Ó Caollaidhe was born in the barony of Corcomroe in County Clare. He belonged to a family which ruled Connemara till 1238, when they were conquered by the O'Flaherties.

Ó Caollaidhe became a student at the College of Navarre in Paris, and there graduated with a Doctorate of Divinity. He was professor of philosophy at the Sorbonne for a time. He returned to Ireland and was appointed the vicar-apostolic of Killaloe by a papal brief on 30 August 1619. Following the death of Florence Conroy, he was appointed the archbishop of Tuam on 28 June 1630 and consecrated at Galway on 10 October 1630 by Thomas Walsh, archbishop of Cashel, with Richard Arthur, bishop of Limerick, and Boetius Egan, bishop of Elphin, serving as co-consecrators.

In 1631 he presided at a council held at Galway to enforce the decrees of the council of Trent in Ireland. He caused the ancient wooden figure of St. Mac Dara in the church of Cruachmic Dara, County Galway, to be buried on the island, probably in consequence of some superstitious proceedings to which it had given rise. He went into hiding for several months in 1634 when the state wished to investigate charges of him having ordained priests.

His work in Tuam provoked a complaint from Richard Boyle, the Church of Ireland archbishop of Tuam, in 1641. Queally attended the national synod of 1643, by which the Catholic Confederation was organized, and its assembly at Kilkenny in 1645. He was elected to the Supreme Council, and later was appointed President of Connaught. The Papal Nuncio Giovanni Battista Rinuccini planned to meet him and Heber MacMahon upon his arrival in 1645 but he died before this could occur: Pope Innocent X had recommended him by letter to Rinuccini as a man to be trusted.

Archbishop Ó Caollaidhe visited the Aran islands and wrote an account of his trip.

During the Irish Confederate Wars, he raised a body of fighting men in Galway and Mayo, and joined the forces of Sir James Dillon, near Ballysadare, County Sligo. They aimed to recover Sligo from the Scottish Covenanters. On Sunday, 26 October 1645, Viscount Taafe and Dillon dined with Queally, and while they were dining the Irish forces were attacked by Sir Charles Coote, Sir William Cole, and Sir Francis Hamilton, and put to flight. The archbishop's secretary, Tadhg O'Connell, was killed trying to save his master, and the archbishop himself was first wounded by a pistol-shot, and then cut down. The Earl of Glamorgan's agreement with the Confederate Catholics and a letter from Charles I of England were found in his pocket. The English Parliament published the correspondence to prejudice both parties, Catholic and royalist.

Walter Lynch on the Irish side gave £30 for his body, which was carried to Tuam. It was reburied some time later by Brigit, Lady Athenry, but the tomb is no longer known. Dr. Edmund Meara wrote an epitaph for him in Latin verse, but failed to discover his burial-place.

== Works ==
He wrote an account of the Aran Islands, printed in Colgan's Acta Sanctorum Hiberniæ (p. 714), and is translated in James Hardiman's edition of Roderic O'Flaherty's Description of West Connaught.

== Sources ==
- C. P. Meehan, Irish Hierarchy in the 17th Century (16th edit., Dublin, about 1888)
- Denis Murphy, Our Martyrs (Dublin: Fallon, 1896)

Attribution

This article incorporates text from a publication now in the public domain: "Quælly, Malachias". Dictionary of National Biography. London: Smith, Elder & Co. 1885–1900.
