= Uilliam Seóighe =

Uilliam Seóighe (William Joyce), Archbishop of Tuam, died 1508. Seóighe was said to be a native of Galway town. He directly succeeded Donatus Ó Muireadhaigh, O.S.A, as Walter Blake fitz John had been appointed but not consecrated.

Archbishop Seóighe was appointed on 16 May 1485 and consecrated in 1487. He died on either the 20 or 20 December 1501.

== See also ==
- The Tribes of Galway
- Henry Joyce, Mayor of Galway, 1542–1543.
- Richard Joyce (c. 1660–c. 1737), former slave, goldsmith and creator of the Claddagh Ring.
- Tadhg S. Seioghe (1857–after 1930), writer.
- William Joyce (1906–1946), aka Lord Haw-Haw, fascist and Nazi propaganda broadcaster.
- Timothy Joyce (1868–1947), parish priest of Portumna, 1919–1947.
- Máirtín Chóilín Choilmín Seoighe, last inhabitant of Inish Barra, Connemara.
- Gráinne Seoige (born 1973), broadcaster.
- Pádraic Joyce (born 1977), Gaelic football player.
- Síle Seoige (born 1979), broadcaster.
- Damien Joyce (born 1980), Gaelic Athletic Association sportsperson.

Preceded by Donatus Ó Muireadhaigh	Archbishop of Tuam; 1485–1501	Succeeded by Phillip Pinson
