= Christopher Bodkin =

Irish prelate

Styles of Christopher Bodkin
- Reference style: The Most Reverend
- Spoken style: Your Grace or Archbishop

Christopher Bodkin (or Bodkyn or Bodekin) (died 1572) was an Irish prelate, who was the Archbishop of Tuam, and Bishop of Kilmacduagh during the Irish Reformation.

== Biography ==
He was appointed Bishop of Kilmacduagh on 3 September 1533 and consecrated on 4 November 1533. Four years later, he accepted Royal Supremacy and was appointed Archbishop of Tuam by King Henry VIII on 15 February 1537, but continued to hold the bishopric of Kilmacduagh. He swore the Oath of Supremacy at Clonmel early in 1539.

In opposition to Bodkin, the papacy appointed Arthur O'Friel to Tuam and Cornelius O'Dea to Kilmacduagh, but they failed to get possession of the sees. On the accession of Queen Mary I, Bodkin was absolved from schism by Cardinal Pole, and appointed apostolic administrator of Tuam and Kilmacduagh on 7 October 1555.

On the accession of Queen Elizabeth I, he retained possession of both sees. He took the Oath of Supremacy, recognizing the Queen as Supreme Governor of the Church, in 1560 He died in office in 1572.

Catholic Church titles
Preceded by Matthaeus Ó Briain	Bishop of Kilmacduagh; 1533–1572 (Opposed by Cornelius O'Dea)	Succeeded by Stephen Kirwan (Church of Ireland)
Preceded by Matthaeus Ó Briain	Bishop of Kilmacduagh; 1533–1572 (Opposed by Cornelius O'Dea)	Succeeded by Malachy O'Maloney (Roman Catholic)
Preceded by Tomás Ó Maolalaidh	Archbishop of Tuam; 1537–1572 (Opposed by Arthur O'Friel)	Succeeded by William O'Mullally (Church of Ireland)
Preceded by Tomás Ó Maolalaidh	Archbishop of Tuam; 1537–1572 (Opposed by Arthur O'Friel)	Succeeded by Nicholas Skerrett (Roman Catholic)
