= Claregalway =

Village in County Galway, Ireland

Baile Chláir Claregalway
- Village
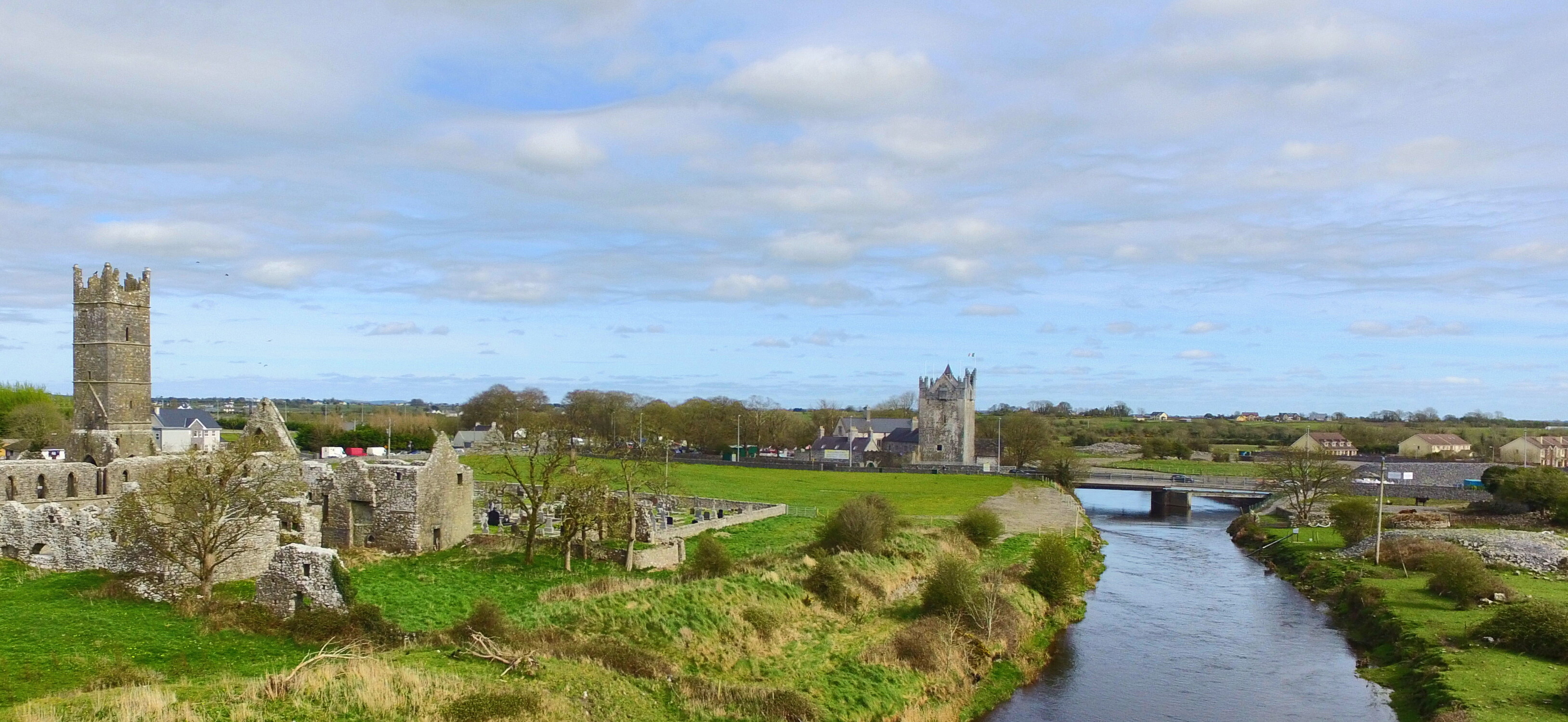
- Claregalway's friary (left), castle (centre) and bridge (right)

- Location in Ireland
- Coordinates: 53°20′19″N 8°56′44″W
- Country: Ireland
- Province: Connacht
- County: County Galway
- Elevation: 12 m (39 ft)

Population (2022)
  - Total: 1,632
- Irish Grid Reference: M370324
- As this is a Gaeltacht village, the Irish Baile Chláir is the only official name. The anglicized name Claregalway has no official standing.

Baile Chláir or Baile Chláir na Gaillimhe (anglicised Claregalway) is a Gaeltacht village approximately 10 km north of Galway city in County Galway, Ireland. Claregalway was founded on the banks of the River Clare, hence the derivation of its name: Baile Chláir na Gaillimhe meaning "town on the Clare, in Galway". Claregalway lies within a Gaeltacht (Irish speaking) area and most locals traditionally spoke English only as a second language. The village is in a civil parish and barony of the same name.

== History ==
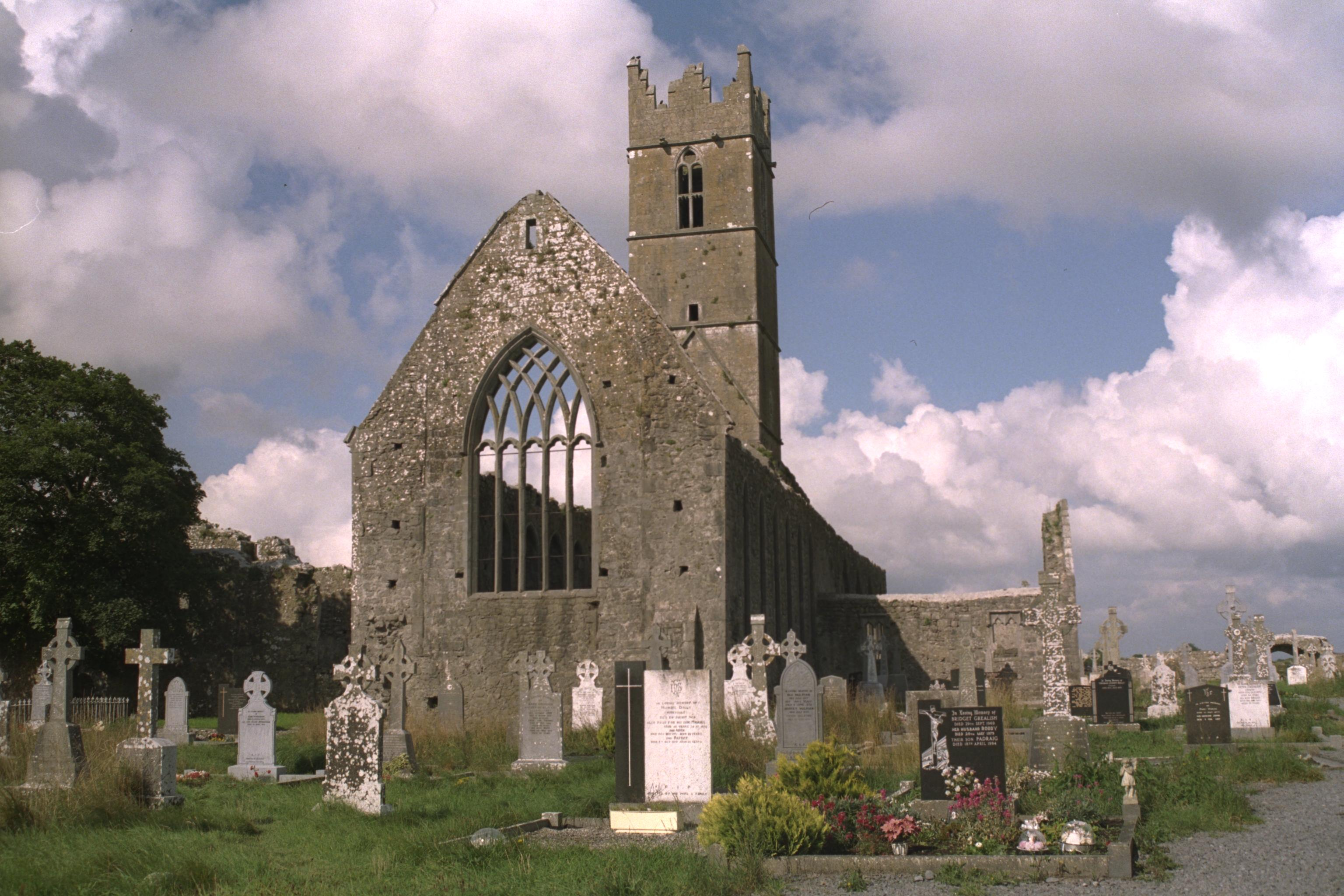
East View of Claregalway Friary

Evidence of ancient settlement around the village include a number of ringfort, bawn, enclosure and crannog sites in the townlands of Claregalway, Cloonacauneen, Lydacan and Pollaghrevagh.

Among the larger historical sites, within the village bounds on the banks of the River Clare, are Claregalway Friary, founded in mid-13th century, and a Norman tower house dating to the 16th century.

According to the Annals of Connacht, O'Domnaill (of the O'Donnell's of Tírconnell) and Macwilliam Burke (of the Burkes of Mayo "burnt the town" of Claregalway in

In 2001, a restoration of an old bridge over the old course of the River Clare was completed. These nine stone arches are above the level of the current road.

19th-century view showing the abbey, the old bridge and the tower

The civil parish of Claregalway (Baile Chláir) is approximately 50 km^{2} (19 sq mi) in area and spans 29 townlands. Some of the larger townlands include Carnmore, Lydican, Loughgeorge and Cregboy. Lydican is notable as the origin of the Irish ancestors (Patrick Lynch) of Che Guevara. Lydican was the site of an O'Heyne Castle and the last of the chieftains, Connor Crone O Heyne, was living there in 1612. The lands of the O'Heyne chieftains were confiscated in the late 17th century and it was then that the Lynches took up residence there. The Lynches principal holdings were in the city of Galway.

Until September 2017, the village sat at the junction of the busy N17 and N18 national primary routes with over 27,000 vehicles having formerly passed through the village every day.

In early 2026 it was reported that Claregalway was the subject of a proposed Galway County Council "masterplan aimed at regenerating the village and transforming it into a small town". As of May 2026, a proposed Claregalway by-pass was included in the National Development Plan for the first time.

== Demographics ==
The population of the village more than tripled in size in the 20 years between the 2002 and 2022. The village is within the commuter belt of Galway City, with the 2022 census indicating that over 50% of people in the village had commutes of more than 15 minutes.

=== Irish language ===
According to the 2022 census, there were 1,632 people living in Baile Chláir, of which less than 2% indicated that they spoke Irish every day outside of the education system. This makes Baile Chláir one of the weakest Gaeltacht towns in the country, with the majority of the population speaking English.

== Culture ==
Claregalway hosts a drama festival each year in March. Compántas Lir is an amateur drama group which is based in Claregalway and Carnmore.

== Education ==
Coláiste Bhaile Chláir is a co-educational secondary school in Claregalway. As of December 2024, it had an enrollment of over 1,270.

== Sport ==
Claregalway CLG is the local Gaelic Athletic Association (GAA) club.

The local basketball club participates in local leagues at underage through to senior level.

Claregalway Handball club opened a new-arena style handball alley in 2018.

== Notable residents ==
- Dana Rosemary Scallon, Irish singer and former MEP.
