= Flaithrí Ó Maolchonaire =

Irish Franciscan and theologian

Flaithrí Ó Maolchonaire O.F.M.
- Archbishop of Tuam
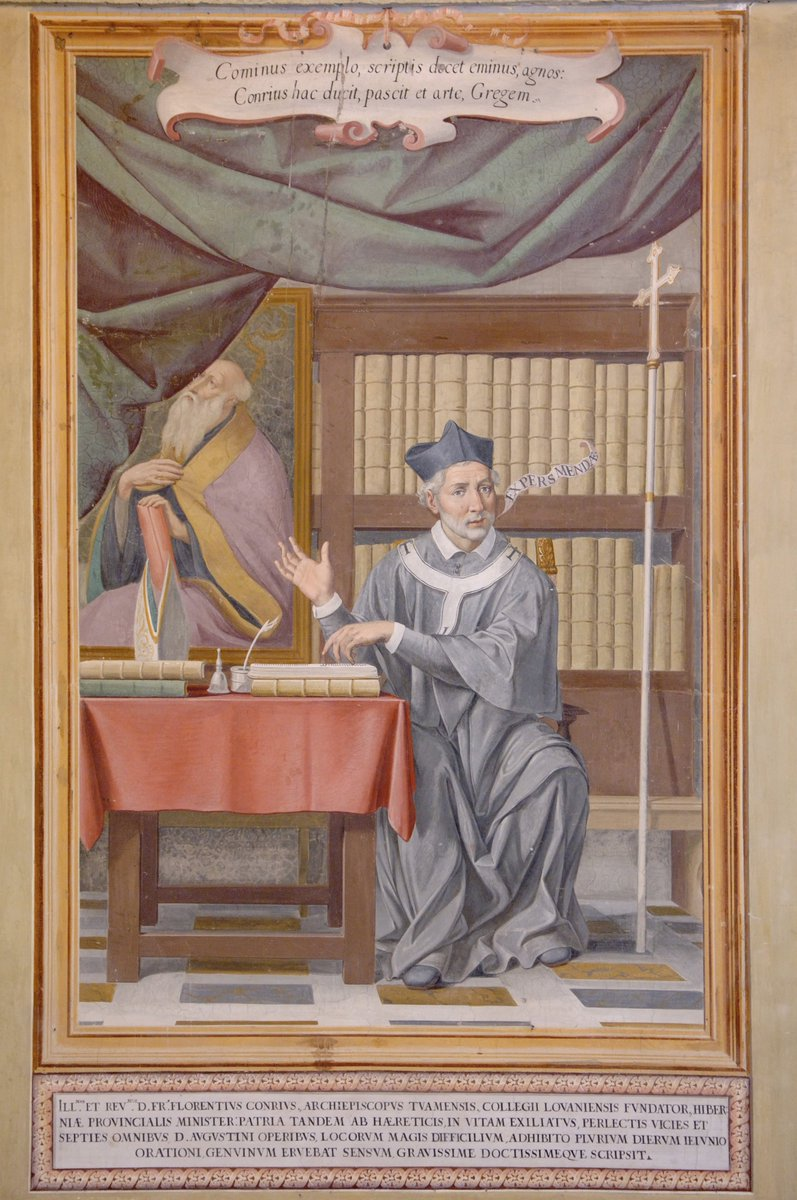
- Archdiocese: Tuam
- Province: Connaught
- Diocese: Tuam
- See: Tuam
- Elected: 1609
- Predecessor: Seamus Ó hÉilidhe
- Successor: Malachy Ó Caollaidhe

Orders
- Consecration: 1609 by Maffeo Barberini (later Pope Urban VIII)

Personal details
- Born: Flaithrí c. 1560 Figh, civil parish of Tibohine, County Roscommon, Ireland
- Died: 18 November 1629 (age 69) Madrid, Spain
- Buried: College of St Anthony of Padua, Leuven
- Denomination: Catholic
- Parents: Fíthil and Onóra Ó Maolchonaire
- Education: Ireland and Spain
- Alma mater: University of Salamanca

Styles of Flaithrí Ó Maolchonaire
- Reference style: The Most Reverend
- Spoken style: Your Grace or Archbishop

Flaithrí Ó Maolchonaire (also known as Florence Conry, Conroy, O'Mulconry, Omoelchonry Omulconner; c. 1560 – 18 November 1629), was an Irish Franciscan and theologian, founder of the College of St Anthony of Padua, Leuven, and Archbishop of Tuam.

== Early life and career ==
Flaithrí Ó Maolchonaire was born in the townland of Figh, civil parish of Tibohine, barony of Frenchpark, County Roscommon. His father and mother were Fíthil and Onóra Ó Maolchonaire. Two other sons survived to adulthood, Maoilechlainn and Firbisigh. They belonged to a well-known family of historians and poets whose principal estate was at Cluain Plocáin (Ballymulconry), civil parish of Kiltrustan, County Roscommon. Flaithrí was brought up in the family profession.

He studied for the priesthood at Salamanca, entering the Irish college founded in 1592. Ó Maolchonaire first studied the liberal arts and philosophy. On 10 December 1594, he was in the third year of his studies at Salamanca. A year earlier he had translated into Irish a short Castilian catechism by Jerónimo de Ripalda SJ. The original is a simple catechetical work written in Aristotelian master-pupil dialogue. According to Mícheál Mac Craith, Ó Maolchonaire's translation pointedly referred to the Irish as Éirinnach rather than Gaedheal.

After five years at the Salamanca Irish college, Ó Maolchonaire left to join the Franciscan province of Santiago. Aodh Mac Cathmhaoil was among his classmates in the Salamanca Franciscan friary. They and nine of their peers in the Santiago province were later raised to the episcopacy, an unprecedented development in the history of the order. In a memorial of 1606, Francisco Arias Dávila y Bobadilla, conde de Puñonrostro, stated that Ó Maolchonaire was ordained after taking the habit of the friars minor.

== Activities during and after the Nine Years' War ==
At the height of the Nine Years' War, Flaithrí Ó Maolchonaire sailed to Ireland where he served as a confessor and preacher to troops under the command of Hugh O'Neill and Red Hugh O'Donnell. In 1601, they requested a bishopric for Ó Maolchonaire 'in recognition of his diligence, commending his sound judgment on Irish affairs.' After the disaster of Kinsale in 1601, Ó Maolchonaire accompanied O'Donnell to Spain as his confessor and adviser, hoping to see a renewal of Spanish military intervention in Ireland.

In 1602, Ó Maolchonaire attempted to get approval for O'Donnell to meet Philip III in person but they were kept at arm's length by the Spanish court. During this time, they also drafted an official complaint against the Jesuit superiors of the Irish college at Salamanca over presumed discrimination in favour of Old English students at the expense of students from Connacht and Ulster.

Despondent at having to wait so long for a response to his repeated calls for military support in Ireland, O'Donnell became seriously ill. He died at Simancas, being assisted on his deathbed by Ó Maolconaire Writing to Rome, Ludovico Mansoni recorded the day of the earl's death as 9 September, stating that O'Donnell died from a tapeworm after sixteen days of illness. In keeping with his patronage of the order of friars minor in Donegal, Red Hugh O'Donnell was buried in the Franciscan habit. Ó Maolchonaire accompanied the remains to their last resting place in the Franciscan church at Valladolid. Aware that the patronage vital to military intervention and to the education of their followers came from the same sources, Ó Maolchonaire continued to press for action after the death of O'Donnell. He participated in an abandoned maritime expedition which reached Achill Sound in 1603 but never landed in Ireland. Ó Maolchonaire subsequently assisted the Spanish councils of state and war to stem the flow of Irish military migrants and their dependents in Spain.

As adviser to Puñonrostro, the king's appointee as protector of Irish exiles in Spain, Ó Maolchonaire helped to secure funds for widows, orphans and clerics. Trained as a chronicler and genealogist, he sponsored the entry of Irish soldiers into Spanish military orders and successfully called for the promotion of Henry O'Neill, second eldest son of the earl of Tyrone, as colonel of Irish infantry units in Flanders, the O'Neill tercio in 1604.

== The Foundation of the College of St Anthony of Padua ==
In 1606, the Franciscan general chapter was held in Toledo where Flaithrí Ó Maolchonaire was selected as minister-provincial of the Irish friars minor. His assimilation into Castilian life and the contacts he made were of considerable benefit to his confrères and successors. The most notable act of his tenure as provincial was the founding of a new Irish Franciscan college at Leuven in the Habsburg Netherlands. A year before his appointment, Ó Maolchonaire began his efforts in earnest with an appeal to the Spanish king. The loss of five Franciscan houses during the Nine Years' War made a new foundation essential. In response, Philip III instructed Archduke Albert to provide a perpetual grant for a new college in the university town of Leuven. Ó Maolchonaire's part in founding the college clearly influenced the Catholic pastoral mission to Ireland during the seventeenth century. The first and most active Irish printing press on the continent was long in operation at Leuven.

== Ó Maolchonaire and the Flight of the Earls ==
After Hugh O'Neill and Rory O'Donnell left Ireland in 1607, Flaithrí Ó Maolconaire accompanied them from Douai to Rome as interpreter and advisor. Christopher St. Laurence, baron of Howth, implicated Ó Maolchonaire in a plot to seize Dublin Castle and raise a new rebellion just before the Flight of the Earls. In recognition of his losses, Philip III and Paul V offered O'Neill the concession of Ó Maolchonaire's promotion to the archbishopric of Tuam. On Sunday 3 May 1609, Ó Maolchonaire was consecrated archbishop by Cardinal Maffeo Barberini in the centre of Rome at the Chiesa Santo Spirito in Sassia. Ó Maolchonaire remained in Rome until his appointment as archbishop of Tuam before returning to Madrid on behalf of Hugh O'Neill. He communicated in 1610 to the Council of Spain, a translation of the original (Irish) statement of one Francis Maguire concerning his observations in the "State of Virginia", between 1608 and 1610, a curious and unique document of the earliest English settlements in the New World and the life and habits of the Indian tribes.

In response to the 1613–1615 Parliament of Ireland, Ó Maolchonaire wrote from Valladolid a remonstrance to the Catholic members of the parliament, rebuking them for assenting to the Bill of Attainder that confiscated the estates of O'Neill, O'Donnell and their adherents. As Archbishop of Tuam, Ó Maolconaire never took possession of his see, governing through vicars general. He continued to live in Madrid and Leuven, as was the case with many Irish clergy at the time. Like his fellow-Franciscan, Luke Wadding, and Peter Lombard, Archbishop of Armagh, Ó Maolchonaire served as a key intermediary and his influence in Irish matters was considerable. In 1626, a year after Charles I declared war on Spain, Ó Maolchonaire made the case for an invasion of Ireland under the joint leadership of the earls of Tyrone and Tyrconnell.

== Legacy ==
Flaithrí Ó Maolconaire died at the Franciscan friary of San Francisco el Grande in Madrid on 18 November 1629. In 1654, two Irish friars brought his remains back to the College of St Anthony of Padua in Leuven where he was buried in the collegiate chapel, near the high altar. An epitaph in stone by Nicolas Aylmer recorded his virtues, learning and love of country:-- :Ordinis altus honor, fidei patriaeque honos, Pontificum merito laude perenne jubar. The inscription on the grave-slab, by another author, describes Ó Maolchonaire as laboribus variis fidei et patriae...fractus ('worn out by various labours for faith and fatherland').

Ó Maolconaire's best-known written work was printed at Leuven in 1616. Sgáthán an Chrábhaidh (Mirror of Devotion) , is a translation into Irish of a popular allegorical tale, Spill de la Vida Religiosa. Ó Maolchonaire may have become familiar with the original text during his studies at Salamanca where the eleventh Castilian edition had been published in 1580. Seán Ó Súilleabháin states that Ó Maolchonaire also referred to a copy of the original Catalan for his Irish translation. Ó Maolchonaire omitted more than half of the original while making various additions of his own, one of which was specifically aimed at encouraging Irish Catholics to remain faithful. It appears to be the first formal application of Bellarmine and Suárez to the political situation in Ireland with Ó Maolchonaire rejecting the right of temporal princes to claim spiritual jurisdiction.

At Antwerp in 1619, Ó Maolchonaire published De Augustini sensu circa b. Mariae Virginis conceptionem.

O'Maolconaire was a scholastic theologian, especially in the writings of Augustine of Hippo on grace and free will. His Peregrinus Jerichontinus, hoc est de natura humana feliciter instituta, infeliciter lapsa, miserabiter vulnerata, misericorditer restaurata (ed. Thady MacNamara, Paris, 1641) treats of original sin, the grace of Christ and free will. Here, the "Pilgrim of Jerico" was human nature itself, with Satan the thief and the good Samaritan, Our Lord. Hunter says that this edition was owing to Arnauld who is possibly the author of the French version of 1645. Other works attributed to Ó Maolchonaire on the teaching and opinions of Augustine are "de gratia Christi" (Paris 1646); "De flagellis justorum, juxta mentem S. Augustini" (Paris 1644) and Compendium doctrinae S. Augustini circa gratiam (Paris 1645). There is a fresco of Ó Maolchonaire by Fra Emanuele da Como (1672) in the Aula Maxima at St Isidore's, Rome. Many of his letters survive in Spanish, Latin and Italian.

== Family tree: An Sliocht Pháidín ==
  Paidín mac Lochlainn meic Maelsechlainn Ó Maolconaire, d. 1506 (a quo Sliocht Pháidín)
  |
  |_______________________________
  |                              |
  |                              |
  Lochlainn                      Muirgheas mac Pháidín Ó Maolconaire, d. 1543. 
  |                              |
  |                              |_____________ 
  Séan Ruadh                     |           |
  |                              |           |
  |                              Eóluis      Fíthil and Onóra_____________ 
  Lochlainn                      |           |                |           | 
  |                              |           |                |           |
  |                              Torna        Maoilechlainn Firbisigh  Fláithrí, Archbishop of Tuam, c.1560–1629
  Fearfeasa Ó Maol Chonaire
