= Seamus Ó hÉilidhe =

Irish Catholic archbishop

Styles of Seamus Ó hÉilidhe
- Reference style: The Most Reverend
- Spoken style: Your Grace or Archbishop

Seamus Ó hÉilidhe (anglicised James O'Hely, Latinised Jacobus Helius; died c. March 1594) was an Irish clergyman and Roman Catholic Archbishop of Tuam. He is known for his role in acquiring Spanish forces to assist the Irish in the Nine Years' War. He drowned in a shipwreck off Biscay whilst returning to Ireland with a Spanish reconnaissance expedition.

== Life and career ==
Ó hÉilidhe was ordained in Antwerp, and appointed Archbishop of Tuam by the Holy See on 20 March 1591.

=== Nine Years' War ===
By late 1592, the English Crown's continual advances into Ireland, as well as the recent executions of chieftains Hugh Roe MacMahon in 1590 and Brian O'Rourke in 1591 had created a fierce resentment in the Gaelic nobility and Irish Catholic clergy. Catholic priests were suffering harassment and imprisonment from English authorities, and Spain had been a refuge to the Irish Catholic clergy since the 1570s. Archbishop Edmund MacGauran, Primate of Ireland, returned from Spain with promises from King Philip II to support oppressed Irish Catholics if they proved themselves by launching prior military action. In December, a conference of seven northern bishops met in Tyrconnell. Tyrconnell's lord, Red Hugh O'Donnell, pledged his support to the Irish Catholic cause, and as a leading force of the emerging confederacy he began to work with MacGauran to secure Spanish support.

In 1593, Ó hÉilidhe was dispatched to Spain by O'Donnell and fellow Irish lord Hugh Maguire, with the aim of obtaining military assistance from the Spanish. He carried letters from O'Donnell, Maguire, Brian Oge O'Rourke and Archbishop Edmund MacGuaran. Ó hÉilidhe arrived in Spain in July, and was present at the Spanish court by September.

He met with councillor Don Juan de Idiáquez, the royal secretary, who supervised Philip II's dealings in the British Isles. At the Escorial, Ó hÉilidhe presented the Council of War "with a complete account of the warlike potential and strategic possibilities of the confederate Irish". He described the forces controlled by O'Donnell (3,000 men plus his maternal family's Redshank mercenaries), Maguire (2,000 men), O'Rourke (1,000 men) and the Burke family (1,000 men).

The archbishop emphasised to Idiáquez the persecution the Irish were suffering as fellow Catholics. He urgently requested between 8,000 and 10,000 Spanish soldiers to supplement Irish forces. Ó hÉilidhe was supported by émigré Maurice Fitzgerald and Lisbon exile Cornelius O'Mulrian, Bishop of Killaloe. Anglo-Irish loyalist Richard Stanyhurst was summoned so that the authenticity of Ó hÉilidhe's pleas could be verified, but Stanyhurst would not contradict Ó hÉilidhe's claims.

"The Irish archbishop of Tuam says that it will be of great importance for the success of the confederacy of Irish Catholics, that Your Majesty should write very affectionately to the earl of Tyrone, whose name is O’Neill to induce him to enter into the confederacy openly. He already belongs to it secretly, and he should be assured that Your Majesty’s aid shall not fail them. The archbishop begs Your Majesty to order a letter to be written to the earl to that effect."

— Idiáquez, in a note to Philip II

Philip II thought these demands were heavy, but ultimately felt pity for the plight of Irish Catholics. Idiáquez was instructed to give the Irish "the very smallest aid that will be needed. If it be so small that we can give it, we will help them." Idiáquez arranged for a ship to take Ó hÉilidhe, Spanish experts and Irish émigrés back to Ireland to gather intelligence and assist in the rebellion. The ship would be commanded by the highly regarded Captain Mérida, a "Spanish mulatto". Accompanying Ó hÉilidhe were Irishmen Thomas FitzGerald ("Don Tomás Geraldino") and John de Lacey ("Don Juan de Lacey"), who had served in the Spanish navy. According to a second-hand report in the Calendar of State Papers, 100 soldiers were also on board.

=== Shipwreck ===
The ship with Ó hÉilidhe set sail in March 1594, probably from Ferrol, but was shipwrecked in a sandbar off the coast of Santander, Cantabria, which halted any further lobbying.

According to Philip O'Sullivan Beare, Mérida docked the ship at Santander and, while waiting for a storm to subside, killed a man in a quarrel. He ordered Ó hÉilidhe and the crew to quickly depart so he could avoid arrest, but the ship was destroyed in the storm and all on board died. Historian Micheline Kerney Walsh has raised doubts on the trustworthiness of this account. Nevertheless, in a 1610 letter to Philip III, De Lacey's son mentions that the crew were "lost on the bar of Santander". Hiram Morgan and Darren McGettigan believe that Ó hÉilidhe indeed died in a shipwreck on the bay of Biscay in early 1594.

In the confusion, a Spanish barque was sent to Ireland to find Mérida and Ó hÉilidhe. In October 1594, their fates were still unclear to the Spanish administration, causing great concern in Spain.

The Calendar of State Papers mentions a ship from Waterford which was sent to find the missing crew. It travelled to Cádiz and arrived back in Ballyshannon on 2 January 1595, with no news.

== Death and legacy ==
Most sources give Seamus Ó hÉilidhe's death date as 25 September 1595. It is possible that this is simply the date that Ó hÉilidhe's death at sea was confirmed by authorities. Indeed, on this date Hugh O'Neill and O'Donnell wrote to the King of Spain referencing the failure of Ó hÉilidhe's mission: "By the timidity or negligence of the messengers our former letters have not reached you".

In his writings, O'Sullivan Beare described Ó hÉilidhe as "a man of approved learning and innocence of life".

Catholic Church titles
Preceded by Maol Muire Ó hÚigínn	Archbishop of Tuam; 1591–1595	Succeeded by Flaithri Ó Maolconaire
