= Tommaltach Ó Conchobair =

Irish archbishop

Tommaltach Ó Conchobair, Archbishop of Tuam 1258–1279.

Tommaltach Ó Conchobair was a descendant of Tairrdelbach Ua Conchobair, who reigned as King of Connacht from 1106 till his death at Dunmore, County Galway in 1156.

O Conchobair was elected archbishop of Tuam after 17 July 1258, but not translated from Elphin until 23 March 1259. Hereceived possession of the temporalities 20 July 1259. He died in office on 16 June 1279.

Preceded by Walter de Saleron	Archbishop of Tuam; 1257-1258	Succeeded by Nicol Mac Flainn
