= Felix Ua Ruanada =

Third Archbishop of Tuam, Ireland

- Archbishop
- Church: Church of Ireland
- Archdiocese: Tuam
- Installed: 1201
- Term ended: 1235
- Predecessor: Cadla Ua Dubthaig
- Successor: Máel Muire Ó Lachtáin

Personal details
- Died: 1238 Dublin, Ireland

Felix Ua Ruanada was the third Archbishop of Tuam, Ireland, 1201–1235.

The History of the Popes describes him as:

a Cistercian Monk, uncle of Roderic O'Conor, King of Ireland ... In 1235 he resigned his charge, and retired to St. Mary's Abbey in Dublin, where he assumed the monastic habit and died in the year 1238. His episcopal seal in engraved in Harris's Ware.

Preceded by Cadla Ua Dubthaig	Archbishop of Tuam; 1201–1235	Succeeded by Máel Muire Ó Lachtáin
