= Tomás Ó Maolalaidh =

Irish archbishop

Tomás Ó Maolalaidh (English: Thomas O'Mullally) (died 28 April 1536) was an Irish churchman who became Bishop of Clonmacnoise (c.1509-1514) and Archbishop of Tuam (1514–1536).

He held a synod at Galway in 1523, attended by bishops of Kilmacduagh, Achonry Clonmacnoise, Kilfenora, Ross, in addition to representatives of the dioceses of Elphin, Killala and Armagh. Died 28 April 1536 and buried in the Franciscan church of Galway under the same monument with his predecessor, Muiris Ó Fithcheallaigh. Succeeded by Christopher Bodkin, who was in turn succeeded by Dr William Ó Mullally, Protestant Archbishop of Tuam, son of Tomás.

Children

His son, William Ó Mullaly was formerly Dean of Tuam, and was nominated as Archbishop on 11 Nov 1572, and appointed by Queen Elizabeth I as Archbishop of Tuam. He was consecrated on 14 April 1573.

Other members of his immediate family included:

- Seán Ó Maolalaidh, Chief of the Name (died 1481) his father
- Conchobair Ó Maolalaidh, Bishop of Clonfert (1447–1448), Emly (1448–1449) and Elphin (1449–1468)
- Thomas Arthur, comte de Lally, baron de Tollendal (1702–1766)

Catholic Church titles
| Preceded by Walter Blake | Bishop of Clonmacnoise c.1509–1514 | Succeeded by Quintin Ó hUiginn |
| Preceded by Muiris Ó Fithcheallaigh | Archbishop of Tuam; 1514–1536 | Succeeded by Christopher Bodkin |
