= Donatus Ó Muireadhaigh =

Styles of Donatus Ó Muireadhaigh, O.S.A.
- Reference style: The Most Reverend
- Spoken style: Your Grace
- Religious style: Archbishop

Donatus Ó Muireadhaigh, O.S.A. (Anglicised: Donatus O'Murray; died 1485) was a fifteenth-century Archbishop of Tuam.

An Augustinian Canon, he was the Dean of Tuam before appointed Archbishop of Tuam by Pope Nicholas V on 2 December 1450. He granted the status of collegiate church to the St. Nicholas' Collegiate Church in Galway in 1484.

Archbishop Ó Muireadhaigh died in office on 17 January 1485.

== Notes ==
Catholic Church titles
Preceded by John MacSeonin Burke	Archbishop of Tuam; 1450–1485	Succeeded by Uilliam Seóighe
