= Stephen de Fulbourn =

English archbishop and official in Ireland

Blue plaque in Waterford showing his former residence.

Stephen de Fulbourn (died 3 July 1288) was an English-born cleric and politician in thirteenth-century Ireland: he was Justiciar of Ireland, and Archbishop of Tuam 1286–88. He was a member of the Order of Knights Hospitallers.

== Biography ==
A native of the village of Fulbourn, Cambridgeshire, he apparently did not attend University, but made a reputation as a skilled financier. De Fulbourn was translated to Tuam by a Papal bull dated 12 July 1286, having previously been Bishop of Waterford and Preceptor of Clerkenwell Priory, a foundation of the Knights Hospitallers. He was succeeded at Waterford by his brother Walter de Fulburn, who was Lord Chancellor of Ireland 1283-1288. He served as Treasurer of Ireland from 1274–77 and Justiciar of Ireland from 1281-88.

The History of the Popes states that his appointment took place:

after a long contest between the rival claims of two other candidates, who had been severally elected by different portions of the Chapter of Tuam. Fulburn was an Englishman, and a member of the Order of Knights Hospitallers; he twice filled the office of Lord Justice of Ireland. He held the see of Enachdune (Annaghdown) as well as that of Tuam; but not without serious opposition from a rival, John de Ufford, who had been elected Bishop and had received the King's confirmation of his appointment.

According to Otway-Ruthven, his tenure as Justiciar was plagued by accusations of corruption and inefficiency. How much truth there was in the charges is difficult to say: the activities of Stephen and his brother Walter, who acted as his Deputy, prompted an official inquiry in 1284, during which numerous charges and grievances were aired, including debasing the coinage by the issue of inferior pennies, and ransacking Dublin Castle for its valuables. Despite the serious nature of these charges, he remained Justiciar until his death. He was a man of considerable financial acumen, which was then the reason for making him Treasurer, and his success at moneymaking is not in itself proof that he was corrupt. The moving force behind many of the charges was Nicholas de Clere (or le Clerk), his successor as Treasurer. Nicholas was himself accused of corruption a few years later, and died in prison, having been unable to prove his innocence, or pay his debts to the English Crown. Some of the charges against him almost certainly originated with Stephen's relatives, seeking revenge (Stephen himself had died three years earlier).

Envy of the Fulbourn brothers' wealth and power no doubt played a part in the campaign against them: in 1285 the King received a report complaining that the brothers "were everything, and without them there is nothing".

Stephen gave his name to the steeping, a debased form of the sterling silver penny. The steeping was outlawed by Edward I.

Stephen was certainly a very wealthy man, whatever the origin of his fortune, as shown by the inventory of his possessions made after his death. The list of valuables was considered particularly striking in a man who had taken a vow of poverty. The valuables included rich items made of gold and silver, furs, fifteen horses, silk shoes and luxurious foodstuffs like figs and almonds.

De Fulbourn received possession of the temporalities of the Archdiocese of Tuam in September 1286. He died in Dublin on 3 July 1288 and was buried in Christ Church Cathedral, Dublin. His executor was Alexander of London, clerk.

Catholic Church titles
Preceded by Malachias Hibernicus	Archbishop of Tuam; 1286–1288	Succeeded by William de Bermingham
