= Flann Mac Flainn =

Irish bishop

Flann Mac Flainn was fifth Archbishop of Tuam, 1250–1256.

== Life ==
He was chancellor of Tuam, and sub-deacon to the pope when he was elected archbishop about May 1250; royal assent was given on 27 May, and seisin was granted on 25 July, but MacFlynn appears to have had to go to Rome, and he was not consecrated till 25 December 1250.

In the following year, like his predecessors, he endeavoured to obtain possession of the see of Ennachdune or Annaghdown in Galway, his opponent, Concord, was at first supported by the king, but MacFlynn eventually obtained confirmation. He held a synod at Tuam in 1251.

His episcopate was marked by some quarrels with Thomas, the bishop-elect of Achonry in 1251, and Thomas, bishop of Cionmacnoise in 1255.

The History of the Popes describes him as:

Chancellor of Tuam, having been elected by the Chapter, was confirmed by the King (i.e. Henry III of England), and subsequently by the Pope "on account of his great learning and wisdom" (Four Masters). He was consecrated at Tuam, on Christmas Day. During a vacancy of the see of Enachdune ... [he] took possession both of the spiritualities and temporalities, and retained them during his life. In the year 1255 he went over to England to confer with the King upon that and other Church matters; and appears to have succeeded in his objects; the Four Masters tell us, that "all the favours which were asked were honourably granted to him by the King. He died at Bristol on his return to Ireland, in 1256, leaving behind him a high character for learning and knowledge of the laws.

== See also ==
- Glynn (disambiguation)

Preceded by Felix Ua Ruanada	Archbishop of Tuam; 1250–1256	Succeeded by Walter de Saleron
