= Muiris Ó Fithcheallaigh =

Irish Franciscan theologian and Archbishop

Muiris Ó Fithcheallaigh, or Maurice O'Fihely, in Latin Mauritius de Portu Hibernicus or Mauritius Hibernicus; c. 1460 – 25 March 1513) was an Irish Franciscan theologian and Archbishop of Tuam. O'Fihely was an esteemed scholar.

== Life ==
According to James Lynch, Fihely was a native of Clonfert in Galway, but according to James Ware and Anthony à Wood he was a native of Baltimore, County Cork.

Benignus Millett OFM, suggests that he joined the Conventual Franciscans at Kilnalehin, and received his initial training in the studium attached to the friary. Later he studied at the University of Padua, where he obtained the degree of Doctor of Divinity.

In 1488, he was appointed regent of the Franciscan studium generale in Milan. On 1491 he was appointed professor of theology at Padua, a position he held through 1505. O'Fihely acted for some time as corrector of proofs to two well-known publishers at Venice, Scott and Locatelli — in the early days of printing a task usually entrusted to very learned men— and he was one of the first Irishmen to engage with the new technology of the printing press. O'Fihely was acknowledged as one of the most learned men of his time.

In 1506 he was appointed minister provincial of the Irish Franciscan province.

In 1506, he was appointed as Archbishop of Tuam and was consecrated at Rome by Pope Julius II. In 1513, he received a Scholastic Accolade from the Church, styled as Doctor Flos Mundi.

He did not return to Ireland till 1513, in the meantime attending as Archbishop of Tuam the first two sessions of the Fifth Lateran Council (1512). On leaving for Ireland to take formal possession of his see, O'Fihely procured from the pope an indulgence for all those who would be present at his first Mass in Tuam. However, he was destined not to reach Tuam, for he fell ill in Galway and died there in the Franciscan convent.

== Works ==
O'Fihely is chiefly known as the editor of many of the works of Duns Scotus. His learning and scholarship were held in very high esteem during his own time, and some of his notes on Duns Scotus were valued over a century later. He wrote a commentary on the works of Scotus which was printed at Venice about 1497. He dedicated his 1505 Enchiridion fidei to Gerald FitzGerald, 8th Earl of Kildare.

== Sources ==
- Ó hAodha, Ruairí, 'Maurice O'Fihely: Printer, Publisher and Archbishop of Tuam', in Journal of the Old Tuam Society Vol. 7. (Tuam: 2010)
