= Gerard Lally =

Gerard Lally or O'Mullally (? in Tuam, County Galway – 1737) was an Irish Jacobite and French military officer.

== Biography ==
Lally was the second son of Thomas Lally (or O'Mullally) of Tullaghnadaly, by his wife, Jane, sister of Theobald Dillon, 7th Viscount Dillon, and younger brother of James Lally. He served with James II's forces in Ireland during the Williamite War in Ireland, and after the end of the Siege of Limerick (1691) he fled to France.

At Romans on 18 April 1701 Lally married Anne-Marie, the daughter of Charles Jacques de Bressac, seigneur de La Vache; they had a son Thomas Arthur Lally. On 7 July 1707 Lally was created a baronet, in the Jacobite baronetage of Ireland, by James II's son, the titular James III.

On 28 July 1708 he was made Lieutenant Colonel of the famous Dillon's Regiment, named after his first cousin General Arthur Dillon. On 20 February 1734 he was made a Brigadier General in the French army, with the promise of being appointed a Maréchal de camp at the next promotion. He died at Arras in November 1737, and was succeeded by his son.

His grandson was Gérard de Lally-Tollendal.

Baronetage of Ireland
New creation	— TITULAR — Baronet; Jacobite baronetcy 1707–1737	Succeeded by Thomas Arthur Lally
