= Marquis de Lally-Tollendal =

The family of Lally (also O'Lally or O'Mullally) were an Irish family originally from Tuam, County Galway, who distinguished themselves in the service of the Jacobite pretenders and in the French army.

== Titles ==
Gerard Lally of Tullynadala was appointed a Baronet in the Baronetage of Ireland by the titular King James III and VIII (the "Old Pretender") on 7 July 1707. He was succeeded by his son, Thomas Arthur, who took part in the Jacobite rising of 1745. Upon his return to France in 1746, he was appointed Earl of Moenmoyne, Viscount Ballymole and Baron Tollendally, in the Peerage of Ireland, by the Stuart claimant.

These titles were never recognised by the government in Great Britain (see Jacobite peerage). In about 1755, he was also named Comte de Lally and Baron de Tollendal by King Louis XV, although this may have been merely a recognition of his Jacobite title.

== Execution ==
Thomas Arthur, comte de Lally was executed in 1766, but formally pardoned posthumously in 1778. A legend about his execution circulated in the following years, resurrected by A.C.H. Smith in his 2000 novel The Dangerous Memoir of Citizen Sade. Herein, the author had the Marquis de Sade remembering that before the introduction of the guillotine we were burned, or impaled, or broken, when it was our right as noblemen to demand the axe, until they botched Lally-Tollendal and he danced around for half a minute trying to hold his head on.

== Heir ==
His only son, Trophime Gérard, was an émigré during the French Revolution, but after the Bourbon Restoration was named (21 March 1815) Marquis de Lally-Tollendal and a Peer of France. He died on 11 March 1830, whereupon all titles passed to his daughter's estate.

== Baronets (1707) ==
- Sir Gerard Lally, 1st Baronet (died 1737)
- Sir Thomas Arthur Lally, 2nd Baronet (1702–1766), created Earl of Moenmoyne in 1746

== Earls of Moenmoyne (1746) and Comtes de Lally (c. 1755) ==
- Thomas Arthur Lally, 1st Comte de Lally (1702–1766)
- Trophime Gérard de Lally, 2nd Comte de Lally (1751–1830), created Marquis de Lally-Tollendal in 1815

== Marquis de Lally-Tollendal (1815) ==
- Trophime Gérard de Lally, Marquis de Lally-Tollendal (1751–1830)

== See also ==
- Jacobite Peerage
