= Archbishop of Tuam =

Archiepiscopal title in Ireland

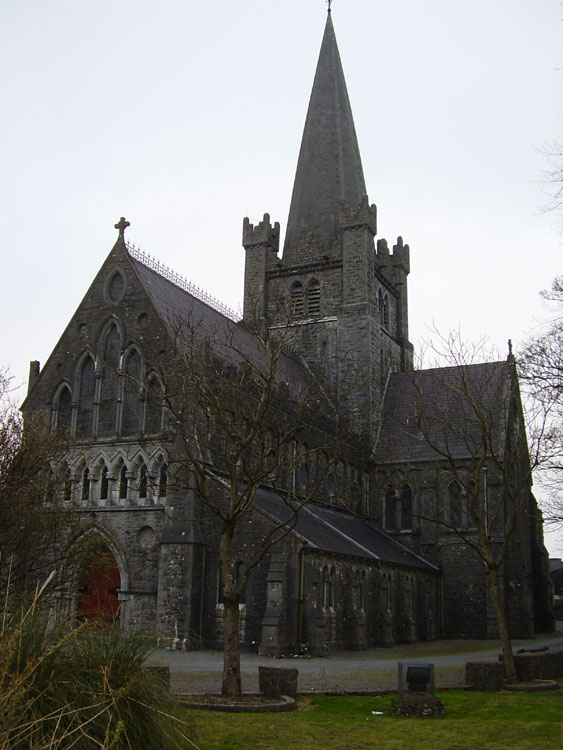
The Cathedral Church of St Mary, Tuam, the former episcopal seat of the Catholic archbishops, now used by the Church of Ireland.

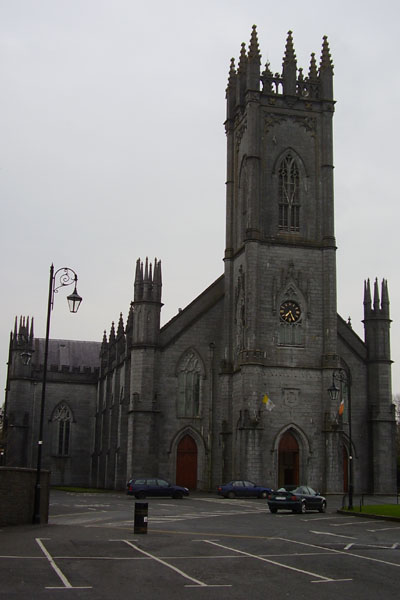
The Cathedral Church of the Assumption of the Blessed Virgin Mary, Tuam, the episcopal seat of the Catholic archbishops.

The Archbishop of Tuam (/ˈtjuːəm/ TEW-əm; Irish: Ard-Easpag Thuama) is an archbishop which takes its name after the town of Tuam in County Galway, Ireland. The title was used by the Church of Ireland until 1839, and is still in use by the Catholic Church.

== History ==
At the Synod of Rathbreasail in 1111, Tuam was named as the seat of a diocese corresponding roughly with the diocese of Elphin, whilst Cong was chosen as the seat of a diocese corresponding with the later archdiocese of Tuam in west Connacht. There is no record of any bishops of Cong, and no bishop was given the title "bishop of Tuam" in the Irish annals before 1152. However the annals recorded some "archbishops/bishops of Connacht" such as Cathasach Ua Conaill (died 1117), Domhnall Ua Dubhthaigh (1117–1136), Muireadhach Ua Dubhthaigh (1136–1150) – the latter was succeeded by Áed Ua hOissín. At the Synod of Kells in 1152, the archdiocese of Tuam was established with six suffragan dioceses.

During the Reformation, the bishopric of Annaghdown was annexed to Tuam in c. 1555. After the Reformation, there were parallel apostolic successions: one of the Church of Ireland and the other of the Catholic Church.

In the Church of Ireland

In 1569, the Church of Ireland bishopric of Mayo was annexed to the archbishopric. Between the seventeenth and nineteenth centuries, a number of other bishoprics were also united to the archbishopric. The bishopric of Kilfenora was united to Tuam from 1661 to 1742, Ardagh from 1742 to 1839, and Killala and Achonry from 1834.

On the death of Archbishop Le Poer Trench in 1839, the Ecclesiastical Province of Tuam lost its metropolitan status and became the united bishopric of Tuam, Killala and Achonry in the Province of Armagh.

In the Catholic Church

After an unsettled period in the mid to late sixteenth century, the Catholic archbishopric has had a consistent succession of archbishops. In 1631, the Catholic bishopric of Mayo was formally joined to Tuam by papal decree.

The current archbishop is the Most Reverend Francis Duffy who was announced as the new archbishop of Tuam by the Holy See on 10 November 2021 and subsequently installed on 9 January 2022. The archbishop's residence is the Archbishop's House, Tuam, County Galway, Ireland.

== Pre-Reformation archbishops ==
Pre-Reformation Archbishops of Tuam
From	Until	Incumbent	Notes
1152	1161	Áed Ua h-Oissín	Became the first Archbishop of Tuam at the Synod of Kells in 1152, where he received the pallium from Cardinal Giovanni Paparoni, the Papal Legate; died in office; also known as Hugh O'Hession, or Edanus
bef.1167	1201	Cadla Ua Dubthaig	Became archbishop before 1167; died in office at Cong Abbey in 1201; also known as Cathal O'Duffy, Cadhla O'Dublai, or Catholicus
1202	1235	Felix Ua Ruanada, O.S.A.	Became archbishop in 1202; resigned as archbishop on 23 March 1235 and retired to St. Mary's Abbey, Dublin; died 1238; also known as Felix O'Ruadain; his nephew was Ruaidrí Ua Conchobair, High King of Ireland
1236	1249	Máel Muire Ó Lachtáin	Formerly Dean of Tuam; elected archbishop before 6 April 1236 and consecrated in the same year; died in office before 25 December 1249; also known as Marianus, or Mael-Murry O'Laghnan
1250	1256	Flann Mac Flainn	Formerly Chancellor of Tuam; elected archbishop before 27 May 1250; received possession of the temporalities on 25 July 1250; consecrated on 25 December 1250; died in office before 29 June 1256; also known as Florentius, Florence MacFlynn, Florence Floin, or Fiacha O'Flyn
1257	1258	Walter de Saleron	Formerly Dean of St Paul's, London (1254–1257); elected archbishop on 29 May and consecrated on 6 September 1257; received possession of the temporalities on 6 November 1257; died in office before 22 April 1258; also known as Walter de London
1258	1279	Tommaltach Ó Conchobair	Elected archbishop of Tuam after 17 July 1258, but not translated from Elphin until 23 March 1259; received possession of the temporalities on 20 July 1259; died in office 16 June 1279; also known as Thomas O'Conor
1283		(Nicol Mac Flainn)	Elected before 20 October 1283, but never consecrated
1280		(Malachias Hibernicus)	Elected on 22 April 1280, never officially installed
1286	1288	Stephen de Fulbourn	Translated from Waterford; appointed on 12 July and received possession of the temporalities on 15 September 1286; died in office on 3 July 1288; also known as Stephen of Fulburn
1288	1312	William de Bermingham	Elected c. late 1288, appointed on 2 May 1289 and received possession of the temporalities on 29 September 1289; died in office in January 1312
1312	1348	Máel Sechlain Mac Áeda	Elected archbishop of Tuam c. March 1312, but not translated from Elphin until 19 December 1312; received possession of the temporalities on 1 April 1313; died in office on 10 August 1348; also known as Malachias or Malachi MacHugh
1348	1365	Tomás MacCearbhaill	Formerly Archdeacon of Cashel; appointed archbishop on 26 November 1348 and received possession of the temporalities on 6 October 1349; translated to Cashel before 8 March 1365; also known as Thomas MacCarwill or O'Carrol
1364	1371	Eóin Ó Gráda	Formerly Archdeacon of Cashel; appointed archbishop after 20 November 1364 and received possession of the temporalities on 19 July 1365; died in office on 19 September 1371; also known as John O'Grada or O'Grady
1372	1383	Gregorius Ó Mocháin I	Translated from Elphin on 7 May 1372 and received possession of the temporalities on 24 November 1372; died in office in 1383; also known as Gregory O'Moghan or O'Mahon
1384	1386	Gregorius Ó Mocháin II	Appointed c. 1384 by Avignon Pope Clement VII; deprived on 5 May 1386 by Pope Urban VI; died in 1392; also known as Gregory O'Moghan or O'Mahon
1386	1393	Uilliam Ó Cormacáin	Appointed on 5 May 1386 by Pope Urban VI; translated to Clonfert on 27 January 1393; also known as William O'Cormacain
1393	1407	Muircheartach mac Pilib Ó Ceallaigh	Elected archbishop of Tuam in the summer of 1392, but not translated from Clonfert until 26 January 1393; died in office on 29 September 1407; also known as Maurice O'Kelly
1408	1410	John Babingle, O.P.	Appointed before 25 October 1408 by Pope Gregory XII, and 2 September 1409 by Antipope Alexander V; confirmed on 25 May 1410 by Antipope John XXIII; appointed later to Achonry in 1410
1411		(Cornelius, O.F.M.)	Appointed on 7 October 1411, but did not take effect
1411	1430	See vacant	
1430	1437	Sean Mac Feorais	Appointed on 7 June and consecrated after 5 December 1430; died in office in 1437; also known as John Winfield
1438	1441	Tomás mac Muircheartaigh Ó Ceallaigh, O.P.	Translated Clonfert in 1438, but did not get possession of the see; also known as Thomas O'Kelly
1441	1450	John MacSeonin Burke, O.S.A.	Appointed on 9 October 1441 and consecrated c. November or December 1441; died in office before December 1450; also known as John Burke
1450	1485	Donatus Ó Muireadhaigh, O.S.A.	Appointed on 2 December and consecrated after that date; died in office on 17 January 1485; also known as Donatus O'Murray
1483		(Walter Blake fitz John)	Appointed on 8 August 1483, but did not take effect; later appointed to Clonmacnoise on 26 March 1487
1485	1501	Uilliam Seóighe	Appointed on 16 May 1485 and consecrated in 1487; died in office on 20 or 28 December 1501; also known as William Joyce
1503		Philip Pinson, O.F.M.	Appointed on 2 December 1503, however, died of the plague at Rome on 5 December 1503
1503	1506	See vacant	
1506	1513	Muiris Ó Fithcheallaigh, O.F.M.	Appointed on 26 June 1506; attended the Fifth Council of the Lateran in 1512; died in office at Galway on 25 May 1513; buried in the Franciscan Convent of Galway; also known as Maurice O'Fihely or Maurice de Portu
1514	1536	Tomás Ó Maolalaidh	Translated from Clonmacnoise on 19 June 1514; died in office on 28 April 1536; buried at Galway, in the same tomb with his immediate predecessor; also known as Thomas O'Mullally

== Archbishops during the Reformation ==
Archbishops of Tuam during the Reformation
From	Until	Incumbent	Notes
1537	1572	Christopher Bodkin	Appointed Church of Ireland archbishop by King Henry VIII on 15 February 1537; also was Bishop of Kilmacduagh 1533–1572; absolved from schism by Cardinal Pole and appointed apostolic administrator of Tuam and Kilmacduagh on 7 October 1555. He took the Oath of Supremacy, recognizing Queen Elizabeth I as Supreme Governor of the Church, in 1560. Papal legate Fr David Wolfe SJ described as an "adherent of the Queen" and "in good repute with all, even with his enemies" and commended that "Mass is sung and said, and he himself is daily in the choir". died in office in 1572.
1538	1555	Arthur O'Friel	Appointed Catholic archbishop by the Holy See on 7 October 1538 in opposition to Bodkin, but was unable to get possession of the see; not known if he was ever consecrated; resigned when Bodkin was absolved in 1555; died c. 1573

== Post-Reformation archbishops ==
=== Church of Ireland succession ===
Church of Ireland Archbishops of Tuam
From	Until	Incumbent	Notes
1573	1595	William O'Mullally (Irish: Uilliam Ó Maolalaidh)	Formerly Dean of Tuam; nominated on 11 November 1572; consecrated in April 1573; died in office
1595	1609	Nehemiah Donnellan (Irish: Fearganainm Ó Domhnalláin)	Nominated on 24 May and appointed by letters patent on 17 May 1595; voluntarily resigned in 1609, and dying soon afterwards at Tuam; buried at St Mary's Cathedral, Tuam
1609	1628	William Daniel (Irish: Uilliam Ó Domhnuill)	Nominated on 28 June and consecrated on 2 August 1609; died in office on 11 July 1628; his was the translator of the New Testament and of the Book of Common Prayer; also recorded as William O'Donnell
1629	1638	Randolph Barlow	Formerly of Dean of Christ Church, Dublin and Archdeacon of Meath; nominated on 6 February and consecrated in April 1629; died in office on 22 February 1638; also known as Ralph Barlow
1638	1645	Richard Boyle	Translated from Cork, Cloyne and Ross; nominated on 2 April and appointed by letters patent on 30 May 1638; died in office on 19 March 1645
1645	1647	John Maxwell	Translated from Killala and Achonry; appointed by letters patent on 30 August 1645; died in office on 14 February 1647
1647	1661	See vacant	
1661	1667	Samuel Pullen	Nominated on 3 August 1660 and appointed by letters patent on 27 January 1661; died in office on 24 January 1667
1667	1679	John Parker	Translated from Elphin; nominated on 26 February and appointed by letters patent on 9 August 1667; translated to Dublin on 28 February 1679
1679	1716	John Vesey	Translated from Limerick, Ardfert and Aghadoe; nominated on 23 January and appointed by letters patent on 18 March 1679; died in office on 28 March 1716
1716	1741	Edward Synge	Translated from Raphoe; nominated on 19 May and appointed by letters patent on 8 June 1716; died in office on 23 July 1741; his son Edward was bishop of Clonfert & Kilmacduagh (1730–32), Cloyne (1732–34), Ferns & Leighlin (1734–40), and Elphin (1740–62)
1742	1751	Josiah Hort	Translated from Kilmore and Ardagh; nominated on 5 January and appointed by letters patent on 27 January 1742; died in office on 14 December 1751
1752	1775	John Ryder	Translated from Down and Connor; nominated on 24 February and appointed on 19 March 1752; died in office on 4 February 1775
1775	1782	Jemmett Browne	Translated from Elphin; appointed by letters patent on 11 April 1775; died in office in June 1782
1782	1794	Joseph Deane Bourke	Translated from Ferns and Leighlin; appointed by letters patent on 8 August 1782; also became the 3rd Earl of Mayo in 1792; died in office on 20 August 1794
1794	1819	William Beresford	Translated from Ossory; appointed by letters patent on 10 October 1794; also was created the 1st Baron Decies in 1812; died in office on 8 September 1819
1819	1839	Power Le Poer Trench	Translated from Elphin; appointed by letters patent on 10 November 1819; died in office on 25 March 1839
Since 1839, the Church of Ireland see has been part of the united bishopric of Tuam, Killala and Achonry

=== Catholic succession ===
Catholic Archbishops of Tuam
From	Until	Incumbent	Notes
1572	1580	See vacant	
1580	1583	Nicholas Skerrett	Appointed on 17 October 1580; died in office in February 1583
1586	1590	Maol Muire Ó hÚigínn	Appointed on 24 March 1586; died in office c. 1590; known in English as Miler O'Higgin
1591	1595	Seamus Ó hÉilidhe	Appointed on 20 March 1591; died in office in 1595; known in English as James O'Hely
1595	1609	See vacant	
1609	1629	Flaithri Ó Maolconaire, O.F.M	Appointed on 30 March and consecrated on 3 May 1609; died in office in November 1629; known in English as Florence Conry
1630	1645	Malachy O'Queely	Appointed on 28 June and consecrated on 10 October 1630; died in office on 25 October 1645; also known as Malachias O'Queely
1647	1667	John de Burgh	Translated from Clonfert on 11 March 1647; died in office on 4 April 1667; also recorded as John de Burgo and John Burke
1669	1713	James Lynch	Appointed on 11 January and consecrated on 16 May 1669; died in office on 31 October 1713
1713	1723	Francis Burke	Appointed coadjutor archbishop of Tuam on 22 August, succeeded as archbishop on 31 October 1713, and consecrated on 4 April 1714; died in office before September 1723
1723	1740	Bernard O'Gara	Appointed on 23 December 1723 and consecrated on 24 May 1724; died in office c. June 1740
1740	1748	Michael O'Gara	Appointed on 19 September 1740; died in office in 1748
1749	1785	Michael Skerrett	Translated from Killala on 5 May 1749; died in office on 19 August 1785
1785	1787	Philip Phillips	Translated from Achonry on 22 November 1785; died in office in September 1787
1787	1798	Boetius Egan	Translated from Achonry on 15 December 1787 with papal brief 4 June 1788; died in office on 25 January 1798
1798	1809	Edward Dillon	Translated from Kilmacduagh and Kilfenora on 19 November 1798; died in office on 13 or 30 August 1809
1815	1834	Oliver Kelly	Appointed on 4 October 1814 and consecrated on 12 March 1815; died in office on 18 April 1834
1834	1881	John MacHale	Appointed from Killala on 26 August 1834; died in office on 7 November 1881
1881	1902	John McEvilly	Appointed coadjutor archbishop of Tuam on 2 February 1878, and succeeded as archbishop on 7 November 1881; also was Bishop of Galway (1857–1881) and Apostolic Administrator of Kilmacduagh & Kilfenora (1866–1883); died in office on 26 November 1902
1903	1918	John Healy	Translated from Clonfert on 13 February 1903; died in office on 19 March 1918
1918	1939	Thomas Gilmartin	Translated from Clonfert on 10 July 1918; died in office on 14 October 1939
1940	1969	Joseph Walsh	Appointed an auxiliary bishop of Tuam on 16 December 1937 and consecrated on 2 January 1938; appointed archbishop of Tuam on 16 January 1940; retired on 31 January 1969; died on 20 June 1972
1969	1987	Joseph Cunnane	Appointed on 31 January and consecrated on 17 March 1969; retired on 11 July 1987; died on 8 March 2001
1987	1994	Joseph Cassidy	Translated from Clonfert on 22 August 1987; resigned as archbishop on 28 June 1994, but continued as apostolic administrator of the archdiocese until 5 March 1995
1995	2021	Michael Neary	Appointed an auxiliary bishop of Tuam on 20 May 1992 and received episcopal ordination on 13 September 1992; appointed archbishop of Tuam on 17 January 1995 and installed on 5 March 1995; retired on 10 November 2021
2021	present	Francis Duffy	Translated from Ardagh and Clonmacnoise on 10 November 2021 and installed on 9 January 2022

== Bibliography ==
- Cotton, Henry (1850). The Province of Connaught. Fasti Ecclesiae Hiberniae: The Succession of the Prelates and Members of the Cathedral Bodies of Ireland. Vol. 4. Dublin: Hodges and Smith.
- Fryde, E. B.; Greenway, D. E.; Porter, S.; Roy, I., eds. (1986). Handbook of British Chronology (3rd, reprinted 2003 ed.). Cambridge: Cambridge University Press. ISBN 0-521-56350-X.
- Moody, T. W.; Martin, F. X.; Byrne, F. J., eds. (1984). Maps, Genealogies, Lists: A Companion to Irish History, Part II. New History of Ireland. Vol. XI. Oxford: Oxford University Press. ISBN 0-19-821745-5.
