= Gérard de Lally-Tollendal =

French politician and philanthropist

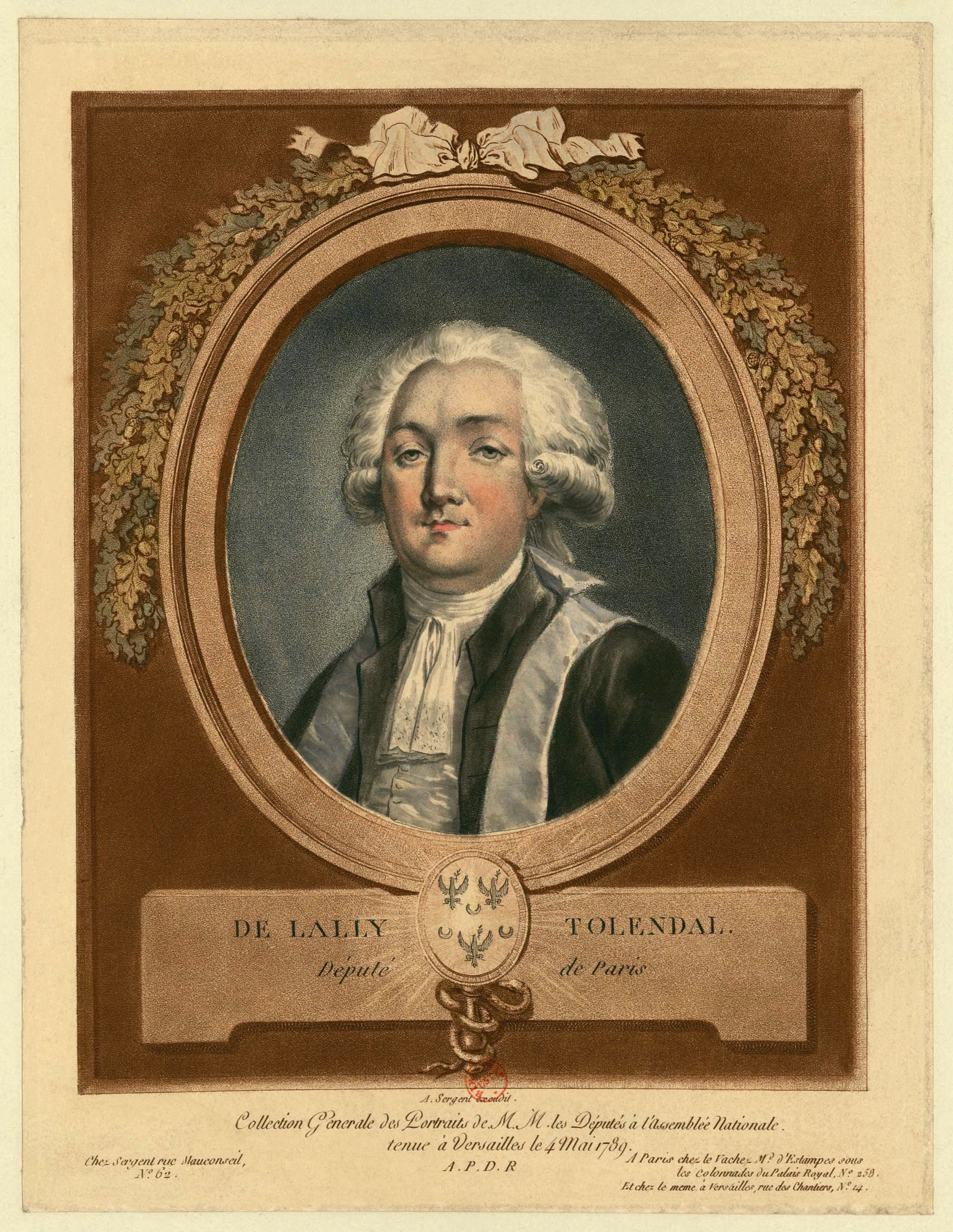
Marquis de Lally-Tollendal, deputy to the Estates-General of 1789

Trophime-Gérard, marquis de Lally-Tollendal (5 March 1751 – 11 March 1830) was a French politician and philanthropist.

Born in Paris into an old aristocratic family, he was the legitimized son of Thomas Arthur de Lally, who served as viceroy in India under King Louis XIV, and only discovered the secret of his birth on the day of his father's execution (9 May 1766), when he devoted himself to clearing his father's memory. He was supported by Voltaire, and in 1778 succeeded in persuading King Louis XVI to annul the decree which had sentenced the Comte de Lally, but the parlement of Rouen, to which the case was referred back, in 1784 again decided in favour of Lally's guilt. The case was retried by other courts, and Lally's innocence was never fully admitted by the French judges.

In 1779 Lally-Tollendal bought the honorary title of Grand bailli of Étampes, and in 1789 was a deputy to the Estates-General for the noblesse of Paris. He played some part in the early stages of the French Revolution, but, as a conservative, quickly rejected more profound changes.

== Early life ==
Trophime Gerard Lally-Tollendal was born into an old aristocratic family on 5 March 1751. Although he was the legitimate son of Thomas Arthur Lally, he was kept unaware of his Irish heritage through his bringing up under the name Trophime. He learned of his ancestry the day of his own father's execution on May 9, 1766. After his father's execution, Lally-Tollendal spent most of his adult life fighting to clear his father's name. During this time he attended the College of Harcourt which allowed him to gain the skills needed to not only fight against his father's verdict but participate in French government.

== Fighting for his father's innocence ==
Trophime's introduction into the French political world was through his constant fight to prove his father's innocence. Lally-Tollendal first began this investigation when he was only 19 years old. He sought the help of Voltaire for his influence and strengths in writing. He first approached Voltaire in 1770 via a letter outlining every injustice and false accusation made against his father. Unfortunately, at the time, Trophime Gérard de Lally-Tollendal was considered Thomas Arthur's illegitimate son. This disqualified him from defending his father in a court of law. In 1772, Trophime achieved his legitimacy and the process of clearing his father's name officially began.

The outcome of the Thomas Arthur case is unclear. Some sources record that Thomas Arthur's case was reopened and retried more than 3 times. Although the King and his Council ruled in favor of Thomas Arthur's innocence, courts across the different provinces of France declared him guilty time and time again.

Other sources state that King Louis XVI single-handedly repealed the guilty verdict while similar sources state that along with Louis XVI, the King's Council gathered over the case and had a majority vote in support of Thomas Arthur's innocence.

What is certain is that Thomas Arthur's innocence was never officially recorded.

== Politics ==
At the beginning of the Revolution, Lally-Tollendal was in support of a Revolution and supported the Marquis de Lafayette. But, as the Revolution progressed, Lally-Tollendal's own conservative ideologies prevented him from continuing his support. As a result, he became in full support of Le Ancien Régime and France's traditional institutions.

Trophime Gérard de Lally-Tollendal was in favor of King Louis XVI even under the circumstances of the French Revolution. Throughout the Revolution, Lally-Tollendal remained entirely loyal to the King and even risked his life in an attempt to defend the King during his trial.

Lally-Tollendal was also part of Clermont-Tonnerre's Monarchist Club. One of the first issues this club experienced was the Constituent Assembly's refusal to declare Catholicism as France's national religion. As well as being part of Clermont-Tonnerre's Monarchist Club, Lally-Tollendal, Clermont-Tonnerre, Bertrand de Molleville, and Malouet all plotted to help save the King from hiding on 10 August 1792. Unfortunately all of the men were recognized on the street and hunted down. They all fled to the Hôtel of Madame de Brassac where Clermont-Tonnerre was ultimately killed.

Although Lally-Tollendal supported the King, he also was in support of a government with three bodies. This new government would consist of a Senate, Chamber of Representatives, and the reigning King. Each legislative body would have the power to veto but ultimately the King's vetoes held more weight. These legislative bodies would be put in place in order to create a governmental balance to ensure equal distribution of power.

== Exile and return ==
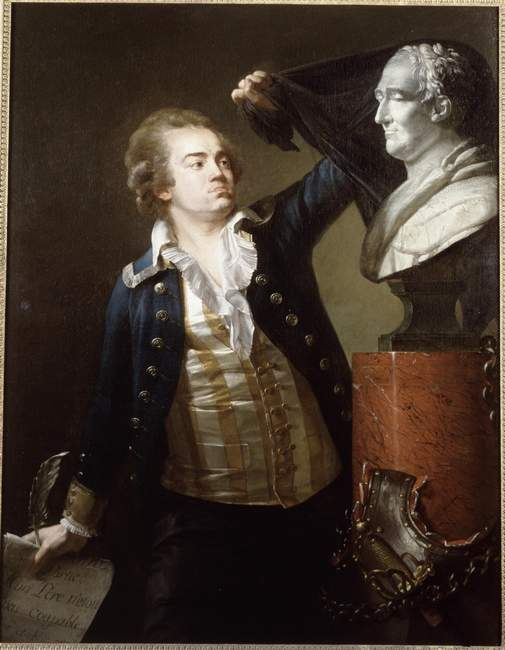
Portrait of Lally-Tollendal, 1787 (Musée de la Révolution française).

In 1792 Lally-Tollendal was arrested but managed to emigrate to England prior to the September Massacres. He joined the opposition to the strict regime of the Marquis de Mirabeau, and condemned the decisive rejection of the Ancien Régime by the National Constituent Assembly, begun by the Tennis Court Oath and confirmed by the abolition of feudalism on 4 August 1789. Later in the year he emigrated to Great Britain.

During the trial of Louis XVI by the National Convention (December 1792 - January 1793) he offered to defend the king, but was not allowed to return to France. He did not return until after the establishment of the Consulate. Louis XVIII honoured him with the title of Peer of France, and in 1816 he became a member of the Académie française.

From that time until his death, he devoted himself to philanthropic work, especially identifying himself with prison reform. He died in Paris on March 11, 1830.

== Family ==
He married a Scottish girl: Miss Halket of Pitfirran, a noted singer in Edinburgh.

== Works ==
- Essai sur quelques changements qu’on pourrait faire dès à présent dans les lois criminelles de France, 1787
- Pièces justificatives contenant differentes motives et opinions, 1789
- Rapport sur le gouvernement qui convient à la France, 1789
- Lettre à ses commettants, 1789
- Brief van Marquis Trophime Gérard de Lally- Tollendal aan J. Necker, 1789
- Quintius Capitolinus aux Romains: extrait du troisième livre de Tite-Live, 1790
- Adresse de M. de Lally-Tollendal aux Français, ou, La dinde à la broche, la poule au pot & la grande pinte, servis ensemble sur les tables du peuple, 1790
- Mémoire de M. le Comte de Lally-Tollendal, ou Seconde lettre à ses commettans, 1790
- Lettre Ecrite par M. le Comte de Lally-Tollendal, à une de ses amies, 1790
- Lettre écrite au très honorable Edmund Burke ecuier, membre du parlement d'Angleterre, 1791
- Post-scriptum d’une lettre à M. Burke, 1792
- Plaidoier du comte de Lally-Tolendal pour Louis XVI, 1793
- Songe d'un Anglais fidèle à sa patrie et à son roi, 1793
- Reponse du Comte de Lally Tolendal, a M. L'Abbé D..., grand vicaire, 1793
- Mémoire au roi de Prusse pour réclamer la liberté de La Fayette, 1795
- Le Comte de Strafford, tragédie en 5 actes et en vers, 1795
- Défense des émigrés français adressée au peuple français, 1797
- Mémoires, attributed to Joseph Weber, concerning Marie Antoinette (1804, partial authorship)
- Essai sur la vie de T. Wentworth, comte de Strafford, principal ministre du roi Charles Ier. Et sur l'histoire generale d'Angleterre, d'Écosse et d'Irelande a cette époque, 1814
