= Bishop of Clonmacnoise =

Catholic ecclesial title in Ireland

Bishop of Clonmacnoise was the ordinary of the Roman Catholic episcopal see based at Clonmacnoise, County Offaly, Ireland. The bishops of Clonmacnoise (Old Irish: Cluain Moccu Nóis) appear in the records for the first time in the 9th century, although inferior in status to the Abbot of Clonmacnoise until the reformation of the Irish Church in the 12th century. After the Reformation, there were several parallel bishops placed by the Church of Ireland until the Diocese of Clonmacnoise was merged with Diocese of Meath to form the Diocese of Meath and Kildare in 1569. In the Roman Catholic Church, separate bishops continued longer. The diocese came under the administration of the Bishop of Ardagh between 1688 and 1725, before the provision of Stephen MacEgan in 1725. Although MacEgan was translated to Meath in 1729, he continued to administer Clonmacnoise separately until his death in 1756, after which the see was finally merged into the Roman Catholic Diocese of Ardagh and Clonmacnoise.

== List of bishops of Clonmacnoise ==
Tenure	Incumbent	Notes
d. 713	Fáilbe Bec	
d. 889	Tuathchar	
d. 890	Máel Odar	
d. 904	Cairpre Cromm	
d. 919	Loingsech	
d. 922	Fer Dálach	
d. 942	Dúnchad mac Suthainén	
d. 949	Óenucán mac Écertaig	
d. 955	Dúnadach mac Écertaig	
d. 971	Tuathal	
d. 971	Máenach mac Máel Míchil	
d. 979	Flann mac Máel Míchil	
d. 998	Conaing ua Coscraig	
d. 1001	Máel Póil	
d. 1010	Conaing mac Áedacáin	
d. 1037	Flaithbertach mac Loingsig	
d. 1067	Célechair Mugdornach mac Cuinn na mBocht	
d. 1104	Gilla Críst Ua hEchtigirn	
d. 1105	Muiredach Ua Máel Dúin	
c. 1111–1136	Domnall mac Flannacáin Ua Dubthaig	Abbot of Roscommon and Bishop of Elphin.
x1152–1187	Muirchertach Ua Máel Uidir	
?–1207	Cathal Ua Máel Eóin	
1207–1214	Muiredach Ua Muirecén	
1214–1220	Áed Ua Máel Eóin (I)	
1220–1227	Máel Ruanaid Ua Modáin	Resigned in 1227; died 1230.
1227–1236	Áed Ua Máel Eóin (II)	
1236–c. 1252	Thomas Fitz Patrick	
1252–1278	Tomás Ua Cuinn	O. F. M.
1280–1289	Anonymous	O. F. M..
elected 1282	Gilbert	Blinded, and never consecrated.
1290–1297	Uilliam Ua Dubthaig	O. F. M..
1298–1302	Uilliam Ua Finnéin	O. Cist.
1302–?	Domhnall Ua Bráein	O. F. M..
?–1337	Lughaidh Ua Dálaigh	
1337–x1368	Henry	O. P.
provided 1349	Simon	O. P.; provided 11 May 1349; election did not take effect.
1369–1371	Richard Braybroke	
1371–1380x	Hugh	
?–1388	Philip Ó Maoil	Resigned 30 January 1388; died 1420.
1388–1397	Milo Corr	O. F. M..
1397–1423	Philip Nangle	O. Cist..
provided 1423	David Prendergast	O. Cist.; provided on 24 September 1423, but the provision did not take effect.
1425–1444	Cormac Mac Cochláin	
1444–1487	Seaán Ó Dálaigh	
1449	Thomas	On 27 October 1449 Pope Nicholas V allowed Bishop Thomas to hold this see in commendam; nothing more is known.
provided 1458	William	O. S. A.; provided on 14 July 1458. Not known to have held the see physically, but acted as a suffragan in the diocese of Durham .
1480–1486	James	
1487–1508	Walter Blake	
c. 1509–1514	Tomás Ó Maolalaidh	O. F. M.; translated to the archbishopric of Tuam.
1516–1539	Quintin Ó hUiginn	O. F. M.; also write Quintin O'Higgins
1539	Richard Hogan	O. F. M..
1539–c. 1555	Florence Kirwan	O. F. M..
1556–1568	Peter Wall	O. F. M..; for later Bishops of the Church of Ireland see Bishop of Meath
1585–?	Alan Sullivan	
From 1630	Terence Coghlan	Vicar Apostolic only.
1647–1657	Anthony MacGeoghegan	O. F. M.; translated to the bishopric of Meath.
From 1657	William O'Shiel	Vicar Apostolic only.
From 1683	Moriarty Kearney	Vicar Apostolic only.
1688–c. 1698	Gregory Fallon	
1725–1729/1756	Stephen MacEgan	O. P.; Although MacEgan was translated to Meath in 1729, he continued to administer Clonmacnoise separately until his death in 1756, after which the see was finally merged into the Roman Catholic Diocese of Ardagh and Clonmacnoise.
