= Naughton =

Naughton Irish name: Ó Neachtain
- Pronunciation: /ˈnɔːtən/ or /ˈnɔːxtən/
- Language: Irish

Origin
- Meaning: Descendant of Nechtan
- Region of origin: County Galway, Ireland

Other names
- Variant forms: Quinn, Hartigan, Norton and Behan

Naughton (/ˈnɔːtən/ or /ˈnɔːxtən/) is an Irish Gaelic surname derived from the name Ó Neachtain meaning 'descendant of Nechtan'. A Sept of the Dal gCais of the same stock as Quinn and Hartigan where located in Inchiquin Barony, County Clare.

Another O'Neachtain Sept of the Uí Maine who were chiefs of Máenmag, the plain lying around Loughrea in Galway, until the Cambro-Norman invasion. After the upheaval they settled in the Fews (Barony of Athlone, County Roscommon). O'Neachtain appears as Chief of the Fews in several sixteenth-century manuscripts, and as late as the 1880s the Naughtons of Thomastown Park possessed an estate of 4,829 acres (19.54 km^{2}) between Athlone and Ballinasloe.

The English surname Norton has occasionally been substituted for Naughton. The Nortons of Athlone are descended from Feradach O'Neachtain who died in 1790. In County Kerry, Behan or Behane was used interchangeably with Naughton.

== Places ==
- Naughton, Fife, Scotland
- Naughton, Ontario, Canada
- Naughton, Suffolk, England
- Naughton Park
- Naughton Gallery at Queen's
- Naughton Township, Burleigh County, North Dakota

== Surname of people ==
- Aaron Naughton (born 1999), Australian rules footballer
- Albert Naughton (1929–2013), English rugby league footballer of the 1940s, 1950s and 1960s (brother of Danny Naughton)
- Bill Naughton (1910–1992), Irish-born British playwright
- Bobby Naughton (born 1944) American jazz vibraphonist
- Cathal Naughton (born 1987), Cork hurler
- Carmel Naughton (fl. 1980's - present), Irish philanthropist
- Charlie Naughton (1886–1976), Scottish comedian, member of The Crazy Gang see also Naughton and Gold
- Christina and Michelle Naughton, American piano duo
- Curtis Naughton (born 1995), English rugby league footballer of the 2010s
- Danny Naughton, English rugby league footballer of the 1940s and 1950s (brother of Albert Naughton)
- David Naughton (born 1951), American actor and singer
- Denis Naughten (born 1973), Irish politician
- Don Naughton (1879–1960), New Zealand cricketer
- Eileen S. Naughton (born 1945), American politician
- Eoghan Ó Neachtain (1867–1957), Irish writer, fl. 1901–1932.
- James Naughton (born 1945), American actor
- Joe Steve O Neachtain (1942–2020), Irish actor and playwright.
- Joel Naughton (born 1986), is an Australian catcher for the Philadelphia Phillies Baseball organization.
- John Naughton (born 1946), Irish academic and journalist
- Keith Naughton, Republican political consultant
- Kyle Naughton (born 1988), English footballer currently playing for Swansea City
- Liam Naughten (1944–1996), Irish Fine Gael politician
- Martin Naughton, several people
  - Martin Naughton (businessman) (born 1940) Irish entrepreneur
  - Martin Naughton (hurler) (born 1964) Irish hurler
- Naturi Naughton (born 1984), American singer and actress
- Packy Naughton (born 1996), American baseball player
- Patrick Naughton (born 1965), American software developer who co-created the Java programming language
- Rear Admiral Richard J. Naughton (1946–2011), former Superintendent of the U.S. Naval Academy.
- Seán Ó Neachtain (born 1947), former Irish Fianna Fáil politician.
- Tommy Naughton, former manager of the Dunlin Senior Hurling team
- Willie Naughton (1870–1906), Scottish footballer
- Willie Naughton (footballer, born 1962), Scottish footballer

== Similar surnames ==
- MacNaughton is of Scottish origin and they are descended from the eighth century Pictish King Nechtan.
- See Norton (disambiguation)
- The surnames Nocton, Neactain, Nechtan, Naughten and Quinn come from the same name as Naughton

== Historical forms of the name ==
The surname had undergone a change over the years. Naghtens or O'Naghtens (1870).
