= Russell Hobbs =

British manufacturer of household appliances

- Industry: Manufacturing
- Founded: 1952; 74 years ago
- Headquarters: Regent Mill, Fir Street, Failsworth, Oldham, UK
- Products: Home appliances, health and beauty products
- Owner: Spectrum Brands
- Website: www.russellhobbs.com

Russell Hobbs is a British manufacturer of household appliances. Founded in 1952 by William Russell and Peter Hobbs, they launched the first automatic kettle in 1955, and became the primary kettle maker in the United Kingdom marketplace in the years that followed. Subjected to many corporate acquisitions through its history, its head office is currently sited in Failsworth, England, although the company has moved its manufacturing operations to China.

== History ==
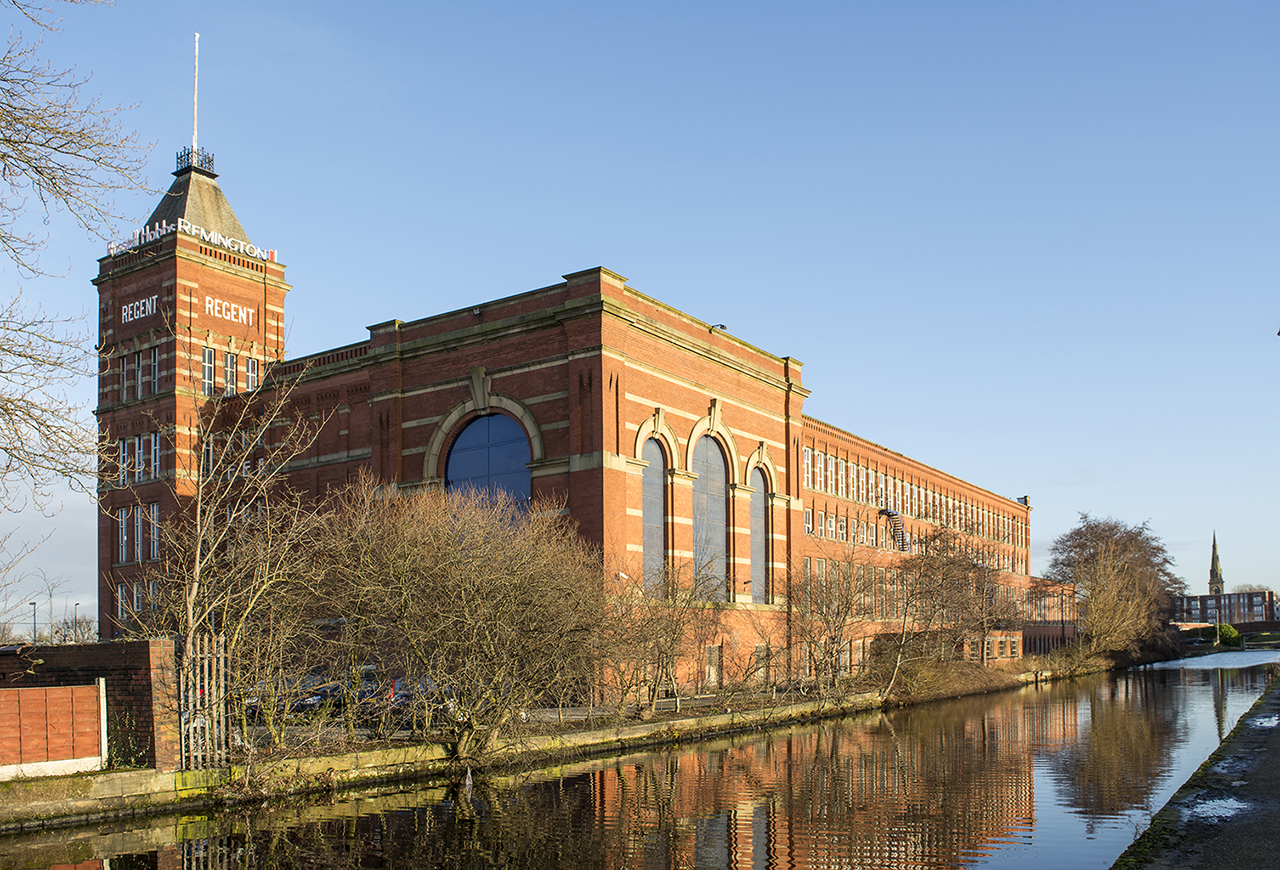
Regent Mill at Fir Street in Failsworth, next to the Rochdale Canal

=== Founding ===
After serving with the British Army's REME in World War II, William Russell (22 July 1920 – 16 February 2006), from High Wycombe, joined home appliance manufacturer Morphy Richards and helped to design a pop-up toaster, an electric iron and a hairdryer, when working as Chief Development Engineer. Peter Hobbs (3 May 1916 – 11 April 2008), from Tunbridge Wells, was a major during the war in the Royal Engineers, and he also worked for Morphy Richards, as manager of the South African division of the company. He had returned to the UK in 1952, after a disagreement with Charles Richards over sales policy, and worked for another company, where he was trying to design a coffee percolator, with reference to a German patent.

Later in 1952, Bill Russell had a disagreement with Donal Morphy and joined Hobbs to form Russell Hobbs Ltd at 1 Bensham Lane in Broad Green, Croydon, Surrey, near the A213/A235 junction south of Mayday Hospital, with Russell on design and engineering and Hobbs on marketing and sales.

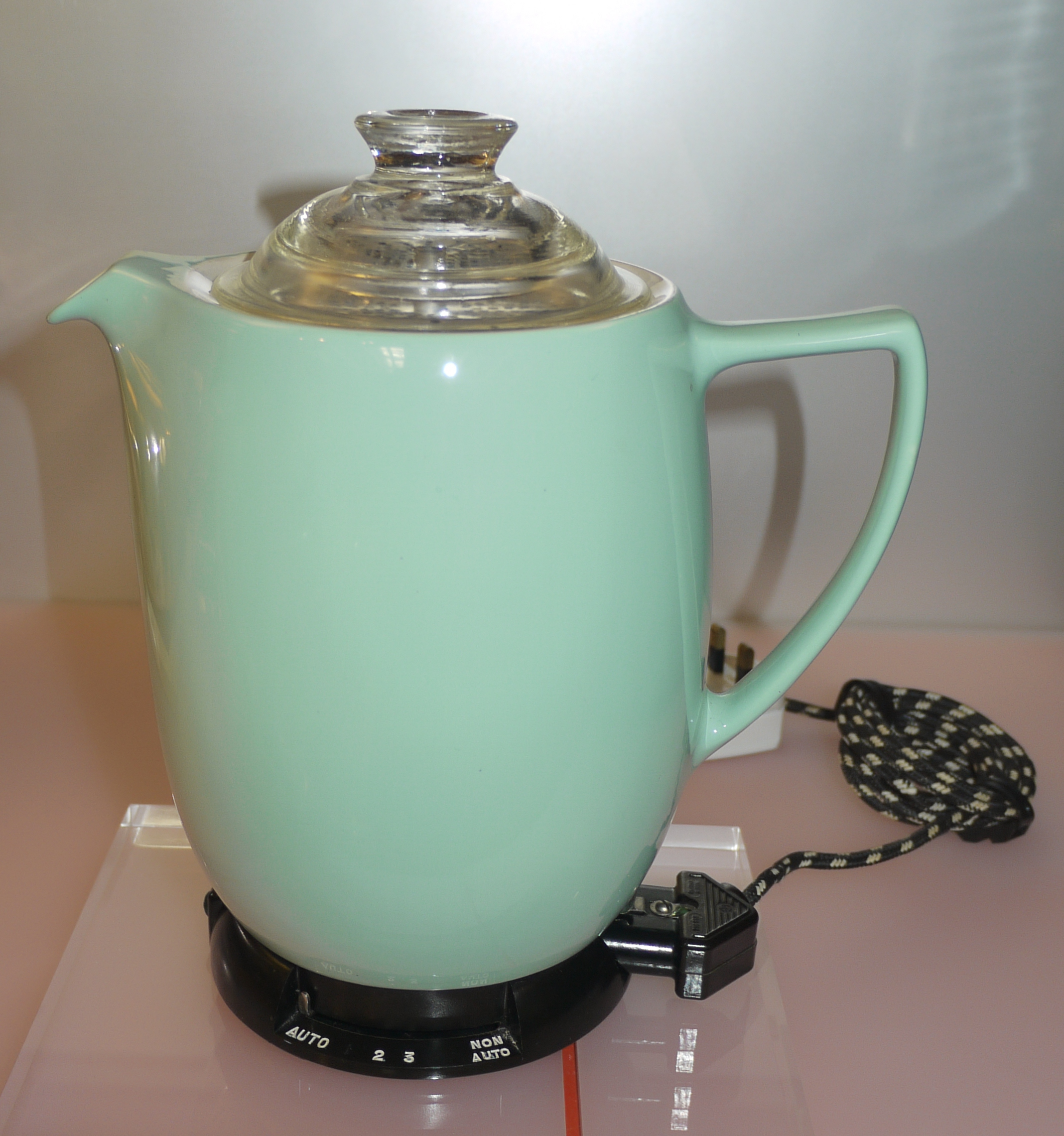
A CP1 coffee percolator

In 1952, they designed the world's first automatic coffee percolator, the CP1, and in 1955 they introduced the K1, the first electric kettle that switched itself off as soon as the water boiled.

=== Tube Investments ===
In 1962, they needed to expand the company to increase production and needed more capital. They were forced to sell the company to Tube Investments (TI), a conglomerate of electrical appliance brands who also owned Creda (a competitor of Hotpoint – GEC at the time owned both Hotpoint and Morphy Richards).

Production was moved to Wombourne in Staffordshire, where it was shared with Creda and to Blythe Bridge in Stoke-on-Trent, where it was based in a former aircraft factory later owned by Indesit. The Blythe Bridge site on was shared with Simplex Electric Co Ltd (owner of Creda), and Simplex-GE, (a joint venture of TI with GE of America) that made electrical switching equipment. Simplex also made tungsten-iodine floodlighting (halogen lamp).

Russell became technical director of Creda, then managed Turnright. As part of the Electrical Division of TI, it was headquartered at Simplex House in Alperton, Middlesex. The Domestic Appliance division of TI was later based at Radiation House in Neasden.

In the mid-1970s Dimplex diversified into coffee percolators and electric kettles due to former Russell Hobbs engineers joining the company.

The heyday of the TI Group was in 1978, but by the early 1980s, the TI Group was facing difficulties, with its workforce halving. TI Group formally referred to Russell Hobbs as TI Russell Hobbs.

=== Polly Peck ===
TI sold off their consumer brands, with the company going to Polly Peck International, on 11 December 1986 for £12 million, along with Tower Housewares (a utensil manufacturer based at Wombourne near Wolverhampton). The subsidiary was known as Russell Hobbs Tower. Creda would be sold to GEC in June 1987. In the late 1980s Russell Hobbs sponsored sports events.

=== Pifco and Salton ===
Following the collapse of Polly Peck, Russell Hobbs Tower was bought by Manchester-based Pifco Holdings on 5 April 1991. By the end of the decade, Russell Hobbs had become the most important of Pifco's various brands and product lines. Salton, a US manufacturer of kitchen appliances, bought Pifco in 2001 and continued to focus on developing Russell Hobbs as one of the company's key brands.

=== Russell Hobbs Inc. ===
In December 2007, two companies in the small household appliance business, Salton, Inc. and Applica Incorporated, merged. Applica became a wholly owned subsidiary of Salton. In December 2009, the combined company (formerly known as Salton, Inc.) changed its name to Russell Hobbs, Inc. Russell died on 16 February 2006 aged 85. Hobbs died on 11 April 2008 aged 91.

=== Spectrum Brands Inc. ===
In 2010, Spectrum Brands Inc. acquired Russell Hobbs, Inc. and in 2011, the Russell Hobbs business in the UK was reorganised to become Spectrum Brands (UK) Ltd. Spectrum Brands in the UK now design and manufacture consumer products in addition to Russell Hobbs, including the brands Remington, IAMS, Eukanuba, Tetra, FURminator, Rayovac and VARTA.

== Product development ==
Russell was in charge of product development, and Hobbs was the sales director. Russell's de facto ultimate safety test for any new product was to pour half a pint of boiling gravy on it. In the late 1960s it was chiefly manufacturing automatic electric coffee pots, vapour-controlled electric kettles, and tea makers.

The design of new jug kettles was shown in a 1983 episode of the BBC 'Science Topics', with Michael Morecroft, with new 1980s kettles being switched off by a thermistor. Michael Morecroft joined as Engineering Director in 1978. There were 19 in the Engineering team. The new plastic jug kettles began around 1983, and won awards from the American Society of Production Engineers.

== Innovations ==
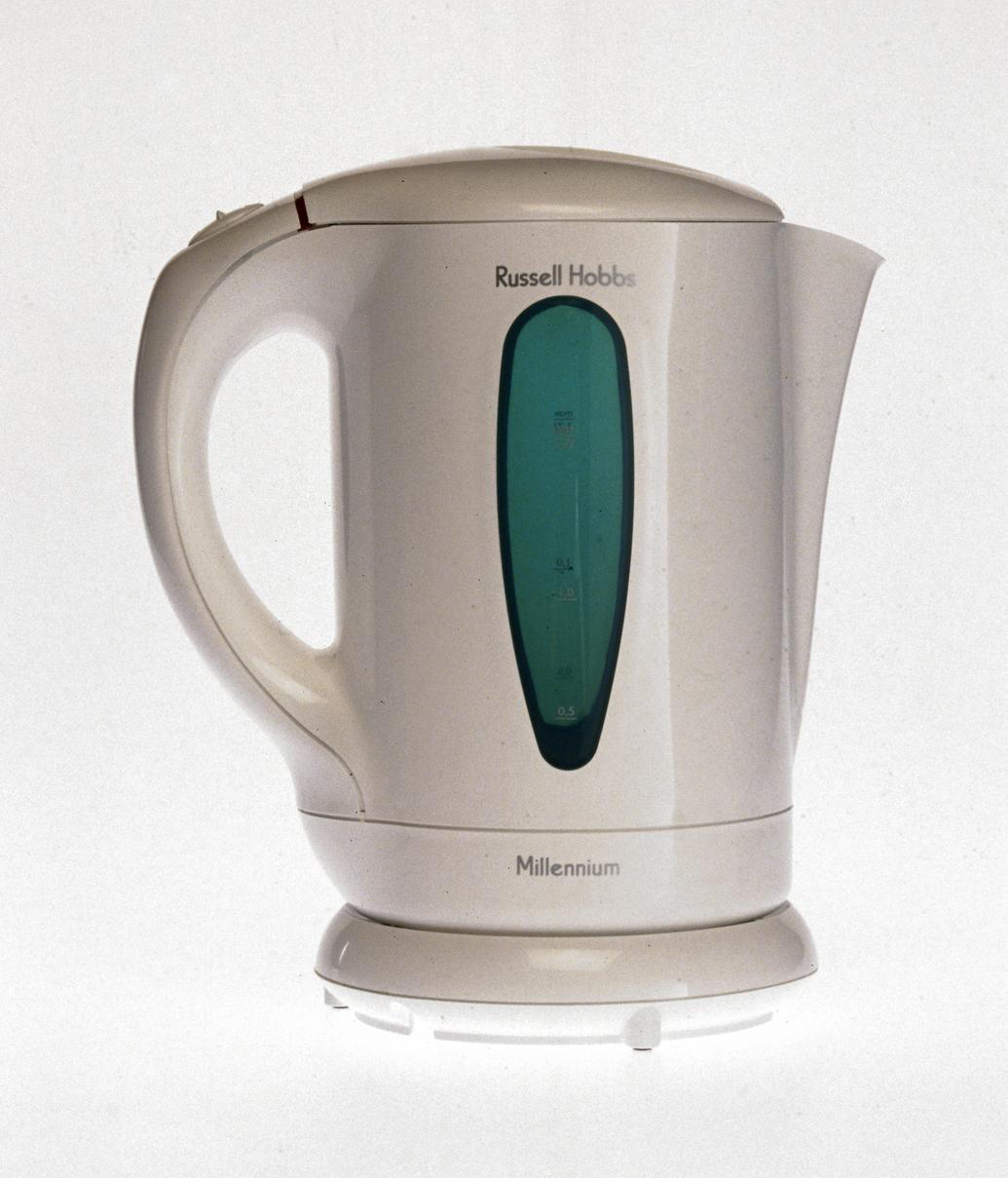
Millennium kettle with OPTEC disc element

- In 1952, the company introduced the world’s first electric coffee percolator.
- The automatic electric kettle K1 (a world first), designed in October 1955, used a bi-metallic strip at the rear of the kettle: steam was forced through an aperture in the lid of the strip, which this actuated a switch, turning the kettle off.
- In 1960, the K2 kettle was introduced, which was manufactured for the next thirty years, and was possibly the company's best-known product.
- In 1972, Russell & Hobbs produced the world's first all-plastic kettle, called "The Futura", which was spout-filled and equipped with an external liquid level indicator. The model was designed by Julius Thalmann. It still held to the traditional shape of a kettle, with radical new styling facilitated by the malleability of its heat-resistant plastic construction. The Futura was retailed at the expensive end of the market (£9.65p in 1972 prices) and received good reviews in the press on its commercial release. However, it did not sell well as the 1970s progressed. Despite its eye-catching innovative elements, the plastic used (Noryl) was found to heat-discolour after regular use. The model was slow to boil and customers were put off by the spout-filling design which prevented a view inside the kettle to confirm its clean condition. In 1978, the company adjusted the design in an attempt to overcome its adverse market reputation, changing the plastic used to Kematal, which had greater heat-resistant properties, but sales did not greatly improve and the model was discontinued in 1979 with the advent of the tall "Jug kettle" design from Redring with its Autoboil model.
- In 1996, the company introduced the Millennium 1.7 L kettle that used a special 3000 W/240 V printed thick film OPTEC flat disc element to boil water in about half the time, with a limescale filter.
- The company designed the world's first fully programmable kettle, the 'Millennium 2' (M2).

== Product range ==
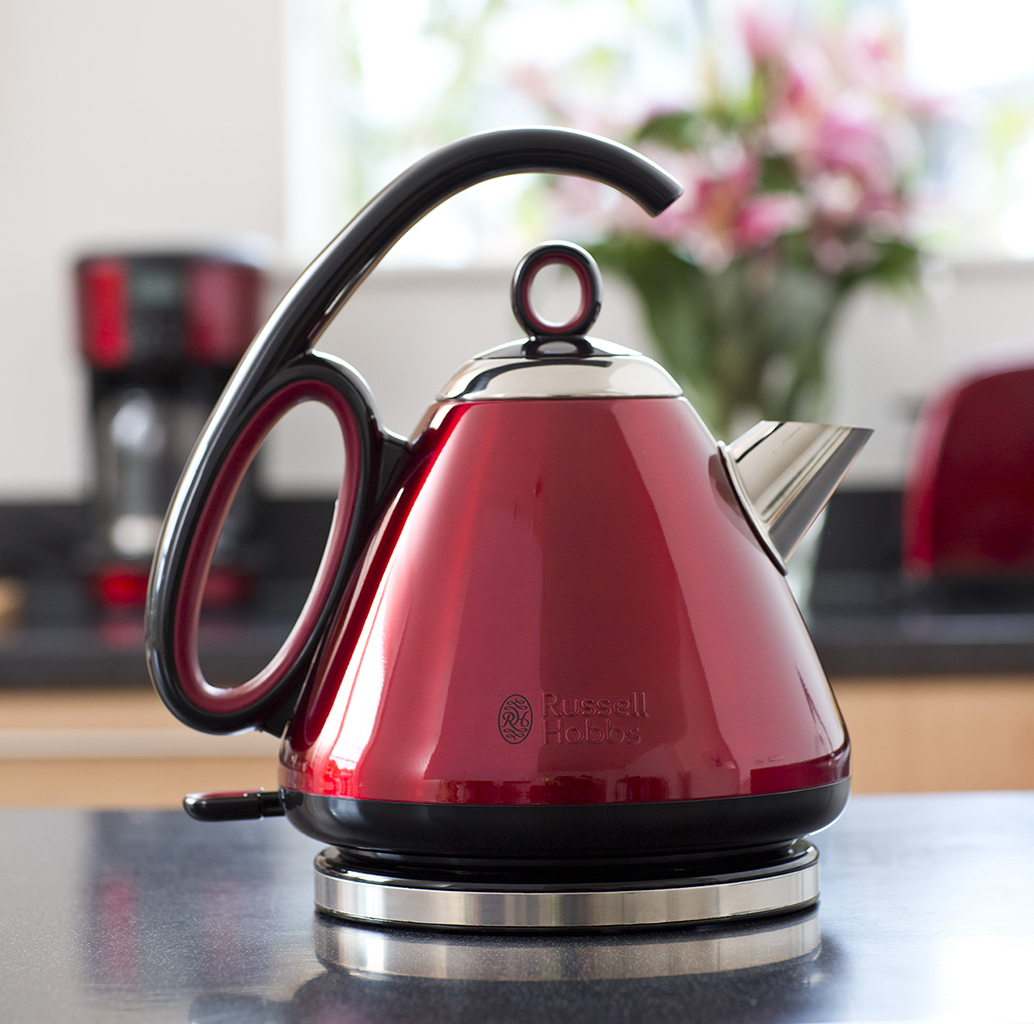
Russell Hobbs Legacy kettle

The company also distributes:

- Bread makers
- Electric hobs
- Electric jar openers
- Electric kettles
- Electric shavers (after merging with Remington)
- Coffeemaker
- Food processors
- Irons
- Juicers
- Microwave ovens
- Smoothie makers
- Toasters
  - Sandwich toasters
- Vacuum cleaners
- Rice cookers
- Heaters
