= Donal Morphy =

British electrical engineer

Donal William Morphy (12 December 1900 – 25 May 1975) was a British electrical engineer from Kent who formed Morphy Richards in July 1936 with engineer Charles Richards.

== Family ==
His father worked for a shipping company. His parents were Arthur Morphy (7 October 1876 - March 1956) and Gwendolyn Pilcher (26 April 1877 - 11 March 1966). Arthur's sister, Elenora Ruth Morphy (25 April 1879 - 4 August 1973) married Gwendolyn's brother Victor George Pilcher (28 April 1870 - 12 September 1928), on 29 December 1898.

His parents married at the English Church, in Athens in Greece, on March 19 1900.

== Early life ==
He was born in Patras in Greece.

He attended the independent Bedford School. From 1917 to 1920 he studied electrical engineering at the City and Guilds College (now part of Imperial College London).

At university, he rowed competitively. From 1920 his father, Arthur, financially donated a rowing cup to the university, to be competed on the River Thames, the Morphy Cup. The annual college sports day was called Morphy Day.

== Career ==
=== Morphy Richards ===
He formed Morphy Richards with Charles Richards on 8 July 1936. Charles Richards died aged 64 on Sunday 15 November 1964.

== Personal life ==
In the 1920s he lived in East Sheen. He married Margaret Clare Sherring (born 12 May 1900) on 3 August 1923 at Christ Church, East Sheen, in Surrey, by Rev E.H. Tupper. His wife was the eldest daughter of Charles Atmore Sherring, of Sheen Mount, in East Sheen. From the 1950s he lived at Peasons Lodge on Holbrook Lane in Chislehurst, and by the 1960s he lived at 'Upper Mead' in Byworth in West Sussex.

His wife's mother, Florence, died, suddenly, on July 27 1939, aged 71; she originated from Banham, Norfolk, where she is buried. His wife's father died on October 9 1940, aged 72; he attended Westminster School and Trinity College, Cambridge.

His wife's sister Enid Joyce Sherring married the Hertfordshire tennis player Teddy Higgs on December 10 1931 at Christ Church, East Sheen. His wife's mother's sister, Beatrice Clara Rixon, married Sir Henry Eggar on September 5 1923, at Christ Church, East Sheen; Henry Eggar was the father of Sir Arthur Eggar.

They had a daughter on 22 September 1928. Their daughter Helen Margaret attended Stratford House School in Bickley, and later at Godolphin School. Helen, aged 24, married Patrick Dyas (April 30 1917 - January 16 2002), aged 35, at St Nicholas, Chislehurst, on Saturday June 26 1953. Patrick was the son of Samuel Robert Dyas (1877-1942); Helen and Patrick had met at the Royal Corinthian Yacht Club on the Essex coast; Patrick Dyas was awarded the OBE in the 1984 Birthday Honours, and was the chairman of the Robert Dyas retail chain. Patrick and Helen had four daughters, and moved to Broadbridge Heath in Sussex. Aged 49, Helen was elected to West Sussex County Council, as a Conservative councillor for Itchingfield, later for Hurst. Helen died in Surrey in December 1994.

Granddaughter Nicola married Major Robert Gillespie Parsons, son of Brigadier Frederick Gillespie Austin Parsons, who was the grandson of Dorina Neave, of Chittlehamholt, Devon, in 1983, divorcing in 1986. Granddaughter Mary-Anne married Toby Stevenson, son of Patrick Stevenson, of Tavistock, Devon. Granddaughter Dinah married Toby Priestley, son of Martin Priestley.

In the late 1950s and early 1960s he took part in many yachting competitions, across the North Sea. He died in West Sussex aged 74 in May 1975. His wife died on 20 May 1982.

== See also ==
- Peter Hobbs (engineer), former Morphy Richards employee, who formed Russell Hobbs in 1952
