= Electric fire =

Electric Fire is the name of the fourth solo album by Roger Taylor, from the band Queen.

Electric fire can also refer to:

- Electric fireplace, an electric heater that mimics a fireplace burning coal, wood, or natural gas
- Electric fire, in British English, short for electric fireplace

== See also ==
- Electrical fire, a fire involving the hazard of potentially energized electrical equipment
