= Michael Barnes (arts administrator) =

Director of the Belfast Festival at Queens and the Grand Opera House, Belfast

Michael Barnes (31 October 1932 – 14 May 2008) was an arts administrator and promoter, primarily in Northern Ireland, where he was director of the Belfast Festival at Queen's (originally the Queen's University Festival) and the Grand Opera House, Belfast.

Born in Peckham, South London, he became interested in theatre while attending Alleyn's School on a scholarship. Having also received a scholarship to Wadham College, Oxford, he took a first in history and, after graduating, became a lecturer in modern history at the University of Edinburgh. Whilst in Edinburgh, he took part in shows during the Edinburgh Festival Fringe, but found that "learning huge dollops of script wasn’t all that appealing".

In 1961, he became a lecturer in history at Queen's University Belfast, but continued to have an interest in the arts. The arts festival which would later become the Queen's University Festival was founded by a student, Michael Emmerson, in 1962, and Barnes quickly became involved. When Emmerson started a Belfast branch of the National Film Theatre as the Queen's Film Theatre in 1968, Barnes was the chairman of the film sub-committee.

== Belfast Festival ==
In 1973, Barnes was a senior lecturer in modern history at Queen's, when the role of Director of the Queen's University Festival became vacant. The Festival was in financial and creative difficulties and its future was uncertain. Queen's agreed to allow him to work on the Festival while remaining in his academic post, and Barnes became the Director, a post he would hold until 1994. Under Barnes' leadership, the Festival became the second largest in the British Isles after the Edinburgh Festival, and was able to attract internationally known performers, even during The Troubles, when many artists and audiences were reluctant to visit Northern Ireland. Performers included the Royal Shakespeare Company, the Moscow State Ballet, Yehudi Menuhin and local talents like Seamus Heaney and James Galway. Barnes also promoted newer artists like Nikolai Demidenko, Trestle Theatre, Philip Hammond, Rowan Atkinson and Billy Connolly.

In the 1970s, Belfast's Grand Opera House was going to be sold and demolished. It was instead purchased by the Arts Council of Northern Ireland, who successfully applied to make it the first listed building in Northern Ireland. Barnes supervised an extensive renovation, and when the Opera House re-opened in 1980, he was the artistic director. He left his academic post in 1976, to concentrate full-time on his roles in the arts; his dual role helped the Opera House become a significant venue for the Festival. He continued in this position until 1994, and undertook two further refurbishments in 1991 and 1993, when the building, which was situated adjacent to the Europa Hotel - the "most bombed hotel in Europe" - was damaged by explosions.

After his retirement in 1994, his health began to suffer, and he lived in a nursing home in Belfast until his death in 2008.

In 1981, Barnes had convinced Michael Palin to perform his first solo show at the Belfast Festival; he returned every other year after. Belfast was the only place where Palin performed his one-man shows, saying that nowhere could be "better than the Belfast Festival". The two men became friends, and after Barnes' death, Palin set up a drama scholarship programme at Queen's University in his memory.
