= De La Salle College Dundalk =

School in County Louth, Ireland

Coordinates: 54.0167°N 6.4278°W

De La Salle College, Dundalk
- Coláiste De La Salle, Dún Dealgan
- Castleblayney Road, Dundalk, County Louth, Ireland

Information
- Motto: Recta Sapere ('Knowing what is right')
- Established: 1899
- Principal: Nicola Connolly
- Teaching staff: 50 approx.
- Enrollment: 740 approx.
- Website: De La Salle College, Dundalk

De La Salle College, Dundalk is a secondary school for boys in Dundalk, County Louth, Ireland. It offers a co-educational repeat Leaving Certificate year, and recently built an extension to its school buildings.

== History ==
The De La Salle school was founded in Dundalk in 1899. It began in Castletown in the parish of St. Patrick. In 1979 the post-primary school moved to its present location on the Castleblayney Road. Work commenced on the new extension in 1997. The current enrolment is around 750 pupils.

== School crest and motto ==
=== Crest ===
This consists of a star on a shield flanked by a green fern. On the scroll beneath are the Latin words "Signum Fidei" meaning "The Sign of Faith", referring to the star. This recalls the story of the Three Wise Men who followed the Star of Bethlehem, trusting that it would lead them to God.

=== School motto ===
The Latin "Recta Sapere" meaning "Right Judgement" or "Knowing what is Right" is the motto of De La Salle College, Dundalk.

== School structure ==
=== Board of Management ===
The De La Salle Brothers are the Trustees of the College. The school is under the control of the Board of Management. The Board concerns itself with all matters pertaining to school policy, education policy, finance, school premises and equipment, the selection and appointment of staff and general school matters. The Board ensures that professional standards of education and management are continued in the school. The Board also facilitates the implementation of curricular innovation. Membership of the Board of Management includes De La Salle Order nominees, Parent nominees and Teacher nominees. The Principal of the College is the Secretary.

=== Parents association ===
The Parents Association has elected representatives from each region. Members are elected every year.

The role of the Association is a supportive one - to the Principal, School Management, Staff and Students. It aims to foster good relations between the parents, teachers, students and the school authorities. It supports the school by making recommendations about current trends in education. It is sometimes involved in fund-raising to provide extra resource for the school.

=== Student council ===
A student council serves to represent the student views. They involve themselves in a whole range of activities within the school. Students are given Leadership Training at the beginning of the school year. The students attend lectures and learn the skills necessary for teamwork and leadership.

== School uniform ==
Like most schools in Ireland and the UK, the students of De La Salle College, Dundalk wear a distinct uniform making them instantly recognisable as pupils of the college. The uniform consists of:

- Grey slacks
- Grey shirt
- Polar blue jumper with college crest
- Black Blazer or Fleece with college crest
- School tie (Varying design for Junior and Leaving Cert. Students)
- Grey socks

== Notable alumni ==
- Steve Staunton, former Ireland football player and manager.
- Martin Naughton, Irish businessman, founder of Glen Dimplex.
- Brendan O'Dowda, Irish tenor.
- Paddy Keenan, Gaelic footballer for Louth
- Michael O'Connor, professional footballer, former Republic of Ireland U21 international
