= The Naughton Gallery at Queen's =

Coordinates: 54.585°N 5.934°W

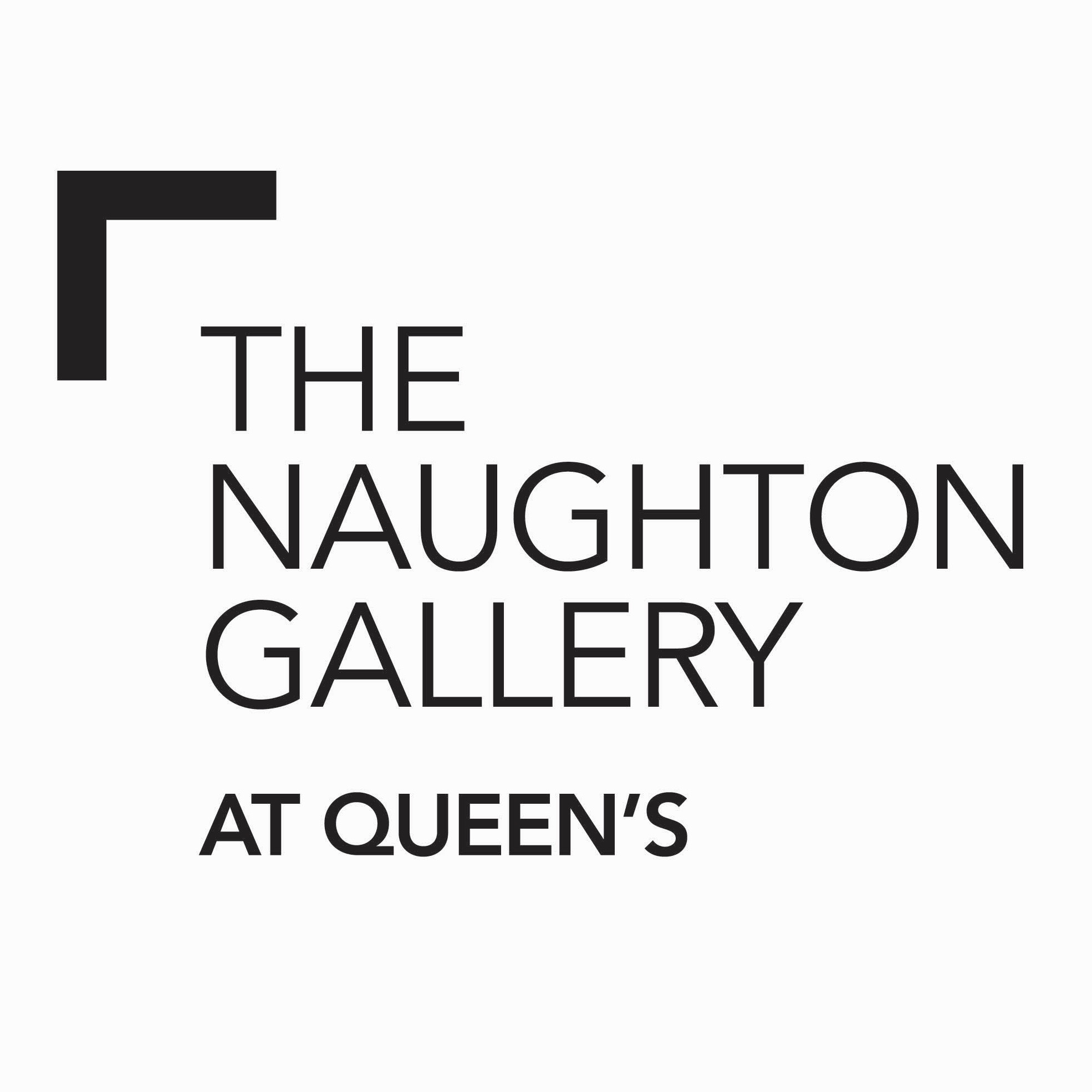
- Established: 2001
- Location: Belfast, Northern Ireland
- Type: Art gallery Art museum
- Curator: Ben Crothers
- Website: www.naughtongallery.org

The Naughton Gallery at Queen's, also known as The Naughton Gallery, is an art gallery and museum at Queen's University Belfast, Northern Ireland. Opened in 2001, the gallery is named after its benefactors, Martin and Carmel Naughton, who donated £500,000 to the university in 2002. Located on the first floor of the Queen's University's Lanyon building, the gallery displays six exhibitions per year presenting local and international contemporary artists. Among the talks and events organised in conjunction with the exhibitions, the Naughton Gallery occasionally organises screenings with the Queen's Film Theatre, which is also a cultural institution under the auspices of Queen's University.

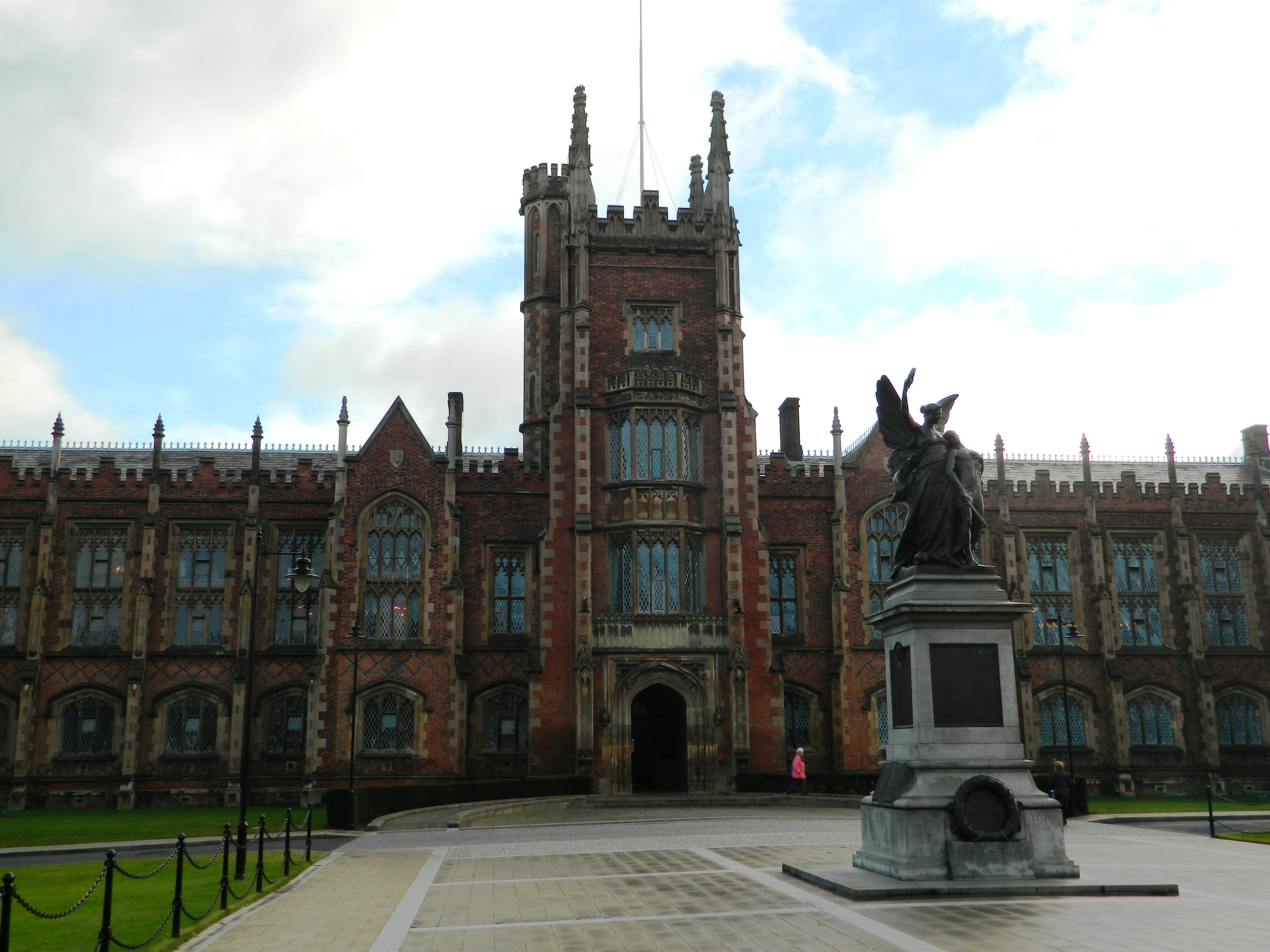
The Naughton Gallery is situated on the first floor of the Lanyon Building, above the Welcome Centre.

== See also ==
- Queen's University Belfast
- Queen's Film Theatre
- Belfast International Arts Festival
- Brian Friel Theatre
- Ulster Museum
