= Morphy Richards =

British brand of electrical appliances

- Company type: Subsidiary
- Industry: Home appliances
- Founded: 8 July 1936
- Founder: Donal Morphy
- Headquarters: Talbot Road, Swinton, South Yorkshire, United Kingdom
- Area served: Australia, United Kingdom, India, Israel
- Key people: CEO: Vicky Philemon
- Parent: Guangdong Xinbao Electrical Appliance Holdings (Donlim)
- Website: www.morphyrichards.com

Morphy Richards is a British brand of electrical appliances headquartered in Swinton, in South Yorkshire, England. Its products were formerly made at its historic home of Mexborough, and in other facilities across the United Kingdom. However, since the 1990s, all of its manufacturing has been carried out in the Far East.

== Product range ==
Morphy Richards specialises in toasters, hair dryers, bread makers, kettles and sandwich toasters and other household appliances. In its early stage it also made refrigerators and washer-dryers, but they were later made by Hotpoint. Morphy Richards is owned by the Irish Glen Dimplex electronics group. They also make Digital Radio Mondiale-compatible digital radios, and Morphy Richards in India still make a dry iron, one of very few companies to do so.

== History ==
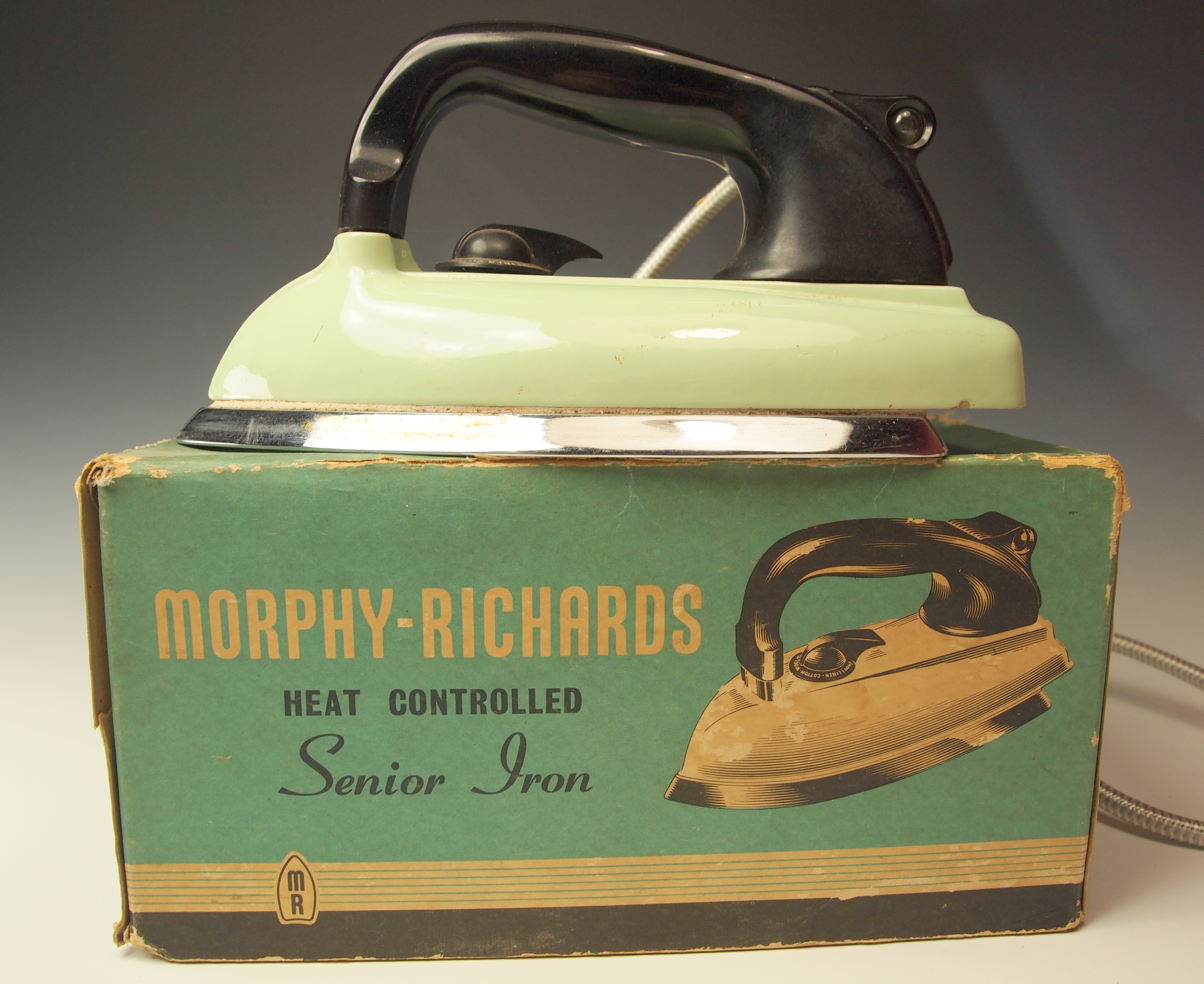
A 1950s Morphy-Richards iron with original box

Donal Morphy of Chislehurst, and Charles Richards of Farnborough, Kent, met whilst working at Sydney S Bird and Sons and formed Morphy-Richards Ltd on 8 July 1936 at an oast house in St Mary Cray in Kent. Morphy and Richards were joint managing directors, and had raised £1,000 starting capital. The company began making electric fires and, from March 1938, electric irons. During World War II, its factories made components for the aircraft industry.

A. Reyrolle & Company took 30% of the company in June 1944 and its general manager was on the board of directors. Exports accounted for around 15% of turnover, helped by subsidiary companies in Australia and South Africa. It later opened a Canadian subsidiary. The company was producing around 2,000 irons per day.

On 1 May 1947, it became a public company and merged with Astral Equipment Ltd, a company in Dundee, Scotland that made spin dryers and refrigerators. Astral became a wholly owned subsidiary. George Wansbrough was the company chairman from 1944 to 1954.

In 1949, Morphy Richards produced its first automatic toaster which used a bi-metallic strip. It also produced the Simon electric floor scrubber. In 1953, it produced its first hairdryer and claimed to have 90% of the market six years later. In 1954, it introduced a steam iron, which were still comparatively revolutionary 20 years later.

At the same time, it introduced electrical convector heaters and panel heaters (ceramic heaters). By 1957, it was the United Kingdom's leading provider of electric blankets, had produced its 10 millionth electric iron, and was producing 60% of the toasters made in the United Kingdom.

In June 1957, the company bought Yelsen Ltd, a manufacturer of electric blankets at Ruxley in Kent, for £112,000, and it became a subsidiary. Also in June, new factories opened at the main site and in Dundee. 40% of products were exported and overseas subsidiaries had been established. Donal Morphy did not like the huge expansion of the company, but Richards thought it was too slow. Sir Patrick Bishop became chairman in 1957.

=== EMI ===
Morphy sold his share of the company to EMI (Electric and Musical Industries) in August 1960, and it then tried to take over the company, as did Philips Electrical Industries. Morphy supported the EMI offer, but Richards did not. However, EMI took over the company in September 1960. In the late 1950s, the company had developed the Silavent ventilation system, manufactured for them by Robert McArd & Co.

In December 1960, the chairman, Sir Patrick Bishop, resigned, and Richards left the board. Morphy also left as managing director, but stayed on the board. Graham Hurst became managing director. By March 1961, Richards had joined GEC as joint managing director of its electrical appliance division. On 12 May 1961, a new £500,000 factory at Dundee built by Holland, Hannen & Cubitts was opened by the then Minister of Power, Richard Wood, Baron Holderness.

The Dundee site was managed by Willis Roxburgh until July 1966, and produced around a quarter of all fridges in the United Kingdom. By 1962, it was exporting to over 120 countries. In August 1962, the company appointed Faber Birren to give advice on colours of products. On 7 December 1962, Richards joined the board of directors of GEC.

In October 1963, it took over the record player division of EMI. On 15 November 1964, Charles Richards died aged 64 at his house in Buckinghamshire. In February 1965, there were discussions with English Electric to merge their large appliance divisions. In April 1965, Norman Tomlinson became managing director.

=== GEC ===
On 26 May 1966, EMI and AEI, owners of Hotpoint, decided to merge their domestic appliance divisions to form British Domestic Appliances (BDA) from 1 July 1966. Morphy Richards was employing about 4,000 people. The headquarters of BDA was at Peterborough, the site of the main Hotpoint factory.

In September 1967, GEC announced it wanted to take over AEI and, on 24 May 1968, GEC agreed to merge its domestic appliance division with BDA. EMI would own a third, and GEC two thirds. The managing director of BDA from September 1966, Laurence Peterken, was the new managing director, but he left two weeks later. The domestic appliance manufacture was moved to the Swinton Works at Mexborough and, in 1970, the original factory in St Mary Cray, which employed around 1,200 people, was closed.

The nearby Ruxley factory manufactured kettles and coffee percolators. In January 1970, it was decided to remove the Morphy Richards brand from refrigerators. It was argued that GEC had little interest in Morphy Richards. In the 1970s, BDA was the United Kingdom's largest manufacturer of domestic appliances. BDA changed its name to Hotpoint in 1975, with small domestic appliances marketed under the Morphy Richards brand. On 25 May 1975, Donal Morphy died, aged 74.

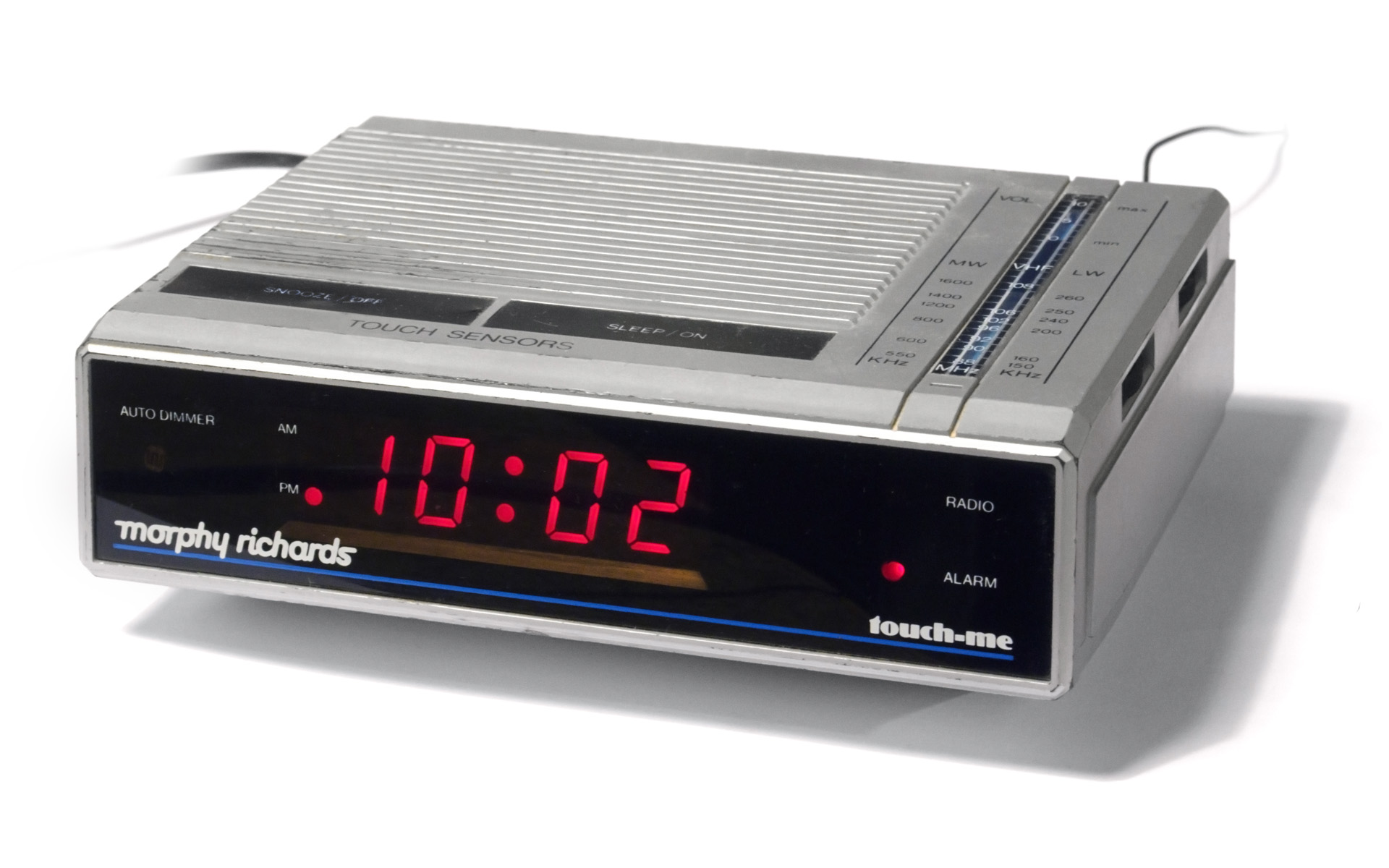
Morphy Richards "Touch-Me" clock radio circa 1984. This model was manufactured in Hong Kong.

In April 1982, the company sold Morphy Richards for £5 million to a holding company owned by The Throgmorton Trust, Capital for Industry.

=== Glen Dimplex ===
On 10 May 1985, Morphy Richards was acquired by Glen Dimplex of Ireland. From the end of the 1980s, the company was once again very successful with advances in electronics making their way into domestic appliances. Morphy Richards was one of the few manufacturers to sell appliances with a factory-fitted BS 1363 plug before it became a legal requirement.

In June 2000, the Morphy Richards factory at Mexborough announced the dismissal of 120 staff, citing increasingly adverse trading circumstances for its domestically made products, due to their displacement in the market by cheaper imports made in East Asia.

In 2002, Bajaj Electricals partnered with Morphy Richards to make, sell, market and distribute products under the brand name in the Indian market.

In October 2003, the Morphy Richards factory at Bangor, in County Down, was closed, with 84 employees losing their jobs, due to manufacturing being transferred from the United Kingdom to East Asia.

In 2007, Astral Equipment was merged with Morphy Richards and renamed Morphy Richards Astral, producing refrigerators.

In June 2022, it was reported that Glen Dimplex had agreed to sell Morphy Richards to the Chinese company Guangdong Xinbao Electrical Appliance Holdings (Xinbao), known for its brand Donlim.

Xinbao, which manufactured Morphy Richards products in China for Glen Dimplex, bought the brand globally, but was initially taking full control of only the Chinese and British operations. The British operations are now run by Consumer Brands Ltd as the official licensee. Glen Dimplex retained the rights to distribute the brand in Ireland, Australia and New Zealand for at least 10 years.

== See also ==
- Russell Hobbs, formed in 1952 by two former Morphy & Richards employees.
