= Peter Hobbs (engineer) =

English engineer and businessman (1916–2008)

- Peter Hobbs and Bill Russell (with moustache and pipe)
- Born: Peter Wallace Hobbs; 3 May 1916; Langton Green, Kent, England, UK
- Died: 11 April 2008 (aged 91)
- Education: The Skinners' School
- Spouse: Daphne Drummond
- Children: 1 son
- Engineering career
- Employer(s): Royal Engineers, Morphy Richards, Russell Hobbs
- Significant design: K2 kettle (1960)
- Significant advance: Automatic kettle - the K1 (1955); Coffee percolator - the CP1 (1952)

Peter Wallace Hobbs (3 May 1916 - 11 April 2008) was an English engineer and businessman who, with William Russell, founded the now global electrical appliance company Russell Hobbs, made famous for their design and introduction of the iconic electric kettle in the late 1950s.

== Early life ==
Peter Hobbs was born in Langton, Tunbridge Wells and attended The Skinners' School. As a young man he enjoyed amateur drama, appearing in school productions, and Christopher Fry's Tunbridge Wells Repertory Players. After leaving school he joined his father working for the Weald Electricity Supply Company.

== Military service ==
A year after the outbreak of the Second World War he joined the Royal Engineers and trained in Bangalore, and was commissioned as an officer in the Queen Victoria's Own Madras Sappers and Miners. In the Middle East he joined Paiforce (Persia and Iraq Force) where he was an adjutant to the commander of the Royal Engineers in the 6th Indian Division.

After attending the Staff College at Quetta in Baluchistan, British India he was appointed Brigade Major at Sialkot in the Punjab.

Returning to Britain he commanded a field company at the Royal School of Military Engineering then in Ripon in the North Riding of Yorkshire, with rank of Major.

== Career ==
=== Morphy Richards ===
Following demobilisation Peter became the Managing Director of Morphy Richards division in South Africa. However, due to poor trading conditions he was forced to return to Britain.

He took a job as managing director of a different company, where he oversaw what he believed to be a breakthrough innovation, a new kind of electric coffee percolator. When the board of the company decided against putting this new design into production, Peter and his co-innovator, Bill Russell, decided to go into business on their own.

=== Russell Hobbs ===
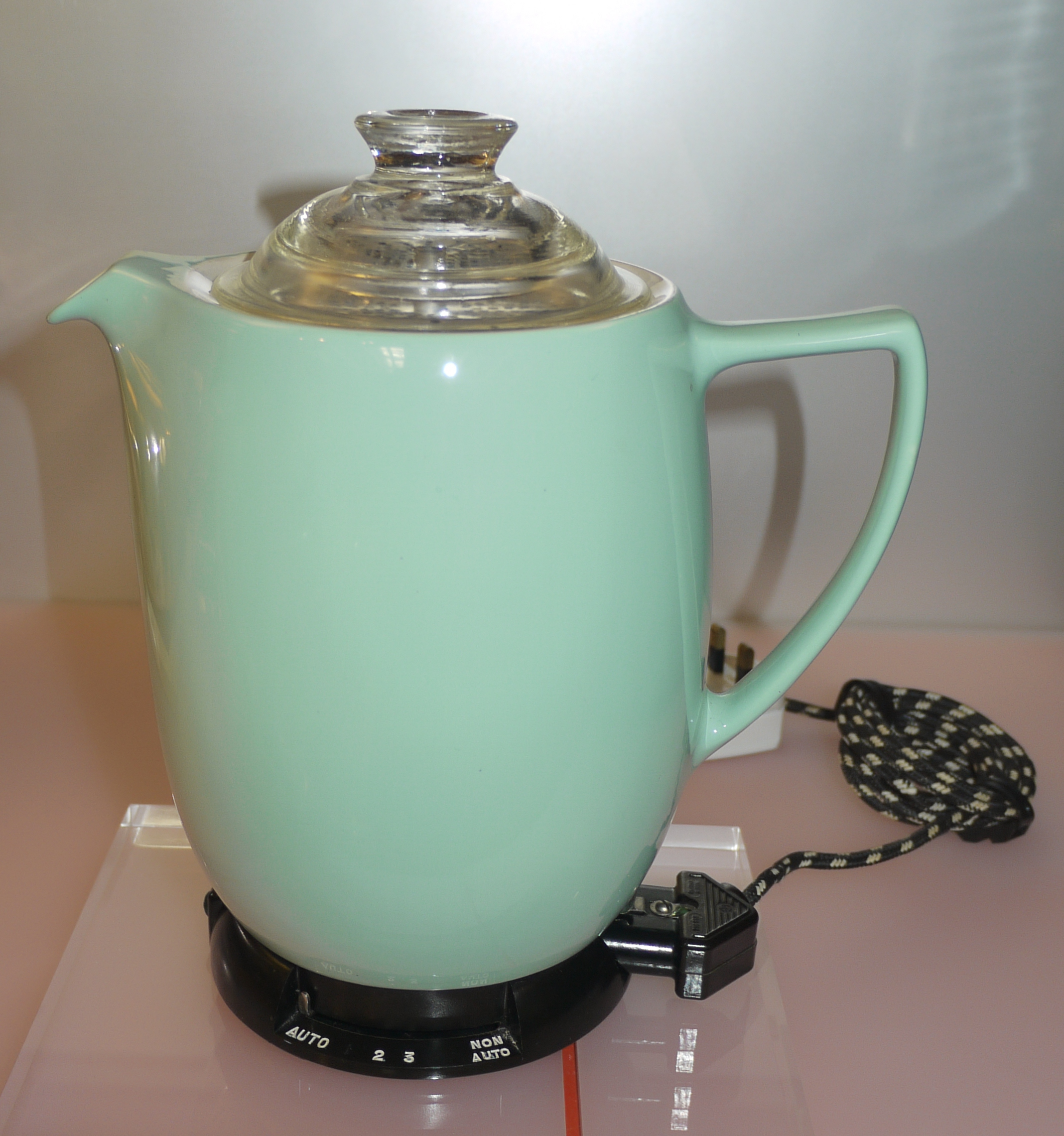
Russell Hobbs Coffee Percolator CP1

Russell Hobbs Kettle K2

Peter Hobbs and Bill Russell opened their new business in Croydon in October 1952, and later the same year launched the world's first electric coffee percolator, dubbed the CP1. This invention was soon followed by their launch of the K1 electric kettle in 1955. It was the first electric kettle with an automatic shutoff. The K1 was soon superseded by the K2, which had a more attractive appearance. Both versions were expensive, but were built to last. The first K2 Kettles sold for £7, at a time when the average weekly wage was £14, but they became popular as wedding gifts. Russell Hobbs has reports of K2s still operational after 30 years, and, although they are now extremely rare, collectors will pay up to £200 for a K2 in mint condition.

The CP1 coffee percolator and K1 kettle are displayed in the Science Museum in South Kensington.

In 1963 the company was bought by Tube Investments, and by the mid-1970s Russell Hobbs was the world leader in sales of automatic kettles. The Russell Hobbs Company is now owned by Spectrum Brands, with its products available in over 40 countries.

After selling the business Peter Hobbs was director of Valor Stoves, and later ran a restaurant called Manley's, in Storrington, West Sussex.

== Personal life ==
He married Daphne Drummond in 1966, his wife for 30 years until her death in 1996. They had a son.

Throughout his life Hobbs enjoyed racing yachts with Don Morphy of Morphy Richards and was a long-standing member of the Royal Ocean Racing Club.

Hobbs and his family moved to Xlendi, Gozo, Malta after retirement. In 1983 the family moved to Corrèze in Southern France.
