= Bulpitt & Sons =

Former English electrical goods manufacturer

Bulpitt & Sons Ltd
- Industry: Manufacturing
- Founded: 19th century
- Fate: Bought out; wound up.
- Headquarters: Birmingham, England
- Products: Domestic electrical appliances

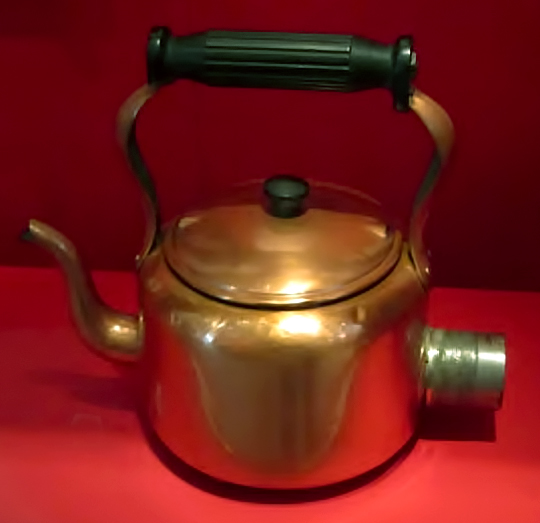
A Swan electric kettle in brass, at the Museum of Liverpool, England

Bulpitt & Sons Ltd was an electrical goods manufacturer and limited company in Birmingham, England, established as a brass founder in the late 19th century.

In the early 20th century the company registered The "Swan Brand" name.

In the 1920s, the company began manufacturing domestic electrical appliances including kettles and irons. The firm developed the first submersible electric heating element. An early example of a Swan brand copper kettle featuring the immersed heating element is in the collection of the Science Museum Group.

In the 1970s, the company became a subsidiary of BSR (Housewares) Ltd., originally Birmingham Sound Reproducers, manufacturers of turntables for playing records.

The rival French company Moulinex acquired the Swan brand in 1988 and Bulpitt & Sons (Swan Brand) Ltd was eventually dissolved on 21 May 1989, just short of a century after the company's foundation. The Swan brand was acquired by Littlewoods in 2000. In 2017, the brand was bought by Swan Products Ltd and since 2023 has been owned by Sutton Venture Group, operating under that company's RKW trading division.

The firm's kitchenware factory and offices at St George's Works on Icknield Street, Camden Street and Pope Street at the edge of Birmingham's Jewellery Quarter dated back to 1890. Some manufacturing at the site continued until 2006. Property developers began stripping the interior in 2009, in preparation for conversion to office accommodation. Subsequently, the building, renamed The Kettleworks was converted into residential apartments and commercial units, completed in 2019.

== See also ==
- Teasmade
