= Carmel Naughton =

Irish philanthropist

Carmel Naughton D.Litt., D.Phil., MRIA, HRHA
- Education: St. Louis Secondary School, Monaghan
- Occupation: Philanthropist
- Known for: Patronage of the arts, education and camogie
- Spouse: Martin Naughton
- Children: 3

Carmel Patricia Naughton is an Irish philanthropist.

Naughton attended St. Louis Secondary School, Monaghan, and is a graduate of Mary Immaculate College. She married businessman and GlenDimplex founder Martin Naughton. Naughton and her husband have three children, including Fergal Naughton, who is married to the former Undergraduate Awards board member, Rachael Naughton. She lives at Stackallan House, County Meath.

Through the Naughton Foundation, Naughton has funded STEM scholarships for Irish leaving certificate students, having been told in her childhood by a nun that girls were "stupid", and "couldn't do maths". She has sponsored the Camogie Association. With her husband Naughton has been a benefactor to the Museum of Literature Ireland and Queen's University's Naughton Gallery.

From 1996 to 2002, Naughton served as Chairman of the National Gallery of Ireland's board of governors. In 2007, she was elected as a member of the Royal Irish Academy. In the 2010s, she accepted a ministerial appointment to the board of St. James's Hospital, Dublin. She was among the inaugural trustees of the Edmund Rice Schools Trust when it took control of Irish former Christian Brothers' Schools in 2008. In 2016, Naughton and her husband Martin were named philanthropists of the year by the Community Foundation for Ireland.

In 2004 Naughton received an honorary doctorate from the University of Notre Dame. Charles, Prince of Wales awarded her a medal for services to the arts in Northern Ireland. In 2015 she was a recipient of the Royal Hibernian Academy (RHA) Gold Medal, and she is an honorary member of the RHA. In 2019, she received an honorary doctorate from Trinity College Dublin. She has been named Mary I College alumnus of the year.
