= Belfast International Arts Festival =

- Genre: Arts festival
- Frequency: Annual
- Locations: Belfast, Northern Ireland
- Years active: 60
- Inaugurated: 1962
- Website: belfastinternationalartsfestival.com

Belfast International Arts Festival, formerly known as Belfast Festival at Queen's, is an annual arts festival held in Belfast in Northern Ireland. The organiser's describe the event as "the city's longest-running international arts event".

Originally established in 1962, it was hosted by Queen's University until 2015, after which a new independent organisation (a company limited by guarantee and registered as a charity) was formed. The event covers theatre, dance, classical and roots music, visual, film and digital arts and literature accompanied by outreach and education events. It takes place every October in venues and locations across Belfast.

== History ==
The festival was founded by student Michael Emmerson in 1962. Emmerson was succeeded as director by Michael Barnes. From small beginnings the festival grew through the 1960s and 1970s, expanding to a two-week-long event. Performers during this time included Jimi Hendrix, Richard Stilgoe, Laurence Olivier, Rowan Atkinson and Billy Connolly.

In January 2007, sufficient funding was not in place to ensure that the 2007 festival would go ahead, and the university launched a 'Save Belfast Festival' campaign, encouraging people to petition Maria Eagle MP, then minister responsible for cultural activities in Northern Ireland. The campaign received support from the Belfast Telegraph and celebrities including Patrick Kielty. On 16 February 2007 the Minister announced a £150,000 one-off payment to the Belfast Festival at Queen's, although the campaign to raise more funds continued throughout the year. The university subsequently announced that the 2007 festival would go ahead, albeit on a reduced scale.

In February 2008, the Ulster Bank Group announced a sponsorship deal for the festival. In 2016, this sponsorship funding was withdrawn, leaving the Arts Council of Northern Ireland as the only sponsor of the festival.

Typically held annually, usually in October/November, the festival's events have previously been held at a number of venues across the city. These have included The MAC, Ulster Hall, the Naughton Gallery, the Queen's Film Theatre, the Brian Friel Theatre and the Whitla Hall at Queen's, as well as the Grand Opera House, the Waterfront Hall and An Chultúrlann arts centre.

== See also ==
- Belfast Film Festival
- Cathedral Quarter Arts Festival
- Féile an Phobail
