= Queen's Film Theatre =

Independent cinema at Queen's University Belfast

Coordinates: 54.585°N 5.934°W

Queen's Film Theatre (QFT)
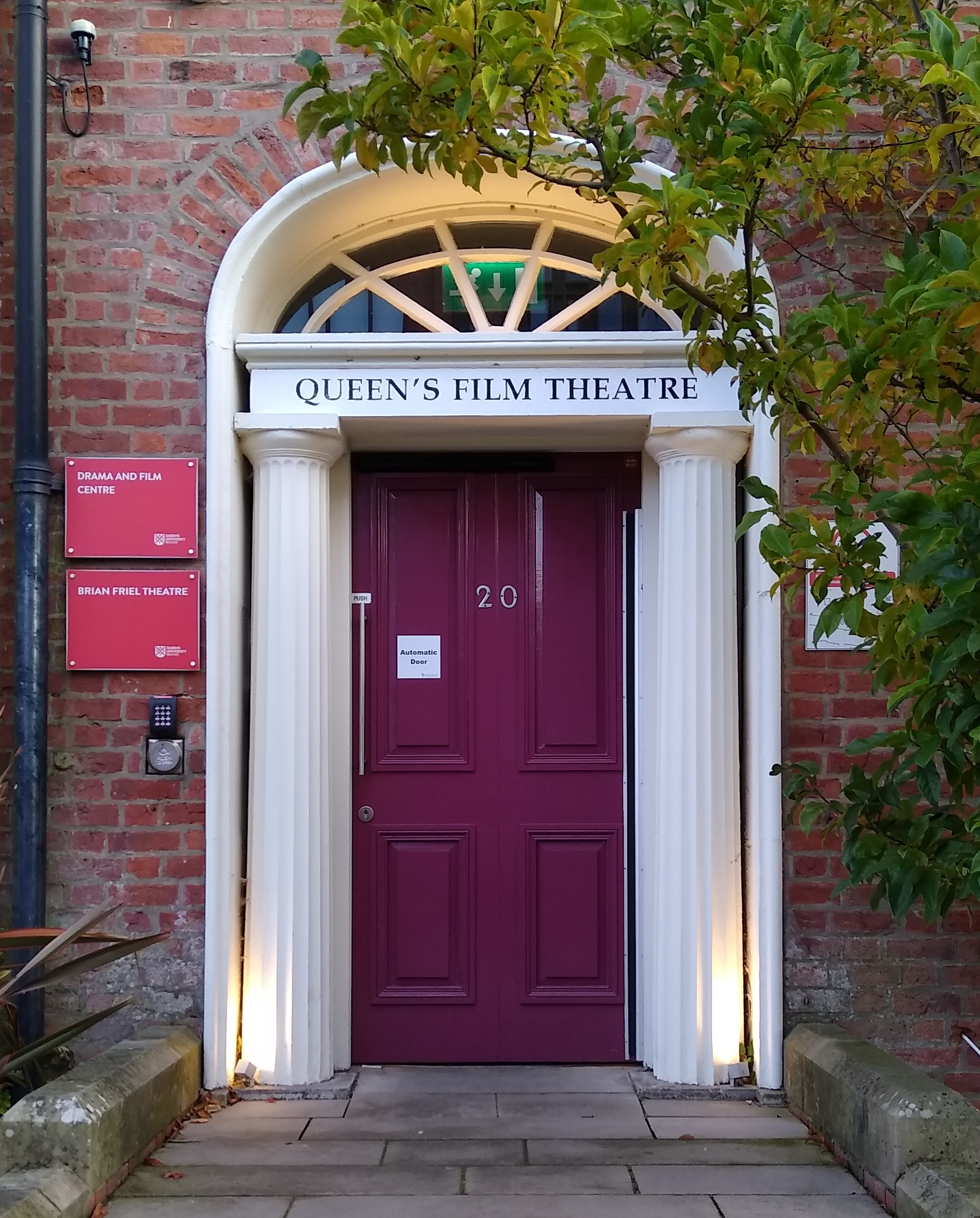
- Interactive map of Queen's Film Theatre (QFT)
- Address: 20 University Square; Belfast; Northern Ireland
- Owner: Queen's University Belfast
- Capacity: Screen 1: 204; Screen 2: 91
- Type: Art house; Indie; World Cinema

Construction
- Opened: 1968

Website
- www.queensfilmtheatre.com

The Queen's Film Theatre or QFT is an independent cinema at Queen's University Belfast, Northern Ireland founded in 1968. When first opened, the Queen’s Film Theatre focused mainly on art house, indie and world cinema, playing an important role in the cultural life of Belfast, serving as an important venue for events such as the Belfast Festival at Queen's, the Belfast Film Festival and the CineMagic Festival.

The QFT is located on University Square and shares the building with the Brian Friel Theatre opened in February 2009 and used for student drama teaching, rehearsals and performances. The cinema has two screens with 204 and 91 seats respectively.

The QFT is part of the Europa Cinemas network containing more than 1,000 cinemas in 60 countries.

== History ==
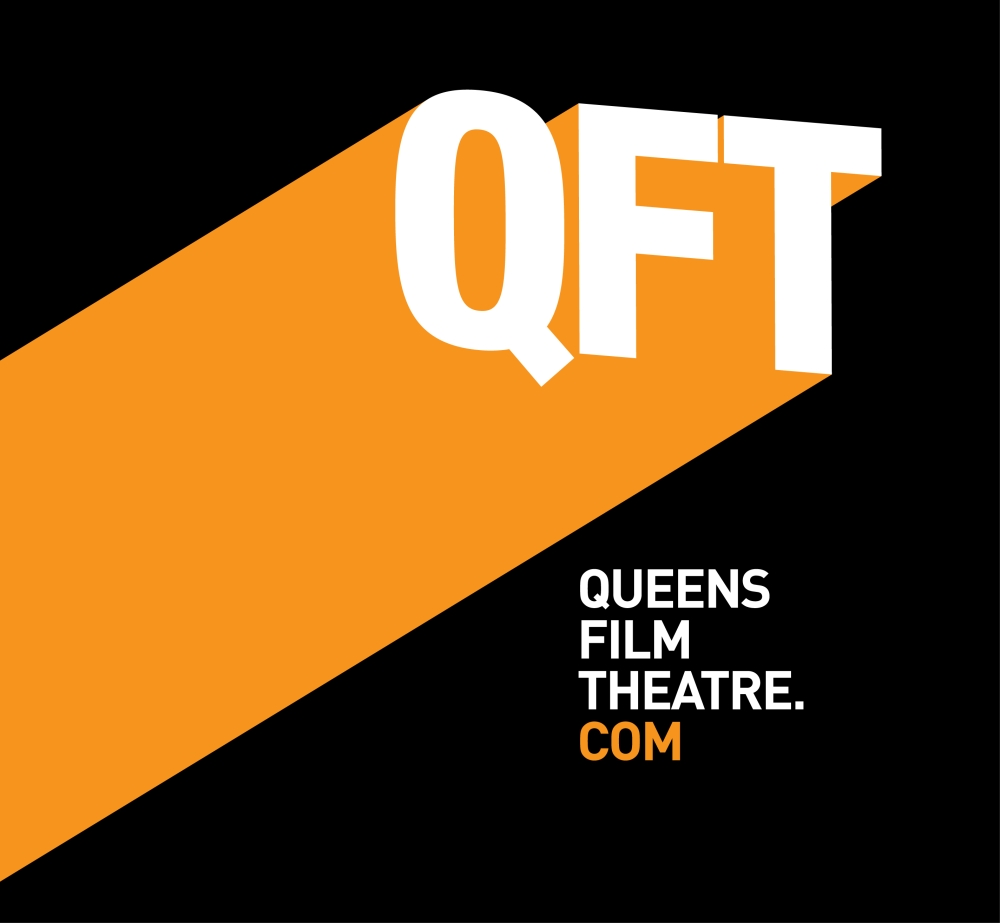
QFT logo

QFT was the brainchild of Michael Emmerson who, in 1967, as creator of the Belfast Film Festival (later Belfast Festival at Queen's) wanted a cultural cinema, in part to expand the range of festival events and also to develop a wider public awareness of the Festival throughout the year. He had been aware of the newly created Regional Film Theatres in Brighton and Newcastle upon Tyne and successfully persuaded the University to modify a newly built lecture theatre in University Square Mews into a 250 seat cinema. QFT opened on 16 October 1968 with a presentation of 'Viva Maria'.

The QFT, like most independent cinemas, faced financial difficulties for much of its early years, with one short closure in 1972. However following that closure it constructed a programming structure appropriate to the local demographic and largely managed to remain viable. As this building had been designed for undergraduate lectures, it was an uncomfortable customer experience. Following a period of relative financial success in 1985, the Arts Council of Northern Ireland funded a refurbishment providing new and very comfortable seating which was installed on 31 March 1986. Michael Open was the cinema's director from 1969 until 2004, except for a three-year period during the mid-1970s when it was run by Robert Caldicott. The next major investment in the facility came in 2003/4 and was University-led, formally integrating the QFT into the new Drama and Film Studies departments.

The cinema is currently funded through a number of sources, including ticket sales; grants from the University, Belfast City Council and Northern Ireland Screen; private donations; as well as a number of commercial sponsors. In 1996 it presented a celebrated season of classic cinema to celebrate the Centenary of Cinema. The Queen's Film Theatre currently forms part of the Culture and Arts Unit at the University which also includes the Naughton Gallery at Queen's.
