= Kettle =

Vessel used to boil water

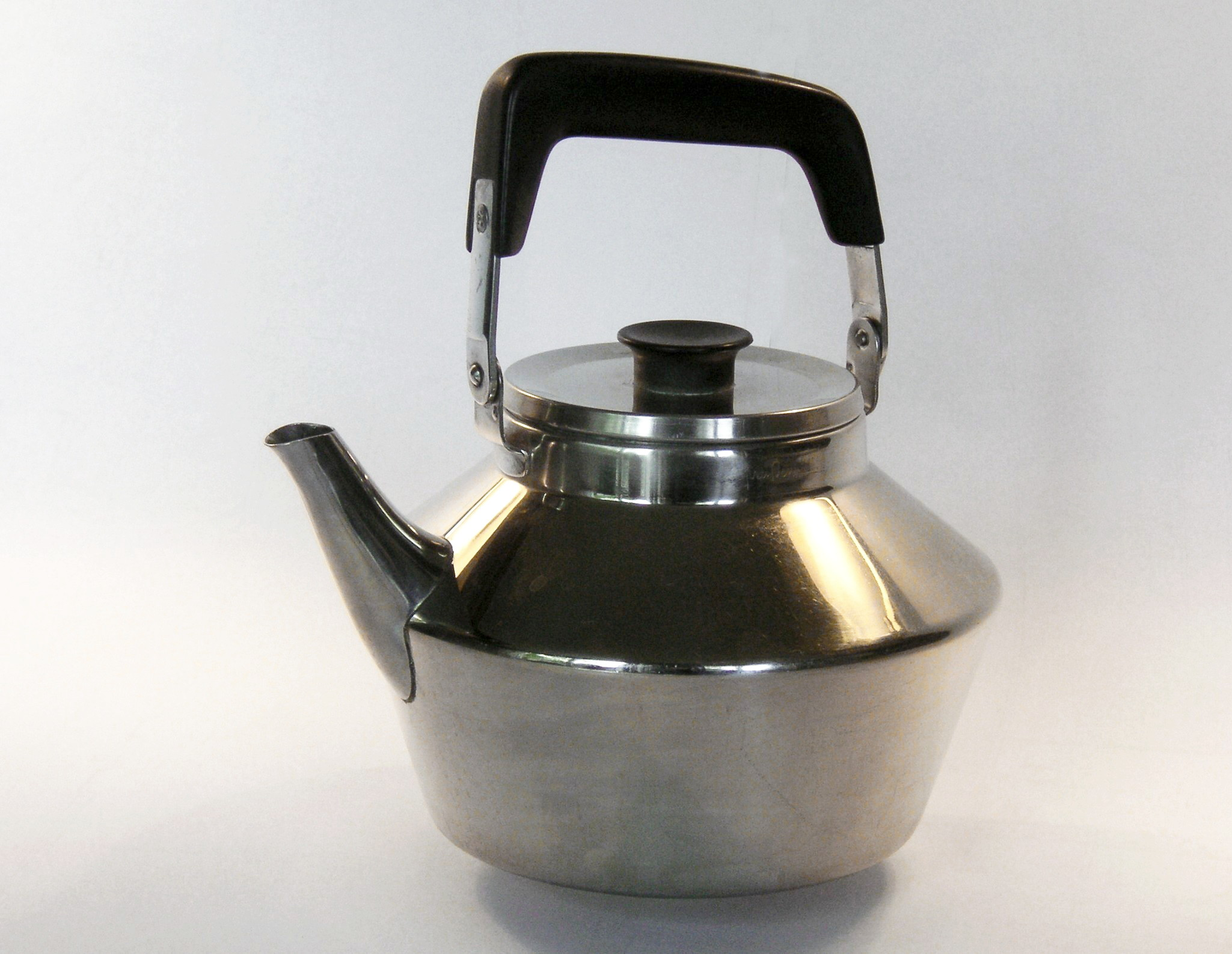
A traditional stainless steel kettle with a handle

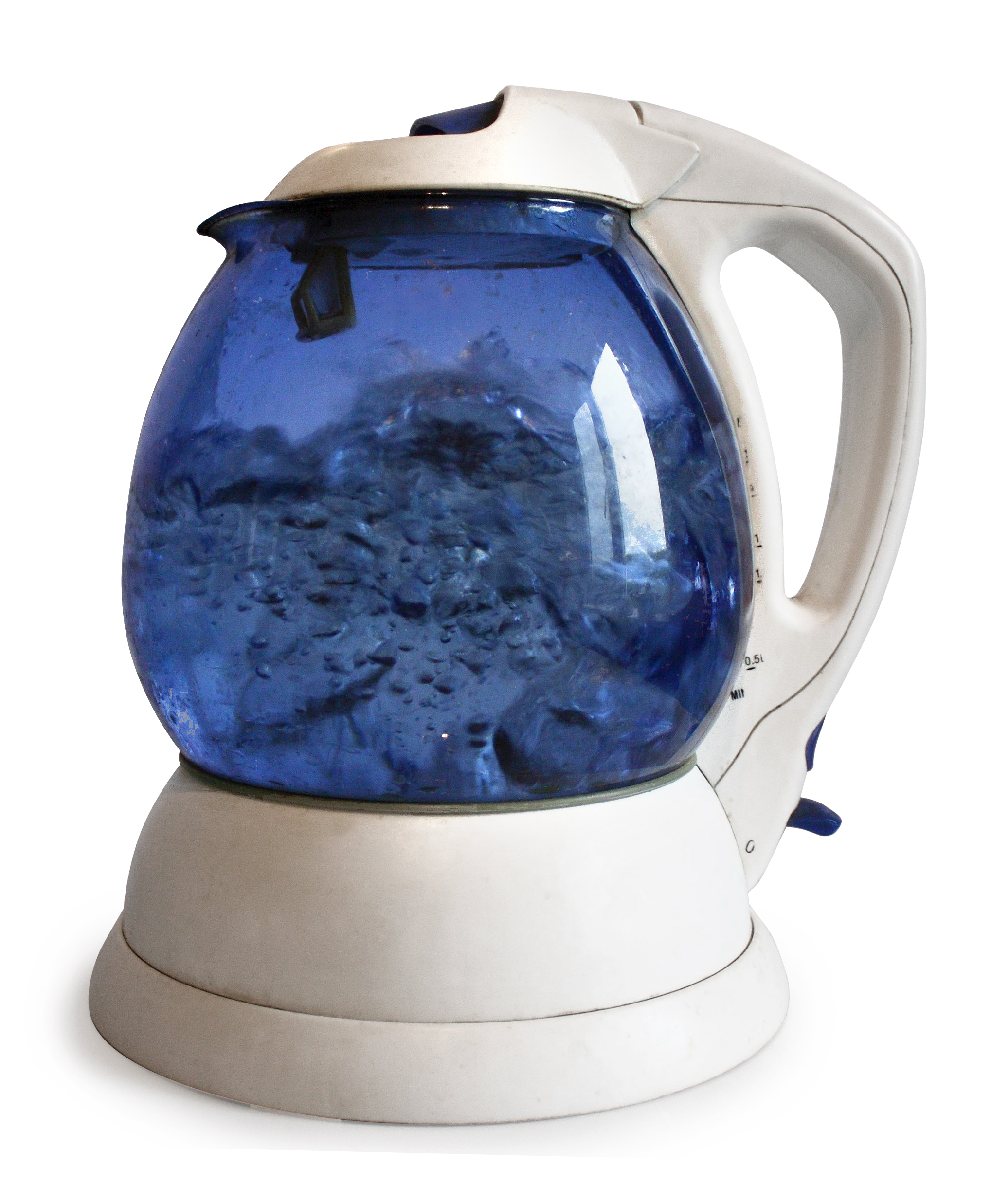
An electric kettle, with boiling water visible in its transparent water chamber

A kettle, sometimes called a tea kettle or teakettle, is a device specialized for boiling water, commonly with a lid, spout, and handle. There are two main types: the stovetop kettle, which uses heat from a hob, and the electric kettle, which is a small kitchen appliance with an internal heating element. Kettles are used mainly in the preparation of hot beverages, but also in food preparation.

== Etymology ==
The word kettle originates from Old Norse ketill, "cauldron". The Old English spelling was cetel with initial che- [tʃ] like 'cherry', Middle English (and dialectal) was chetel, both come (together with German Kessel "cauldron") ultimately from Germanic *katilaz, that was borrowed from Latin catillus, diminutive form of catinus "deep vessel for serving or cooking food", which in various contexts is translated as "bowl", "deep dish", or "funnel".

== Stovetop kettles ==
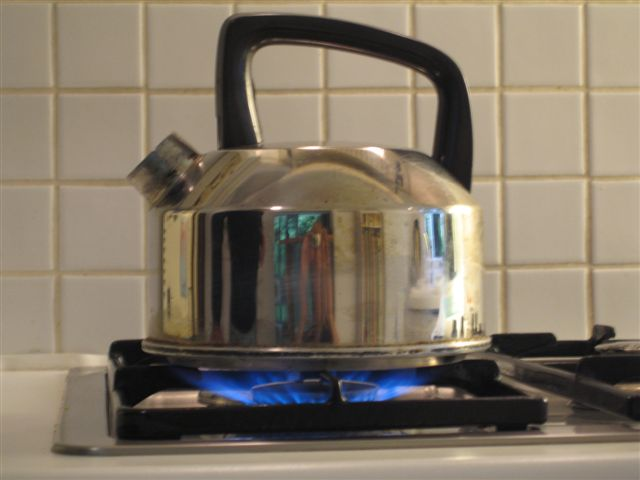
A stovetop kettle on a gas burner; this type, without a lid, is filled through the spout.

A modern stovetop kettle is a metal vessel with a flat bottom used to heat water on a stovetop. They usually have a handle on top, a spout, and a lid. Some also have a steam whistle that indicates when the water has reached its boiling point.

Stovetop kettles are typically made with stainless steel but can also be made from copper or other metals.

== Electric kettles ==
Electric kettles may also be used to boil water without the necessity of a stovetop. The heating element is typically fully enclosed, with a power rating of 2–3 kW. This means that the current draw for an electric kettle is up to 13 A, which is a significant proportion of the current available for many homes: the main fuse of most homes varies between 20 and 100 amps.

Thermal Vision video of water being boiled in an electric kettle

In modern designs, once the water has reached its boiling point, the kettle automatically deactivates, preventing the water from boiling away and damaging the heating element.

=== Development ===
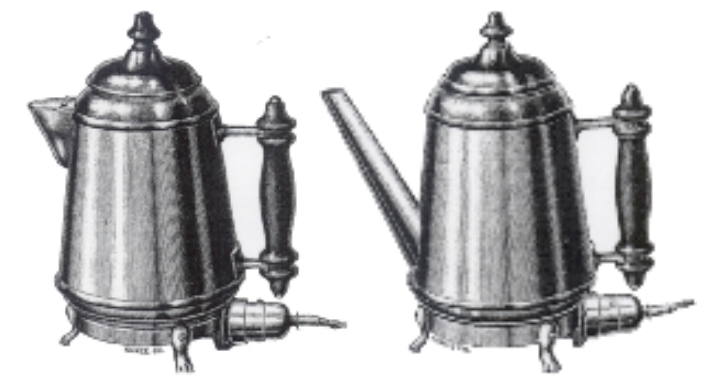
Drawings of the first electric kettles by Carpenter Electric Co. in 1891, the left one as a coffee pot and the right one as a teapot.

Electric kettles were introduced as an alternative to stovetop kettles in the latter part of the 19th century. General Electric sold electric kettles in London in 1890, In 1891 American company, Carpet Electric & Co., sold electric kettles, exhibited in London at Crystal Palace Exhibition in 1892 and in Chicago at the World's Columbian Exposition in 1893. In 1892, Crompton & Co. also exhibited a working electric kettle and started featuring it in their catalogue in 1894. These kettles were quite primitive as the heating element could not be immersed in the water. Instead, a separate compartment underneath the water storage area in the kettle was used to house the electric heating element. The design was inefficient even relative to the conventional stovetop kettles of the time.

In 1902, the 'Archer' electric kettle made by Premier Electric Heaters in Birmingham, England, was marketed as a luxury item. It had an element sealed in the base of the kettle (not exposed to water), and was one of the first kettles with a boil-safe device.

In 1922, Leslie Large, an engineer working at Bulpitt & Sons of Birmingham, designed an element of wire wound around a core and sheathed in a metal tube. The element could be immersed directly into water which made the kettle much more efficient than stovetop kettles.

In 1955, the newly founded British company Russell Hobbs brought out its stainless steel K1 model as the first fully automatic kettle. A bimetallic strip, heated through a pipe by the steam produced as the water comes to the boil, flexes, and cuts off the current. As little steam is produced before boiling occurs, the bimetallic thermostat is set to activate well below 100 °C (212 °F; 373 K), thus this design works even at higher altitudes where the boiling point is significantly lower. The design has since been widely adopted by other manufacturers.

== Whistling kettles ==
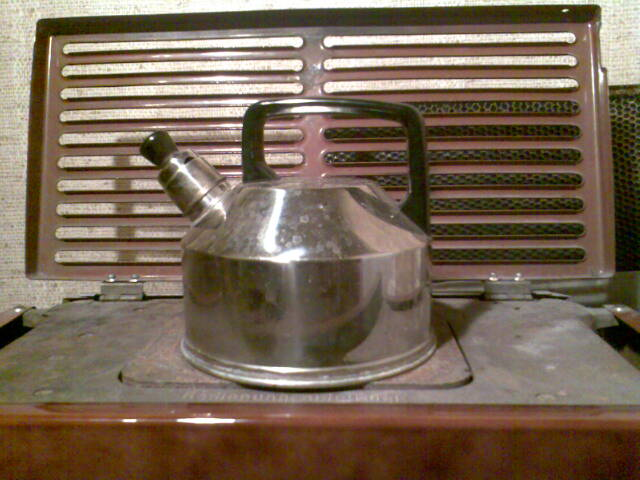
A kettle, with a detachable whistle over its spout

Whistling kettle
Coming to a boil, boiling, and cooling

A whistling kettle is a kettle fitted with a device that emits an audible whistle when the water in the kettle starts to boil. The action of steam passing through the device causes vibration, in turn creating the sound, known in physics as a tone hole.

The exact mechanism by which this occurs was not fully understood until a paper, The Aeroacoustics of a Steam Kettle, was published by R. H. Henrywood, a fourth-year engineering undergraduate at the University of Cambridge, and A. Agarwal, his supervisor, in the journal Physics of Fluids in 2013.

Harry Bramson is the inventor of the whistling tea kettle.

== Automatic tea kettles ==
Automatic tea kettles are meant to make tea brewing easier, built with the capability to make different kinds of tea without much input from the user. Once set, the automatic tea kettle brings the water to the specific temperature for preparing a given kind of tea, adds the tea to the water, and steeps the tea for the appropriate amount of time. This is because different types of teas must be brewed at different temperatures in order to create a full, balanced flavor. Often they will make a beeping sound to alert the user when the tea is ready, and maintain the temperature of the beverage after preparation.

== Kettle gallery ==
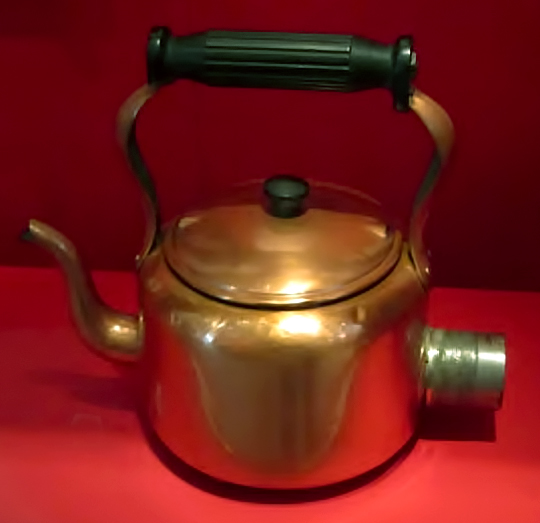
Swan electric kettle in brass, an early electric kettle at the Museum of Liverpool

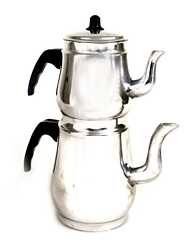
Aluminium çaydanlık. A unique instrument of Turkish cuisine.

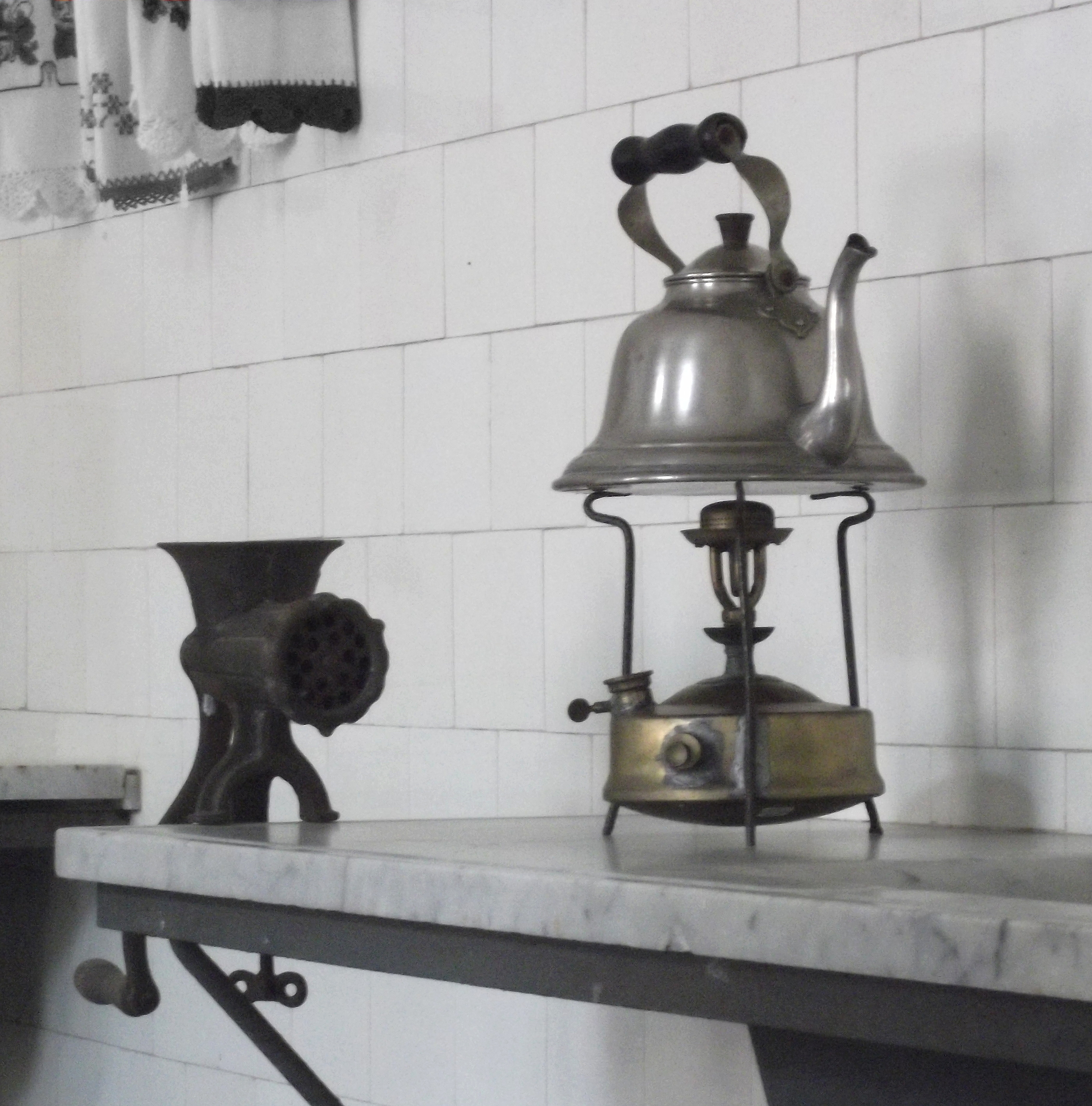
Kettle on a portable stove at the Museu da Baronesa, Brazil

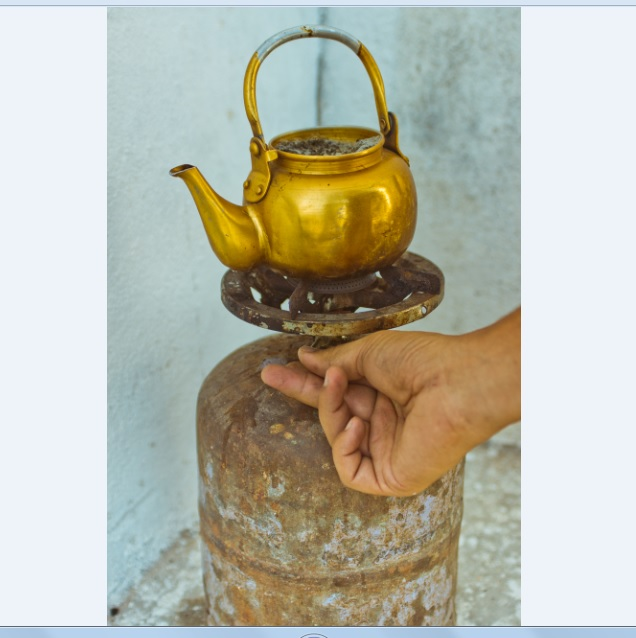
Modest tea kettle boiling water over small bottled gas at a tea house.

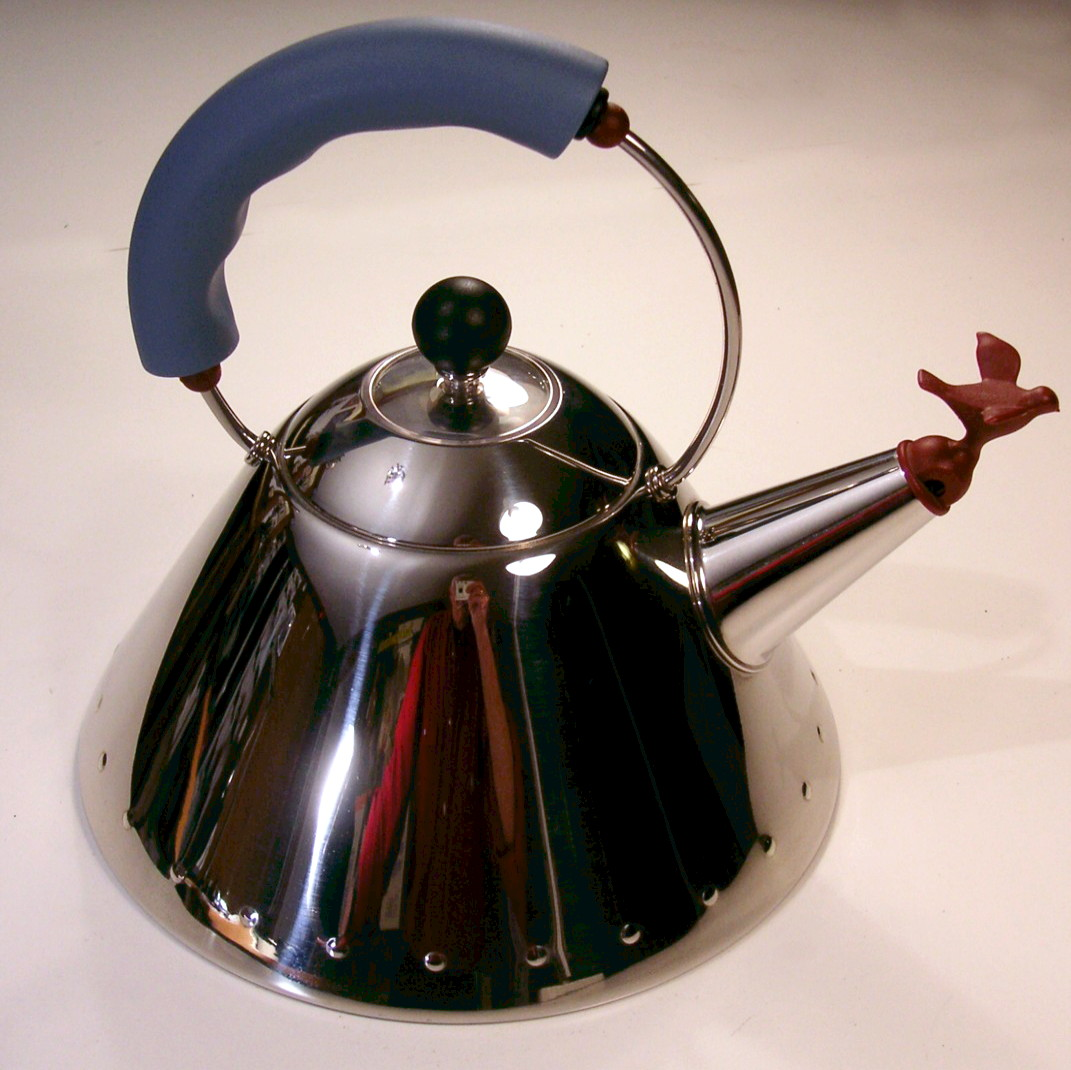
Graves kettle, 1984, a postmodern kettle with a bird-shaped whistle on the spout

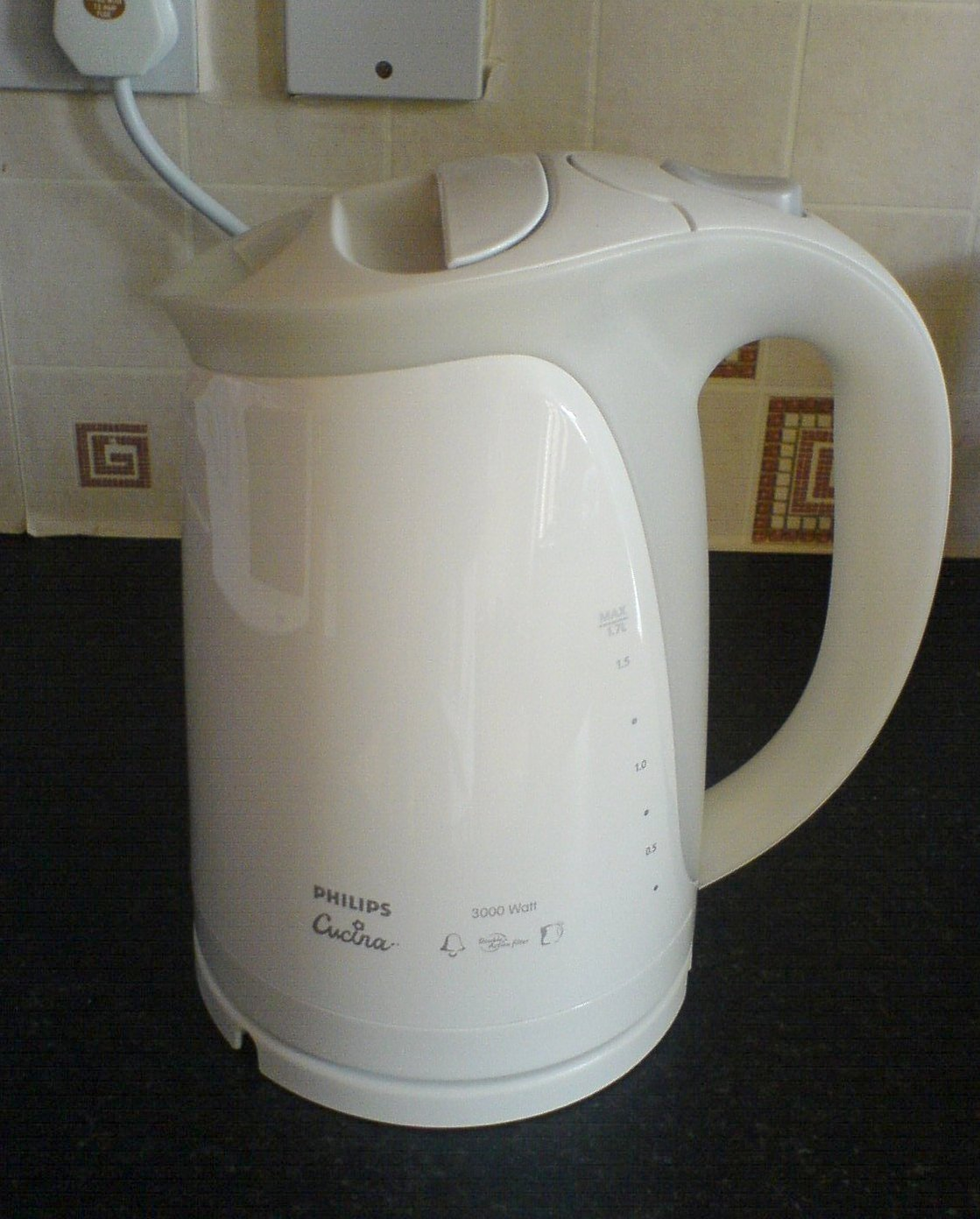
A contemporary "jug"‑style electric kettle made from enameled metal and plastic

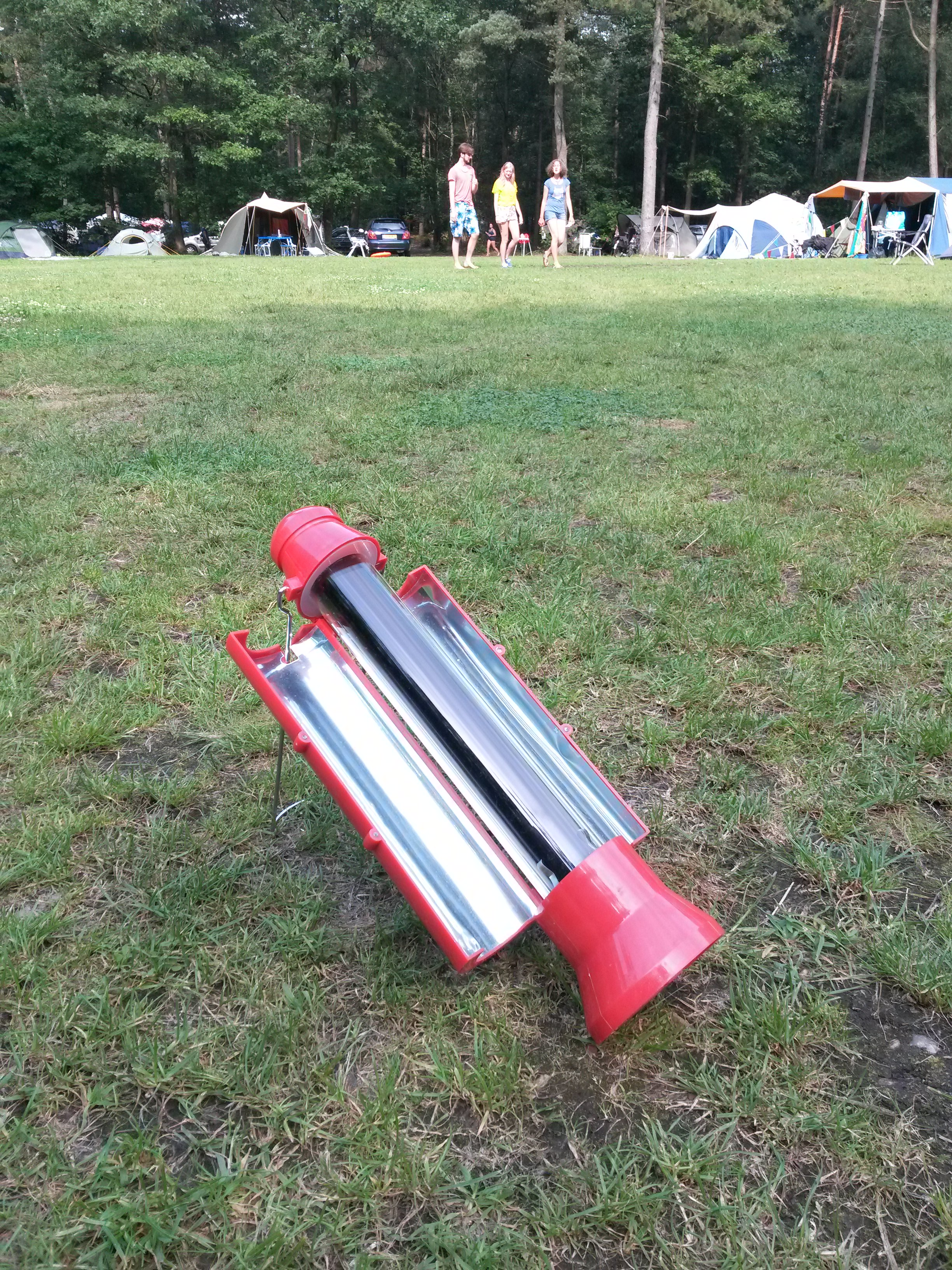
Solar powered kettle

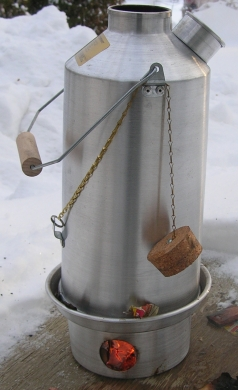
A Kelly kettle, designed to efficiently use the heat of a small fire in a chamber at the base

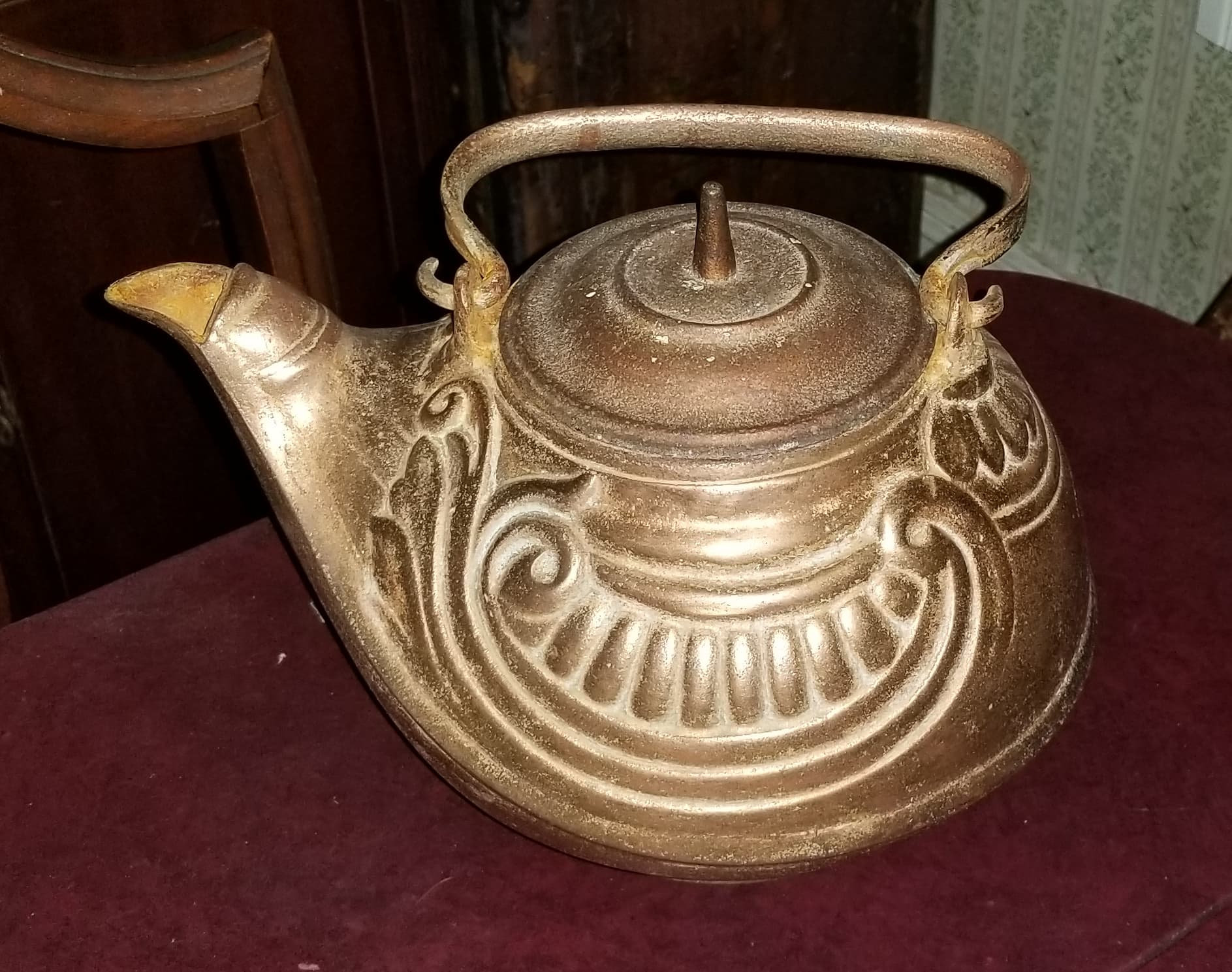
Copper coated cast iron stove tea kettle made between 1846 and 1860. Albany/Troy NY, USA

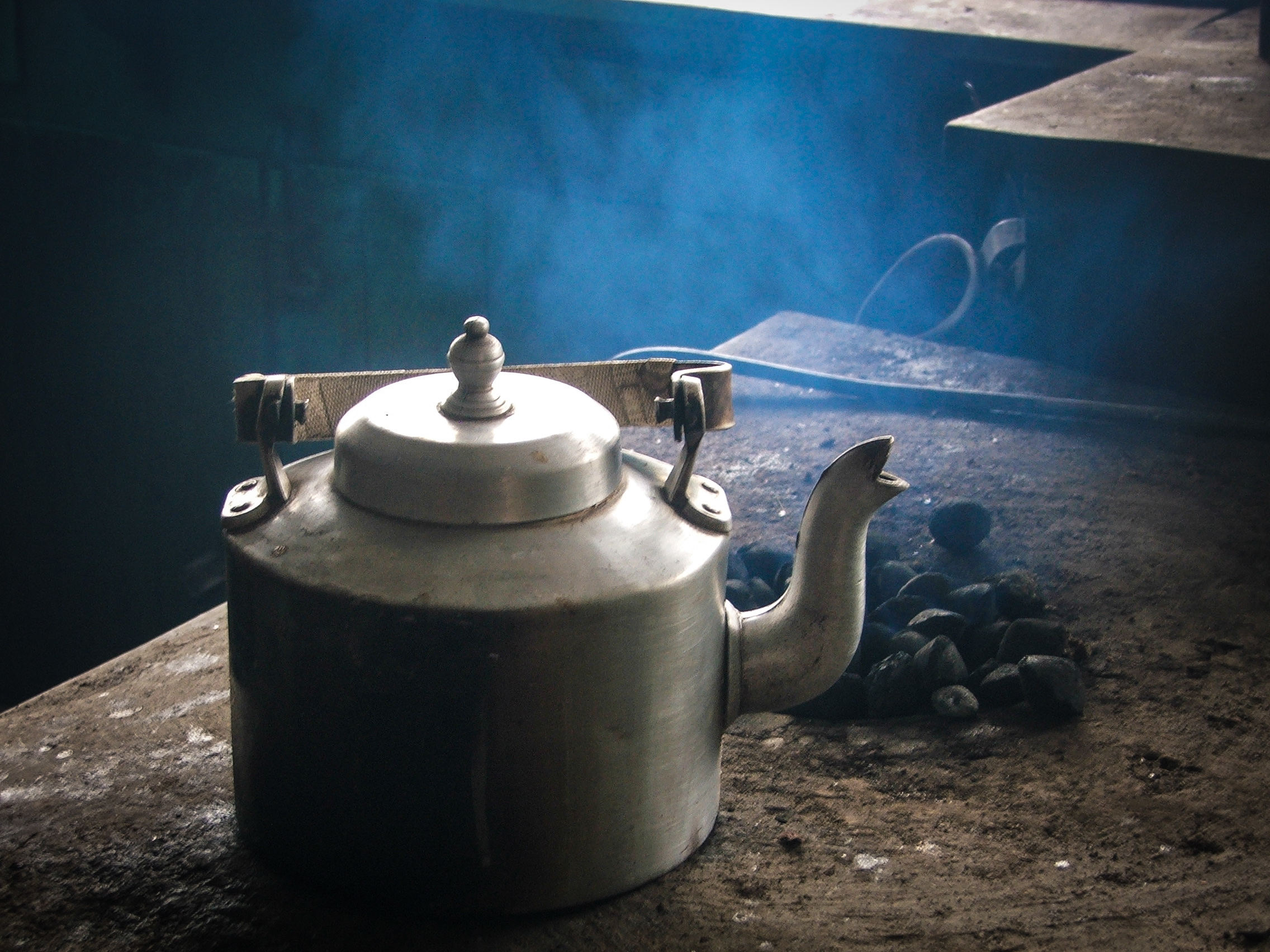
An Indian aluminium kettle, popular in South Asia, used for making tea or boiling water

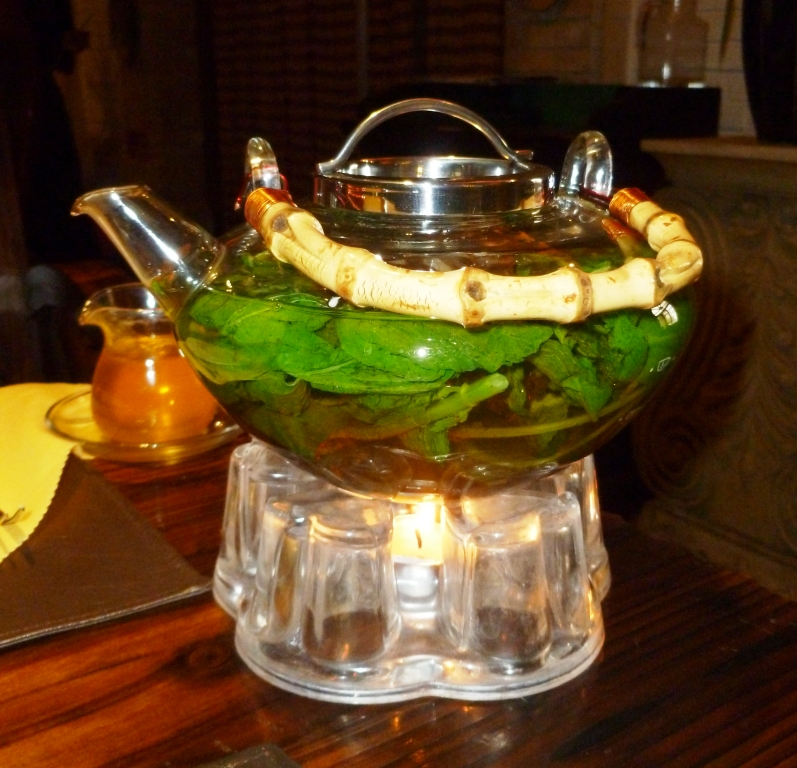
Glass tea kettle in Kashgar in 2010

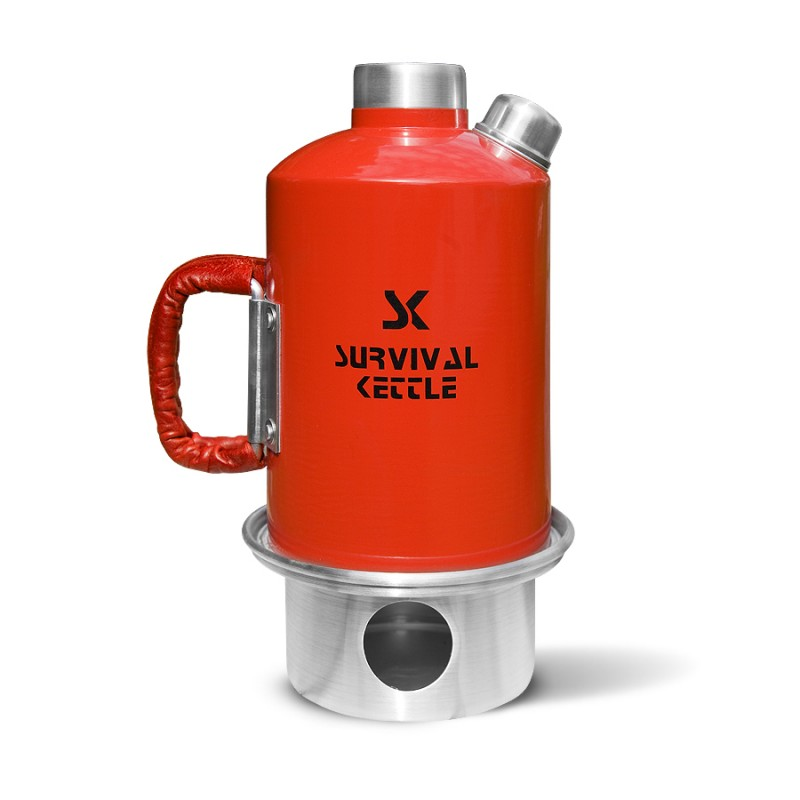
Survival Kettle Red in 2019

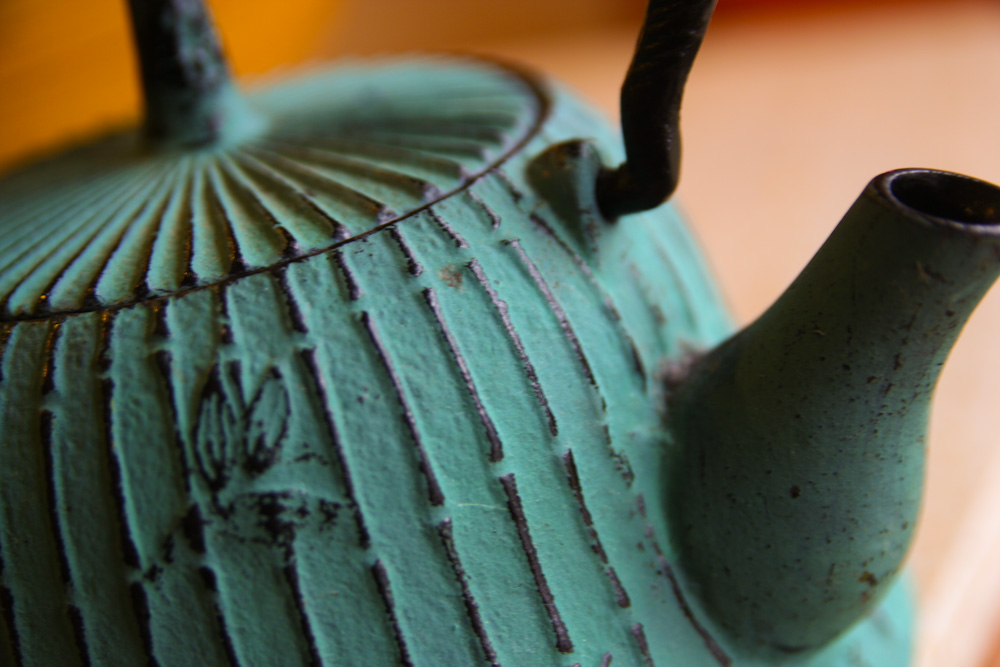
Tetsubin (鉄瓶), Japanese cast iron kettle or teapot.

== Similar devices ==
- A cauldron is a large kettle hung over an open fire, usually on an arc-shaped hanger called a bail. In Hungary these are referred to as kettles.
- A fish kettle is a long slim metal cooking vessel with a tight fitting lid to enable cooking of whole large fish such as salmon.
- A kettle grill is a dome shaped grill with a rounded lid, resembling a cauldron.
- A kettle drum is a kettle (cauldron) shaped drum.
- Kelly Kettle

== See also ==
- Boiling vessel, water heating system in British tanks.
- Coffeemaker
- Kelly Kettle, specialized types of kettles for outdoor use, intended to use fuel more efficiently.
- Kettle corn, a sweet variety of popcorn that is typically mixed or seasoned with a light-colored refined sugar, salt, and oil. It was traditionally made in cast iron kettles, hence the name.
- Percolator
- Samovar, a kettle with a central firepit and chimney for making tea, originating in Russia.
- Tea culture
- Teapot, a vessel with a spout, lid, and handle, for brewing and serving tea.
- Teasmade, an English appliance that combined a kettle and a teapot to make tea automatically by a clock.
- Tetsubin, a cast iron Japanese pot with a spout.
- Windermere kettle
- The pot calling the kettle black
- Teaware
- Kettlebell
