= Martin Naughton (businessman) =

Irish billionaire businessman (1939–2026)

- Born: 2 May 1939; Dundalk, County Louth, Ireland
- Died: 3 July 2026 (aged 87); Seattle, Washington, U.S.
- Education: De La Salle College Dundalk
- Occupations: Engineer, businessman
- Known for: Founder of GlenDimplex
- Spouse: Carmel Naughton
- Children: 3

Martin Naughton (2 May 1939 – 3 July 2026) was an Irish billionaire businessman, engineer and philanthropist. He was the founder of GlenDimplex, a company specialising in electrical appliances. He was associated with Trinity College Dublin as a benefactor since the 1990s, including donating €25 million, which led to the awarding of an honorary doctorate in 1995.

== Early life and education ==
Naughton was born on 2 May 1939. He was educated at De La Salle College Dundalk, where he funded an annual scholarship programme. He was a donor to a number of educational institutions, notably Trinity College Dublin and the University of Notre Dame.

== Career ==
Naughton founded Glen Electric in August 1973 with a small manufacturing facility employing ten people in Newry, County Down, Northern Ireland. In 1977, Dimplex, the leading brand in the UK electrical heating market was acquired by Glen Electrics forming the Glen Dimplex Group. The company set out acquiring further businesses across the UK, with Morphy Richards, the market leader in small domestic appliances in 1985 followed by Blanella, a manufacturer of electric blankets and Burco Dean Appliances, a manufacturer of products for the catering industry, all in the same year.

The 1990s saw the company acquire further businesses across Europe and beyond. An engineer by profession, Naughton had grown his company to become the world's largest manufacturer in domestic heating appliances. The company has plants in Ireland, the United Kingdom and North America. The business has more than 8,000 staff and 22 manufacturing facilities with annual sales of around $1.6 billion. Naughton's stake in the company was worth around £273 million with other investments including an art collection, property in Dublin and shares in the Merrion Hotel Group and the Sunday Tribune newspaper.

Naughton was involved in negotiating cross-border trade and promotion and support of businesses during the Northern Ireland conflict.

== Naughton Foundation ==
Naughton and his wife Carmel founded the Naughton Foundation in 1994. A scholarship fund was added in 2008, which originally assisted students in the Louth, Meath, Monaghan area, before being offered to STEM students across the island more recently.

== Personal life and death ==
Martin Naughton was married to Carmel Naughton, with three children, and lived in County Meath. In 2016, his son Fergal Naughton took over as CEO of GlenDimplex. In 2016, Naughton and his wife Carmel were named philanthropists of the year by the Community Foundation for Ireland.

In May 2018, Business for Peace Foundation gave Naughton a Business for Peace Award in recognition of his efforts in promoting the private sector's contribution to peace and environmental sustainability. In November 2018, he was named as the Outstanding Contribution to Business Award winner at the Irish Post Awards 2018.

Naughton lived at Stackallan House, County Meath which he purchased from Margaret Heffernan.

Naughton died while travelling in Seattle, Washington, on 3 July 2026, at the age of 87.

== Honours ==
In 1995, Trinity College Dublin awarded him an honorary doctorate. In 2016, Naughton was awarded the French Légion d'Honneur. In 2017, Dublin City University awarded him an honorary doctorate. In 2025, Pope Francis conferred the Order of Saint Gregory the Great on Naughton and his wife.
