= Nechtan =

Nechtan or Nectan may refer to:

== Kings ==
- Nechtan Morbet (fl. 5th or 6th century), king of the Picts
- Nechtan nepos Uerb (fl. 7th century), king of the Picts
- Nechtan mac Der-Ilei (died 732), king of the Picts

== Other people ==
- Nechtan of Aberdeen (fl. 12th century), bishop of Aberdeen
- Saint Nectan of Hartland (fl. 5th/6th century), associated with Devon and Cornwall
- Saint Nectan, nephew and disciple of Saint Patrick

== Mythology ==
- Nechtan Scéne, a character in the Irish Ulster Cycle
- Nechtan (mythology), an Irish god
- Nechtan mac Collbran, an Irish mythological character in the Voyage of Bran

== See also ==
- Neithon of Alt Clut (fl. 7th century), King of Strathclyde
