= Brian Friel Theatre =

Studio theatre at Queen's University, Belfast, Northern Ireland

Coordinates: 54.58545°N 5.93395°W

- Interactive map of Brian Friel Theatre
- Address: 20 University Square; Belfast; Northern Ireland
- Owner: Queen's University Belfast
- Capacity: 120
- Type: Studio theatre

Construction
- Opened: 20 February 2009

Website
- www.brianfrieltheatre.co.uk

The Brian Friel Theatre is a studio theatre located at Queen's University Belfast, Northern Ireland. It was opened in February 2009 and is named after the Irish playwright, theatre director and author, Brian Friel.

The Theatre is part of the university's School of Languages, Literature and Performing Arts and the Brian Friel Centre for Theatre Research. It provides space for student drama teaching, rehearsals and performances and hosts both student and professional performances and events such as the Belfast International Arts Festival.

The Brian Friel Theatre is located on University Square and shares its building with the Queen's Film Theatre.

== See also ==
- Lyric Theatre, Belfast
