= Electric fireplace =

Electric heater that mimics a fireplace

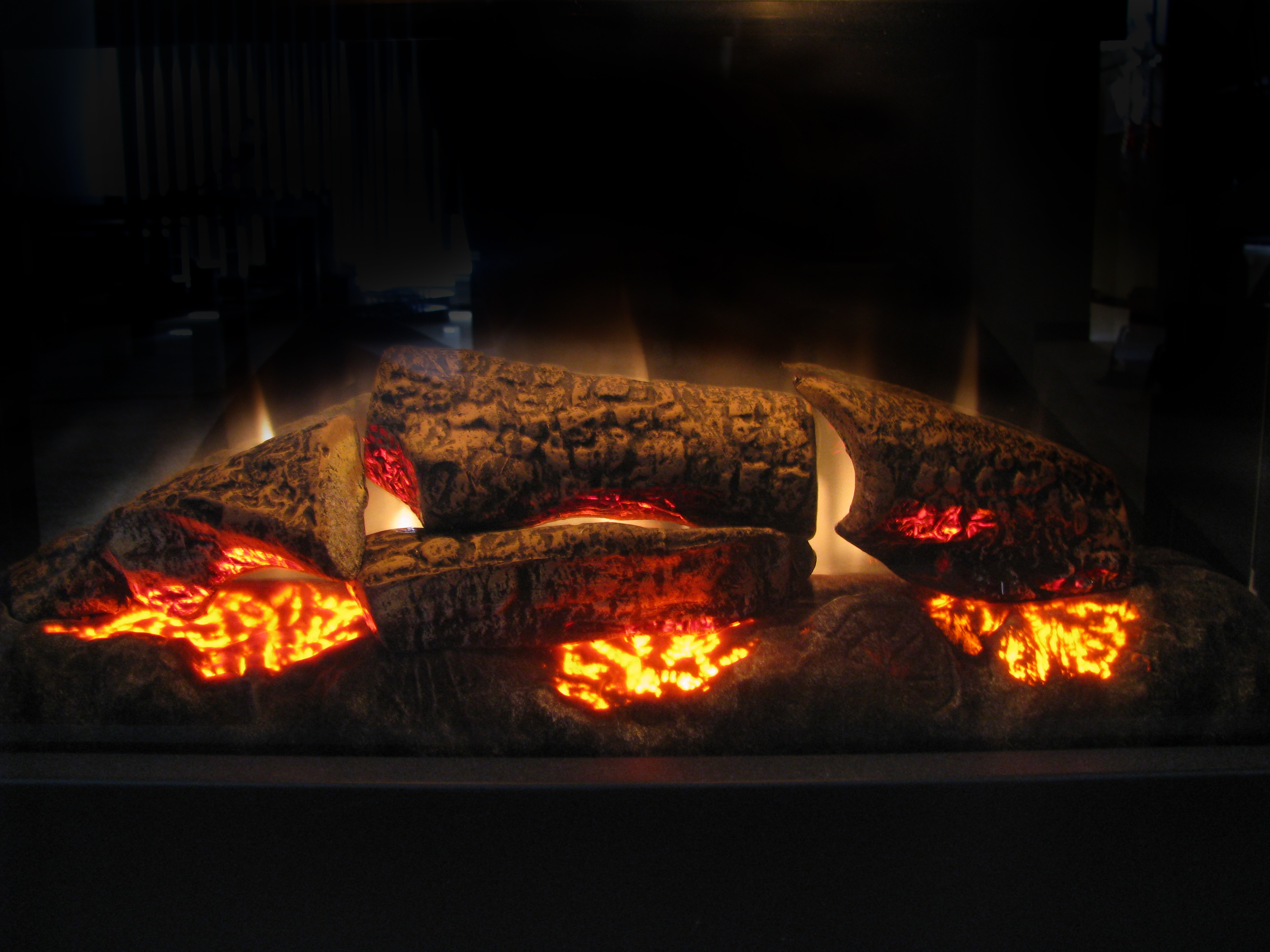
An electric fireplace.

An electric fireplace is an electric heater that mimics a fireplace burning coal, wood, or natural gas. Electric fireplaces are often placed in conventional fireplaces, which can then no longer be used for conventional fires. They plug into the wall, and can run on a "flame only" setting, or can be used as a heater, typically consuming 1.4 to 1.6 kW to heat a 40 m^{2} room.

== History ==
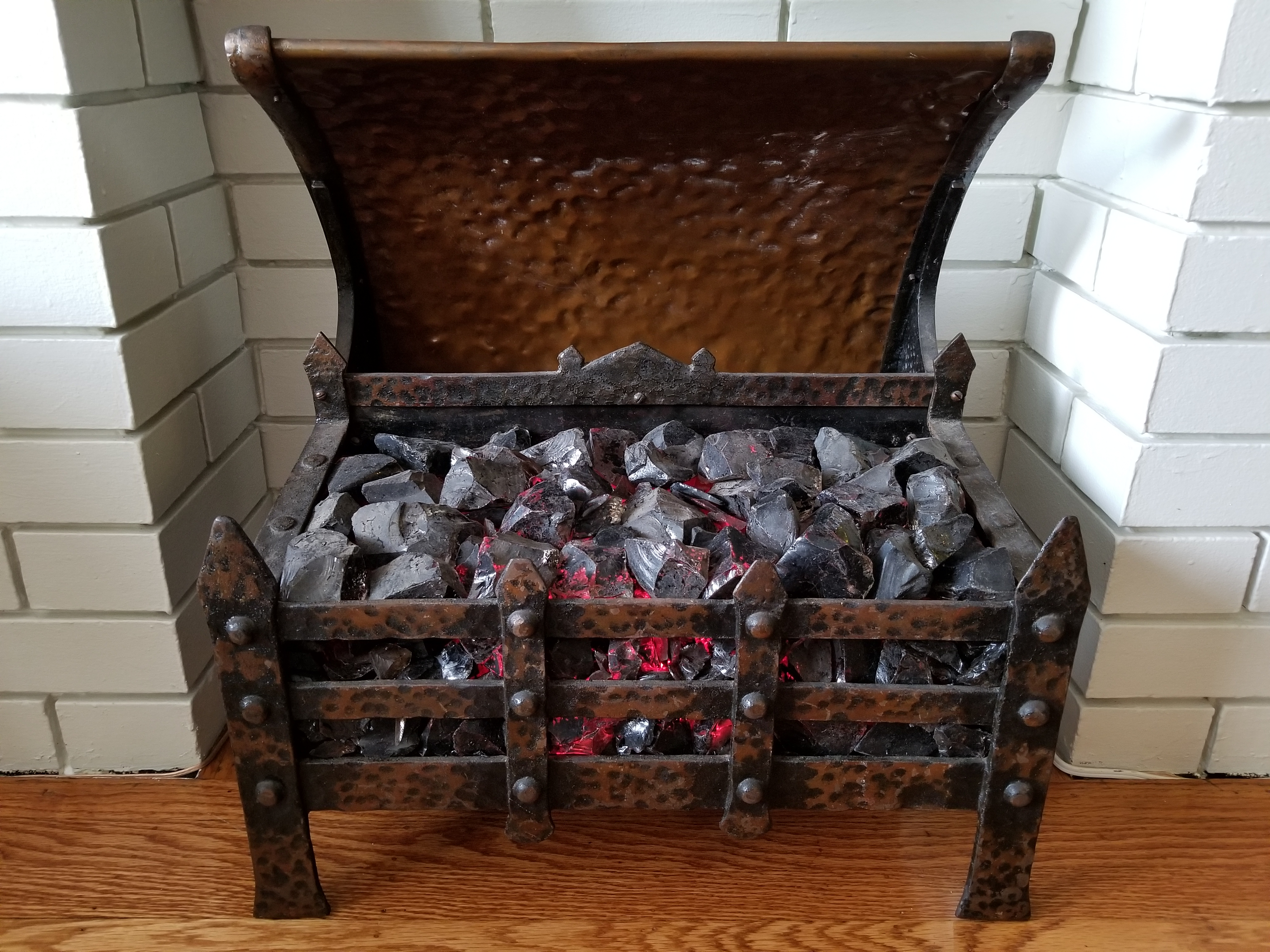
A 1920s coal basket style electric fireplace. The flickering effect is achieved by mounting a fan atop an incandescent bulb, which rotates due to the heat rising from the bulb. This fireplace has been rewired and the original heating element has been removed due to safety concerns.

The electric fire was invented in 1912 and became popular in the 1950s. Electric fireplaces found in 1950s homes were typically small and could be easily moved.

Techniques for electrical "flame effects" have been around since at least 1981.

Commercial electric fireplace techniques include the Optiflame, introduced in 1988 by Dimplex.

Dimplex claims to have produced the first electric fireplace with a "realistic" wood-burning flame effect in 1995. It is unclear what specific technique is being referred to, although it may be U.S. patent 5,642,580.

In 2008 Dimplex launched the Opti-myst effect which simulates both flames and smoke.

In 2013 Dimplex launched the Opti-V effect which combines realistic flickering flames with three dimensional LED logs that sporadically sparks and an audio element of crackling logs.

== Technology ==
=== Heating techniques ===
Many electric fireplaces have heating coils that produce heat as electricity flows through it. The heated air is propelled out into open space by a fan. Other heating techniques used in electric fireplaces include PTC ceramic heating and infrared technology.

=== Controls ===
Electric fireplaces are typically controlled by a remote or a set of buttons in which the temperature, lighting, and flame effects can be controlled. Some electric fireplaces are connected to an app in which the controls can be changed from the user's cell phone.

== Advantages compared to traditional fireplaces ==
Advantages of electric fireplaces are that they:

- do not require chimneys.
- are often portable.
- do not require remodeling to install.
- are more economical.
- are more convenient.
- are safer to use (no risk of catching fire, inhaling smoke or gas, or overheating).
- can be installed without professional assistance.
- are better for the environment than wood burning and gas fireplaces.
- do not require the maintenance needed for wood burning or gas fireplaces.

== Disadvantages compared to traditional fireplaces ==
Disadvantages of electric fireplaces are that they:

- can be more expensive to operate in rural areas compared to gas or wood burning heaters due to price of electricity.
- are sometimes not as realistic as real flames, even those in gas fireplaces. Additionally, they can lack other sensual cues of a real fire like the smell of burning wood, or crackle of a burning log.

== See also ==
- Firebox
- Fireplace insert
- Fireplace mantel
- Wood-fired oven
