= GlenDimplex =

Irish consumer electrical goods firm

- Formerly: Glen Electric
- Type: Private company
- Industry: Electronics
- Founded: 23 August 1973; 53 years ago in Newry, Northern Ireland (Glen Electric); 7 June 1978; 48 years ago (GlenDimplex)
- Founder: Martin Naughton
- Headquarters: Dublin, Ireland
- Key people: Fergal Naughton (CEO)
- Products: Heating, cooling radio and cooking equipment, etc.
- Revenue: ▲€962.7m (2024)
- Owner: Martin Naughton (majority)
- Number of employees: 8,500 (2004)
- Website: glendimplex.com

GlenDimplex (formerly known as Glen Electric) is an Irish consumer electrical goods firm headquartered in Dublin, Ireland. The company is privately held, with manufacturing and development centres in the Republic of Ireland, the United Kingdom, China and many other locations around the world.

The company also has branches in North America, Germany, the Netherlands, Japan, Poland, Belgium, France, Australia and Scandinavia. The company was founded by Martin Naughton, and is wholly owned by him after he bought out the other shareholders in 2004. Sean O'Driscoll became CEO of Glen Dimplex in 1998 and from 2011 held the positions of chairman and group chief executive until his retirement in 2016. Fergal Naughton was then appointed as Group CEO. Fergal Leamy assumed the role of CEO in 2021. Leamy stepped down in 2025 and was succeeded by Fergal Naughton.

== History ==
The company was incorporated on 23 August 1973, as Glen Electric in Newry, Northern Ireland, an electric heater manufacturer with ten employees. Dimplex, a large electric heating appliance manufacturer, was founded in the 1950s. The companies merged on 6 May 1977 to become Glen Dimplex.

Morphy Richards and Burco Dean Appliances were acquired by the Glen Dimplex Group in 1985, and were based in Mexborough near Doncaster, England.

Belling was acquired in July 1992, Roberts Radio in November 1994, Goblin Vacuum Cleaners in June 1998, LEC Refrigeration in March 2005, Robinson Willey in August 2010, Valor in September 2011, and Real Flame Australia in February 2016. Dimplex was the shirt sponsor of Southampton Football Club from 1993 until 1995.

In 2018 the Merseyside-based home appliances division, which makes cookers and refrigerators under the Britannia, Lec, New World and Stoves brands, announced a "streamlining" of operations, resulting in up to 300 of its 1,000 permanent staff at its Knowsley plant being made redundant.

== Brands and acquisitions ==
Name of brand (or company)	Industry and/or centered products	Year acquired or merged (if applicable)
Dimplex Glen Electric	Electric fireplaces, heating Electric heating	1977
Morphy Richards Burco Dean	Domestic appliances	1985
Belling	Cooking appliances	1992
Roberts Radio	Radio	1994
Goblin Vacuum Cleaners	Vacuum cleaners	1998
EWT Elektrogerate	Electric panel heaters, fireplaces	1999
Faber Stoves Group	Gas heaters Stoves	2000
New World	Cooking appliances	2001
NOBØ	Heating	2002
Galaxy Showers	Showers	2003
LEC Refrigeration	Refrigeration	2005
RXG Redring Xpelair Koolant Koolers Schrieber Engineering (Koolant and Schrieber merged to form Dimplex Thermal Solutions)	Electric water heating Industrial liquid insulated coolers	2006
Masport Heating	Wood and gas burning cast iron stoves	2008
Robinson Willey Wonderfire	Heating Gas heaters	2010
Valor	Heating	2011
Britannia Living Appliances	Cooking appliances	2013
Real Flame Australia Walker Technology Technika Australia Cadet Heat	Electric and gas fireplaces Set-top box and television distributor Domestic appliances Electric Heat	2016
Carmen Personal Care	Personal care	Not applicable
Ability Projects	Air Conditioning	2017
Euromaid Baumatic Arc Appliances IAG Appliances Venini Lemair	Domestic appliances Cooking appliances Refrigeration	2018
Smarter Data Management Limited	Software	2022
Frerings	Consumer goods	1989
