= List of United Kingdom locations: North H-Nz =

The United Kingdom

This is part of the list of United Kingdom locations: a gazetteer of place names in the United Kingdom showing each place's locality and geographical coordinates.

== No (continued) ==
=== North H – North M ===
Location	Locality	Coordinates (links to map & photo sources)	OS grid reference
North Halling	Kent	51.35°N 00.44°E	TQ7065
North Harrow	Harrow	51.57°N 00.37°W	TQ1388
North Havra	Shetland Islands	60.16°N 01.34°W	HU367424
North Hayling	Hampshire	50.82°N 00.96°W	SU7303
North Heasley	Devon	51.08°N 03.81°W	SS7333
North Heath	West Sussex	50.97°N 00.49°W	TQ0621
North Heath	Berkshire	51.46°N 01.35°W	SU4574
North Hill	Cornwall	50.55°N 04.44°W	SX2776
North Hillingdon	Hillingdon	51.54°N 00.44°W	TQ0884
North Hinksey Village	Oxfordshire	51.74°N 01.29°W	SP4905
North Holmwood	Surrey	51.21°N 00.34°W	TQ1647
North Houghton	Hampshire	51.09°N 01.51°W	SU3433
North Howden	East Riding of Yorkshire	53.76°N 00.86°W	SE7530
North Huish	Devon	50.38°N 03.81°W	SX7156
North Hyde	Hounslow	51.49°N 00.38°W	TQ1278
North Hykeham	Lincolnshire	53.18°N 00.59°W	SK9466
North Hylton	Sunderland	54.90°N 01.47°W	NZ3457
Northiam	East Sussex	50.98°N 00.59°E	TQ8224
Northill	Bedfordshire	52.10°N 00.33°W	TL1446
North Inch	Perth and Kinross	56.40°N 03.44°W	NO1124
Northington	Hampshire	51.12°N 01.20°W	SU5637
Northington	Gloucestershire	51.77°N 02.43°W	SO7008
North Kelsey	Lincolnshire	53.49°N 00.43°W	TA0401
North Kelsey Moor	Lincolnshire	53.50°N 00.38°W	TA0702
North Kensington	Hammersmith and Fulham	51.51°N 00.22°W	TQ2381
North Kessock	Highland	57.50°N 04.25°W	NH6548
North Killingholme	North Lincolnshire	53.63°N 00.27°W	TA1417
North Kilvington	North Yorkshire	54.25°N 01.35°W	SE4285
North Kilworth	Leicestershire	52.44°N 01.10°W	SP6183
North Kingston	Hampshire	50.81°N 01.77°W	SU1602
North Kiscadale	North Ayrshire	55.48°N 05.10°W	NS0426
North Kyme	Lincolnshire	53.05°N 00.28°W	TF1552
North Lancing	West Sussex	50.83°N 00.32°W	TQ1805
Northlands	Lincolnshire	53.05°N -00.00°E	TF3453
Northlea	Durham	54.84°N 01.36°W	NZ4150
Northleach	Gloucestershire	51.82°N 01.84°W	SP1114
North Lee	Buckinghamshire	51.76°N 00.79°W	SP8308
North Lees	North Yorkshire	54.15°N 01.54°W	SE3073
Northleigh (North Devon)	Devon	51.08°N 04.00°W	SS6034
Northleigh (East Devon)	Devon	50.75°N 03.14°W	SY1996
North Leigh	Kent	51.18°N 01.04°E	TR1347
North Leigh	Oxfordshire	51.80°N 01.45°W	SP3812
North Leverton with Habblesthorpe	Nottinghamshire	53.32°N 00.83°W	SK7882
Northlew	Devon	50.77°N 04.12°W	SX5099
North Littleton	Worcestershire	52.12°N 01.88°W	SP0847
North Lochboisdale	Western Isles	57.15°N 07.34°W	NF7720
North Looe	Surrey	51.32°N 00.25°W	TQ2260
North Lopham	Norfolk	52.40°N 00.98°E	TM0383
North Luffenham	Rutland	52.61°N 00.62°W	SK9303
North Marden	West Sussex	50.93°N 00.86°W	SU8016
North Marston	Buckinghamshire	51.89°N 00.88°W	SP7722
North Middleton	Northumberland	55.51°N 02.01°W	NT9924
North Middleton	Midlothian	55.82°N 03.03°W	NT3559
North Milmain	Dumfries and Galloway	54.82°N 04.99°W	NX0852
North Molton	Devon	51.04°N 03.81°W	SS7329
Northmoor	Devon	50.91°N 04.42°W	SS3016
Northmoor	Oxfordshire	51.71°N 01.39°W	SP4202
Northmoor Corner	Somerset	51.06°N 02.98°W	ST3130
Northmoor Green or Moorland	Somerset	51.08°N 02.95°W	ST3332
North Morar	Highland	56.96°N 05.65°W	NM779917
North Moreton	Oxfordshire	51.59°N 01.19°W	SU5689
Northmostown	Devon	50.69°N 03.28°W	SY0989
North Motherwell	North Lanarkshire	55.79°N 04.01°W	NS7457
North Moulsecoomb	Brighton and Hove	50.84°N 00.11°W	TQ3307
Northmuir	Angus	56.68°N 03.01°W	NO3855
North Mundham	West Sussex	50.81°N 00.76°W	SU8702
North Muskham	Nottinghamshire	53.11°N 00.82°W	SK7958

=== North N – North S ===
Location	Locality	Coordinates (links to map & photo sources)	OS grid reference
North Neaps	Shetland Islands	60.72°N 01.12°W	HP478047
North Ness	Orkney Islands	58.80°N 03.21°W	ND3091
North Nevay	Angus	56.58°N 03.10°W	NO3244
North Newbald	East Riding of Yorkshire	53.81°N 00.61°W	SE9136
North Newington	Oxfordshire	52.04°N 01.38°W	SP4239
North Newnton	Wiltshire	51.31°N 01.82°W	SU1257
North Newton	Somerset	51.07°N 03.00°W	ST3031
Northney	Hampshire	50.82°N 00.96°W	SU7303
North Nibley	Gloucestershire	51.65°N 02.39°W	ST7395
North Oakley	Hampshire	51.28°N 01.24°W	SU5354
North Ockendon	Havering	51.54°N 00.29°E	TQ5985
Northolt	Ealing	51.54°N 00.37°W	TQ1384
Northop (Llaneurgain)	Flintshire	53.20°N 03.13°W	SJ2468
Northop Hall	Flintshire	53.19°N 03.09°W	SJ2767
North Ormesby	Middlesbrough	54.56°N 01.21°W	NZ5119
North Ormsby	Lincolnshire	53.41°N 00.07°W	TF2893
Northorpe (West Lindsey)	Lincolnshire	53.46°N 00.66°W	SK8997
Northorpe (Donington)	Lincolnshire	52.90°N 00.21°W	TF2036
Northorpe (South Kesteven)	Lincolnshire	52.73°N 00.38°W	TF0917
Northorpe	Kirklees	53.67°N 01.68°W	SE2120
North Otterington	North Yorkshire	54.30°N 01.44°W	SE3689
Northover (Ilchester)	Somerset	51.00°N 02.68°W	ST5223
Northover (Glastonbury)	Somerset	51.13°N 02.74°W	ST4838
North Owersby	Lincolnshire	53.43°N 00.40°W	TF0694
Northowram	Calderdale	53.73°N 01.83°W	SE1126
North Perrott	Somerset	50.87°N 02.75°W	ST4709
North Petherton	Somerset	51.09°N 03.01°W	ST2933
North Petherwin	Cornwall	50.67°N 04.43°W	SX2889
North Pickenham	Norfolk	52.62°N 00.74°E	TF8606
North Piddle	Worcestershire	52.18°N 02.05°W	SO9654
North Poorton	Dorset	50.77°N 02.69°W	SY5198
Northport	Dorset	50.69°N 02.11°W	SY9288
North Poulner	Hampshire	50.85°N 01.77°W	SU1606
Northpunds	Shetland Islands	59.98°N 01.28°W	HU4022
North Queensferry	Fife	56.00°N 03.39°W	NT1380
North Radworthy	Devon	51.09°N 03.78°W	SS7534
North Rauceby	Lincolnshire	53.00°N 00.48°W	TF0246
North Rayne	Aberdeenshire	57.36°N 02.53°W	NJ6831
North Reddish	Stockport	53.44°N 02.16°W	SJ8994
Northrepps	Norfolk	52.90°N 01.32°E	TG2439
North Reston	Lincolnshire	53.32°N 00.07°E	TF3883
North Rigton	North Yorkshire	53.93°N 01.59°W	SE2749
North Ripley	Hampshire	50.79°N 01.77°W	SZ1699
North Rode	Cheshire	53.19°N 02.18°W	SJ8866
North Roe	Shetland Islands	60.58°N 01.34°W	HU3689
North Ronaldsay	Orkney Islands	59.37°N 02.42°W	HY760541
North Row	Cumbria	54.67°N 03.21°W	NY2232
North Runcton	Norfolk	52.70°N 00.42°E	TF6415
North Scale	Cumbria	54.11°N 03.25°W	SD1870
North Scarle	Lincolnshire	53.18°N 00.74°W	SK8466
North Seaton	Northumberland	55.16°N 01.54°W	NZ2986
North Seaton Colliery	Northumberland	55.15°N 01.54°W	NZ2985
North Sheen	Richmond Upon Thames	51.47°N 00.28°W	TQ1976
North Shian	Argyll and Bute	56.53°N 05.40°W	NM9143
North Shields	North Tyneside	55.00°N 01.45°W	NZ3568
North Shoebury	Essex	51.54°N 00.76°E	TQ9286
North Shore	Lancashire	53.83°N 03.06°W	SD3038
North Side	Cambridgeshire	52.57°N 00.12°W	TL2799
Northside	Orkney Islands	59.13°N 03.31°W	HY2528
North Side	Cumbria	54.64°N 03.55°W	NY0029
North Skelton	Redcar and Cleveland	54.55°N 00.96°W	NZ6718
North Skerry	Shetland Islands	60.37°N 01.81°W	HU103653
North Somercotes	Lincolnshire	53.44°N 00.13°E	TF4296
North Stainley	North Yorkshire	54.17°N 01.57°W	SE2876
North Stainmore	Cumbria	54.53°N 02.26°W	NY8315
North Star	Devon	50.65°N 03.30°W	SY0885
North Stifford	Essex	51.49°N 00.30°E	TQ6080
North Stoke	West Sussex	50.88°N 00.55°W	TQ0210
North Stoke	Oxfordshire	51.56°N 01.12°W	SU6186
North Stoke	Bath and North East Somerset	51.41°N 02.43°W	ST7069
North Stoneham	Hampshire	50.95°N 01.38°W	SU4317
North Street (Ropley)	Hampshire	51.09°N 01.08°W	SU6433
North Street (Breamore)	Hampshire	50.96°N 01.78°W	SU1518
North Street	Berkshire	51.44°N 01.09°W	SU6372
North Street (Sheldwich)	Kent	51.28°N 00.88°E	TR0158
North Street (Hoo St Werburgh)	Kent	51.43°N 00.60°E	TQ8174
North Sunderland	Northumberland	55.57°N 01.66°W	NU2131
North Synton	Scottish Borders	55.49°N 02.82°W	NT4823

=== North T – North W ===
Location	Locality	Coordinates (links to map & photo sources)	OS grid reference
North Tamerton	Cornwall	50.74°N 04.39°W	SX3197
North Tawton	Devon	50.79°N 03.90°W	SS6601
North Thoresby	Lincolnshire	53.46°N 00.05°W	TF2998
North Tidworth	Wiltshire	51.23°N 01.67°W	SU2348
North Togston	Northumberland	55.31°N 01.60°W	NU2502
Northton	Western Isles	57.78°N 07.06°W	NF9989
North Town	Hampshire	51.24°N 00.75°W	SU8750
North Town (North Wootton)	Somerset	51.17°N 02.63°W	ST5642
North Town (North Cadbury)	Somerset	51.05°N 02.52°W	ST6328
North Town	Devon	50.86°N 04.11°W	SS5109
North Town	Berkshire	51.53°N 00.73°W	SU8882
North Town	Shetland Islands	59.89°N 01.30°W	HU3912
Northtown	Orkney Islands	58.85°N 02.92°W	ND4797
North Tuddenham	Norfolk	52.67°N 01.01°E	TG0413
North Uist	Western Isles	57.59°N 07.37°W	NF793689
Northumberland Heath	Bexley	51.47°N 00.15°E	TQ5077
Northville	Torfaen	51.65°N 03.02°W	ST2996
North Walbottle	Newcastle upon Tyne	54.99°N 01.73°W	NZ1767
North Walney	Cumbria	54.11°N 03.27°W	SD1769
North Walsham	Norfolk	52.81°N 01.38°E	TG2830
North Waltham	Hampshire	51.21°N 01.19°W	SU5646
North Wamses	Northumberland	55.63°N 01.64°W	NU225380
Northward	Isles of Scilly	49.95°N 06.33°W	SV8915
North Warnborough	Hampshire	51.25°N 00.95°W	SU7351
North Water Bridge	Angus	56.78°N 02.57°W	NO6566
North Waterhayne	Devon	50.86°N 03.06°W	ST2508
North Watford	Hertfordshire	51.67°N 00.41°W	TQ1098
Northway	Somerset	51.05°N 03.24°W	ST1329
Northway	Devon	50.98°N 04.30°W	SS3823
Northway	Gloucestershire	51.99°N 02.11°W	SO9233
Northway	Swansea	51.58°N 04.05°W	SS5889
North Weald Bassett	Essex	51.71°N 00.15°E	TL4904
North Weirs	Hampshire	50.81°N 01.60°W	SU2802
North Wembley	Brent	51.56°N 00.31°W	TQ1786
North Weston	Oxfordshire	51.73°N 01.01°W	SP6805
North Weston	North Somerset	51.47°N 02.77°W	ST4675
North West Point	Devon	51.19°N 04.67°W	SS134476
North Wheatley	Nottinghamshire	53.35°N 00.87°W	SK7585
North Whilborough	Devon	50.48°N 03.59°W	SX8766
Northwich	Cheshire	53.25°N 02.52°W	SJ6573
Northwick	Worcestershire	52.21°N 02.23°W	SO8457
Northwick	Somerset	51.22°N 02.93°W	ST3548
Northwick	South Gloucestershire	51.57°N 02.63°W	ST5686
North Wick	Bath and North East Somerset	51.38°N 02.60°W	ST5865
North Widcombe	Bath and North East Somerset	51.31°N 02.61°W	ST5758
North Willingham	Lincolnshire	53.37°N 00.25°W	TF1688
North Wingfield	Derbyshire	53.18°N 01.38°W	SK4165
North Witham	Lincolnshire	52.77°N 00.63°W	SK9221
Northwold	Norfolk	52.54°N 00.57°E	TL7597
Northwood	Derbyshire	53.17°N 01.61°W	SK2664
Northwood	Hillingdon	51.60°N 00.42°W	TQ0991
Northwood	Isle of Wight	50.73°N 01.32°W	SZ4893
Northwood	Kent	51.35°N 01.40°E	TR3767
Northwood	Knowsley	53.48°N 02.87°W	SJ4299
Northwood	Shropshire	52.89°N 02.80°W	SJ4633
Northwood	Staffordshire	52.97°N 02.22°W	SJ8542
Northwood	City of Stoke-on-Trent	53.02°N 02.16°W	SJ8948
Northwood Green	Gloucestershire	51.84°N 02.42°W	SO7116
Northwood Hills	Hillingdon	51.59°N 00.42°W	TQ0990
North Woolwich	Greenwich	51.49°N 00.05°E	TQ4379
North Wootton	Somerset	51.16°N 02.63°W	ST5641
North Wootton	Dorset	50.92°N 02.49°W	ST6514
North Wootton	Norfolk	52.78°N 00.43°E	TF6424
North Wraxall	Wiltshire	51.47°N 02.27°W	ST8175
North Wroughton	Swindon	51.52°N 01.79°W	SU1481

=== Norton – Norwood ===
Location	Locality	Coordinates (links to map & photo sources)	OS grid reference
Norton (Torridge)	Devon	50.99°N 04.48°W	SS2625
Norton (South Hams)	Devon	50.34°N 03.61°W	SX8551
Norton	Doncaster	53.62°N 01.18°W	SE5415
Norton	Dudley	52.43°N 02.16°W	SO8982
Norton	East Sussex	50.79°N 00.08°E	TQ4701
Norton	Gloucestershire	51.91°N 02.21°W	SO8524
Norton	Hertfordshire	51.99°N 00.20°W	TL2334
Norton	Isle of Wight	50.69°N 01.51°W	SZ3489
Norton	Monmouthshire	51.87°N 02.81°W	SO4420
Norton	Northamptonshire	52.26°N 01.12°W	SP6063
Norton	North Somerset	51.36°N 02.94°W	ST3463
Norton	Nottinghamshire	53.24°N 01.14°W	SK5772
Norton	Powys	52.29°N 03.02°W	SO3067
Norton	Sheffield	53.33°N 01.47°W	SK3582
Norton (Culmington)	Shropshire	52.42°N 02.79°W	SO4681
Norton (Wroxeter and Uppington)	Shropshire	52.67°N 02.65°W	SJ5609
Norton (Stockton)	Shropshire	52.59°N 02.41°W	SJ7200
Norton	Stockton-on-Tees	54.58°N 01.32°W	NZ4421
Norton	Suffolk	52.24°N 00.85°E	TL9565
Norton (Penrice)	Swansea	51.55°N 04.17°W	SS4986
Norton (Mumbles)	Swansea	51.57°N 04.00°W	SS6188
Norton (Arun)	West Sussex	50.84°N 00.69°W	SU9206
Norton (Chichester)	West Sussex	50.74°N 00.78°W	SZ8695
Norton	Wiltshire	51.55°N 02.17°W	ST8884
Norton (near Evesham)	Worcestershire	52.12°N 01.95°W	SP0347
Norton (near Worcester)	Worcestershire	52.14°N 02.17°W	SO8850
Norton Ash	Kent	51.31°N 00.82°E	TQ9761
Norton Bavant	Wiltshire	51.18°N 02.14°W	ST9043
Norton Bridge	Staffordshire	52.86°N 02.19°W	SJ8730
Norton Canes	Staffordshire	52.66°N 01.98°W	SK0107
Norton Canon	Herefordshire	52.11°N 02.90°W	SO3847
Norton Corner	Norfolk	52.80°N 01.09°E	TG0928
Norton Disney	Lincolnshire	53.12°N 00.68°W	SK8859
Norton East	Staffordshire	52.67°N 01.97°W	SK0208
Norton Ferris	Wiltshire	51.12°N 02.30°W	ST7936
Norton Fitzwarren	Somerset	51.01°N 03.15°W	ST1925
Norton Green	Hertfordshire	51.89°N 00.22°W	TL2223
Norton Green	Isle of Wight	50.69°N 01.51°W	SZ3488
Norton Green	Solihull	52.36°N 01.75°W	SP1774
Norton Green	City of Stoke-on-Trent	53.06°N 02.15°W	SJ9052
Norton Hawkfield	Bath and North East Somerset	51.37°N 02.59°W	ST5964
Norton Heath	Essex	51.71°N 00.31°E	TL6004
Norton Hill	Somerset	51.27°N 02.47°W	ST6753
Norton in Hales	Shropshire	52.93°N 02.44°W	SJ7038
Norton-in-the-Moors	City of Stoke-on-Trent	53.05°N 02.16°W	SJ8951
Norton-juxta-Twycross	Leicestershire	52.65°N 01.52°W	SK3206
Norton-le-Clay	North Yorkshire	54.13°N 01.38°W	SE4071
Norton Lees	Sheffield	53.35°N 01.47°W	SK3584
Norton Lindsey	Warwickshire	52.26°N 01.67°W	SP2263
Norton Little Green	Suffolk	52.25°N 00.88°E	TL9766
Norton Malreward	Bath and North East Somerset	51.38°N 02.57°W	ST6065
Norton Mandeville	Essex	51.71°N 00.28°E	TL5804
Norton-on-Derwent	North Yorkshire	54.12°N 00.79°W	SE7971
Norton St Philip	Somerset	51.29°N 02.33°W	ST7755
Norton Subcourse	Norfolk	52.52°N 01.55°E	TM4198
Norton Sub Hamdon	Somerset	50.93°N 02.75°W	ST4715
Norton's Wood	North Somerset	51.44°N 02.82°W	ST4372
Norton Woodseats	Sheffield	53.33°N 01.47°W	SK3582
Norwell	Nottinghamshire	53.14°N 00.85°W	SK7761
Norwell Woodhouse	Nottinghamshire	53.15°N 00.89°W	SK7462
Norwich	Norfolk	52.62°N 01.29°E	TG2308
Norwick	Shetland Islands	60.80°N 00.80°W	HP6514
Norwood	Dorset	50.84°N 02.66°W	ST5305
Norwood	Derbyshire	53.32°N 01.31°W	SK4681
Norwood End	Essex	51.74°N 00.25°E	TL5608
Norwood Green	Calderdale	53.73°N 01.80°W	SE1326
Norwood Green	Hounslow	51.48°N 00.37°W	TQ1378
Norwood Hill	Surrey	51.17°N 00.22°W	TQ2443
Norwood New Town	Croydon	51.41°N 00.10°W	TQ3270
Norwoodside	Cambridgeshire	52.56°N 00.07°E	TL4198

=== Nos – Noy ===
Location	Locality	Coordinates (links to map & photo sources)	OS grid reference
Noseley	Leicestershire	52.57°N 00.92°W	SP7398
Noss	Shetland Islands	59.92°N 01.37°W	HU3516
Noss	Highland	58.47°N 03.08°W	ND3754
Noss Head	Highland	58.47°N 03.06°W	ND382547
Noss Mayo	Devon	50.30°N 04.05°W	SX5447
Nosterfield	North Yorkshire	54.21°N 01.58°W	SE2780
Nosterfield End	Cambridgeshire	52.07°N 00.37°E	TL6344
Nostie	Highland	57.28°N 05.56°W	NG8527
Notgrove	Gloucestershire	51.87°N 01.85°W	SP1020
Nottage	Bridgend	51.48°N 03.71°W	SS8178
Notter	Cornwall	50.41°N 04.26°W	SX3960
Nottingham	Nottingham	52.96°N 01.16°W	SK5641
Notting Hill	Royal Borough of Kensington and Chelsea	51.50°N 00.21°W	TQ2480
Nottington	Dorset	50.63°N 02.48°W	SY6682
Notton	Wakefield	53.61°N 01.47°W	SE3513
Notton	Wiltshire	51.42°N 02.13°W	ST9169
Nounsley	Essex	51.76°N 00.59°E	TL7910
Noup Head	Orkney Islands	59.32°N 03.06°W	HY396495
Noutard's Green	Worcestershire	52.29°N 02.30°W	SO7966
Nova Scotia	Cheshire	53.20°N 02.58°W	SJ6168
Novers Park	City of Bristol	51.41°N 02.60°W	ST5869
Noverton	Gloucestershire	51.90°N 02.04°W	SO9723
Nowton	Suffolk	52.20°N 00.72°E	TL8660
Nox	Shropshire	52.68°N 02.87°W	SJ4110
Noyadd Trefawr	Ceredigion	52.08°N 04.55°W	SN2546
Noyadd Wilym	Ceredigion	52.06°N 04.62°W	SN2044

== Nu ==
Location	Locality	Coordinates (links to map & photo sources)	OS grid reference
Nuffield	Oxfordshire	51.57°N 01.04°W	SU6687
Nun Appleton	North Yorkshire	53.84°N 01.16°W	SE5539
Nunburnholme	East Riding of Yorkshire	53.92°N 00.70°W	SE8548
Nuncargate	Nottinghamshire	53.08°N 01.25°W	SK5054
Nunclose	Cumbria	54.79°N 02.79°W	NY4945
Nuneaton	Warwickshire	52.51°N 01.47°W	SP3691
Nuneham Courtenay	Oxfordshire	51.68°N 01.20°W	SU5599
Nuney Green	Oxfordshire	51.50°N 01.03°W	SU6779
Nunhead	Southwark	51.45°N 00.05°W	TQ3575
Nun Hills	Lancashire	53.68°N 02.22°W	SD8521
Nunholm	Dumfries and Galloway	55.07°N 03.61°W	NX9777
Nunkeeling	East Riding of Yorkshire	53.93°N 00.26°W	TA1449
Nun Monkton	North Yorkshire	54.00°N 01.23°W	SE5057
Nunney	Somerset	51.20°N 02.38°W	ST7345
Nunney Catch	Somerset	51.19°N 02.38°W	ST7344
Nunnington	North Yorkshire	54.20°N 00.98°W	SE6679
Nunnykirk	Northumberland	55.22°N 01.87°W	NZ0892
Nunsthorpe	North East Lincolnshire	53.54°N 00.11°W	TA2507
Nunthorpe	Middlesbrough	54.51°N 01.18°W	NZ5314
Nunthorpe	York	53.93°N 01.10°W	SE5949
Nunton	Wiltshire	51.03°N 01.78°W	SU1526
Nunwick	North Yorkshire	54.16°N 01.51°W	SE3274
Nupdown	South Gloucestershire	51.65°N 02.53°W	ST6395
Nup End	Buckinghamshire	51.86°N 00.75°W	SP8619
Nup End	Hertfordshire	51.85°N 00.22°W	TL2219
Nupend (Horsley)	Gloucestershire	51.68°N 02.24°W	ST8398
Nupend (Eastington)	Gloucestershire	51.75°N 02.32°W	SO7806
Nuper's Hatch	Essex	51.62°N 00.18°E	TQ5194
Nuppend	Gloucestershire	51.70°N 02.58°W	SO6001
Nuptown	Berkshire	51.44°N 00.73°W	SU8873
Nursling	Hampshire	50.94°N 01.47°W	SU3716
Nursted	Hampshire	50.98°N 00.91°W	SU7621
Nursteed	Wiltshire	51.33°N 01.97°W	SU0260
Nurston	The Vale Of Glamorgan	51.39°N 03.36°W	ST0567
Nurton	Staffordshire	52.58°N 02.25°W	SO8399
Nurton Hill	Staffordshire	52.58°N 02.25°W	SO8399
Nutbourne (Chichester)	West Sussex	50.83°N 00.89°W	SU7805
Nutbourne (Horsham)	West Sussex	50.95°N 00.47°W	TQ0718
Nutbourne Common	West Sussex	50.95°N 00.47°W	TQ0718
Nutburn	Hampshire	50.97°N 01.44°W	SU3920
Nutcombe	Surrey	51.09°N 00.74°W	SU8834
Nutfield	Surrey	51.23°N 00.13°W	TQ3050
Nut Grove	St Helens	53.42°N 02.76°W	SJ4992
Nuthall	Nottinghamshire	52.99°N 01.24°W	SK5144
Nuthampstead	Hertfordshire	51.98°N 00.03°E	TL4034
Nuthurst	West Sussex	51.02°N 00.30°W	TQ1926
Nuthurst	Warwickshire	52.33°N 01.78°W	SP1571
Nutley	Hampshire	51.19°N 01.14°W	SU6044
Nutley	East Sussex	51.02°N 00.05°E	TQ4427
Nuttall	Bury	53.63°N 02.31°W	SD7915
Nutwell	Doncaster	53.52°N 01.05°W	SE6304

== Ny ==
Location	Locality	Coordinates (links to map & photo sources)	OS grid reference
Nybster	Highland	58.55°N 03.10°W	ND3663
Nye	North Somerset	51.34°N 02.84°W	ST4161
Nyetimber	West Sussex	50.77°N 00.73°W	SZ8998
Nyewood	West Sussex	50.98°N 00.86°W	SU8021
Nyland	Somerset	51.24°N 02.78°W	ST4550
Nymet Rowland	Devon	50.85°N 03.83°W	SS7108
Nymet Tracey	Devon	50.78°N 03.81°W	SS7200
Nympsfield	Gloucestershire	51.69°N 02.29°W	SO8000
Nynehead	Somerset	50.99°N 03.24°W	ST1322
Nythe	Somerset	51.10°N 02.82°W	ST4234
Nythe	Swindon	51.56°N 01.74°W	SU1885
Nyton	West Sussex	50.83°N 00.68°W	SU9305
