= Norton =

Norton may refer to:

== Places ==
Norton, meaning 'north settlement' in Old English, is a common place name. Places named Norton include:

=== Canada ===
- Rural Municipality of Norton No. 69, Saskatchewan
- Norton Parish, New Brunswick
  - Norton, New Brunswick, a village

=== United Kingdom ===
==== England ====
- Norton, Runcorn, Cheshire, a district
- Norton, South Hams, a location in Devon
- Norton, Torridge, a location in Devon
- Norton, County Durham, an area of Stockton-on-Tees
- Norton, East Sussex, a location
- Norton, Gloucestershire, a civil parish
- Norton, Hampshire, a hamlet near Sutton Scotney
- Norton, Herefordshire, a civil parish near Bromyard
- Norton, Hertfordshire, a village
- Norton, Isle of Wight, a location
- Norton, Buckland and Stone, Kent, a civil parish
- Norton, Northamptonshire, a village
- Norton, Nottinghamshire, a village
- Norton, Culmington, a location in Shropshire
- Norton, Stockton, Shropshire, a location in Shropshire
- Norton, Wroxeter and Uppington, a location in Shropshire
- Norton, Somerset, a location
- Norton, Doncaster, South Yorkshire, a civil parish
- Norton, Sheffield, South Yorkshire, a district
- Norton, Suffolk, a village
- Norton, Dudley, West Midlands, a suburb and council ward in the town of Stourbridge
- Norton, Arun, a location in West Sussex
- Norton, Chichester, a location in West Sussex
- Norton, Wiltshire, a civil parish
- Norton, Worcestershire, a village near Worcester
- Norton, East Worcestershire, a location near Evesham, Worcestershire
- Norton-on-Derwent, a town in North Yorkshire
- Norton Camp, a Bronze Age hill fort in Somerset
- Norton Rural District (Yorkshire), a former local government area
- Blo' Norton, Norfolk

==== Wales ====
- Norton, Monmouthshire, a location
- Norton, Powys, a village
- Norton, Swansea, a settlement in Mumbles
- Norton, Penrice, a location in Swansea

=== United States ===
- Norton, Arizona, a populated place
- Norton County, Kansas
  - Norton, Kansas, a city and the county seat
- Nortonville, Kentucky, originally established as Norton
- Norton, Massachusetts, a town
- Norton, Missouri, an unincorporated community
- Norton, New Jersey, an unincorporated community
- Norton, Ohio, a city
- Norton, Texas, an unincorporated community
- Norton, Vermont, a town
- Norton, Virginia, a city
- Norton, West Virginia, an unincorporated community
- Norton, Wisconsin, an unincorporated community
- Norton Air Force Base, California
- Norton Bay, Alaska
- Norton Reservoir, Massachusetts
- Norton Sound, Alaska, an inlet of the Bering Sea
- Norton Township (disambiguation)

=== Elsewhere ===
- Norton, Sri Lanka, a village
- Norton, Zimbabwe, a town
- Norton Street, Leichhardt, Sydney, New South Wales, Australia
- Norton Summit, South Australia, in the Adelaide Hills

== People and fictional characters ==
- Norton (given name)
- Norton (surname)

== Music ==
- Norton (band), indie rock band from Portugal
- Norton Records, a record label

== Brands and enterprises ==
- Norton (Symantec), the computer security division of Symantec
- Norton Abrasives
- Norton Healthcare, a healthcare system in Louisville, Kentucky
- Norton Motorcycle Company, a British motorcycle manufacturer
- W. W. Norton & Company, an American book publishing corporation

== Titles ==
- Baron Norton, a title in the Peerage of the United Kingdom
- Norton baronets, four titles, all extinct

== Other uses ==
- Norton (grape), a variety of grape also known as Cynthiana
- Norton tradition, an archaeological culture from the North American Arctic
- Norton's theorem in electronics
- Norton's Star Atlas, a set of 16 celestial charts
- Norton Building, in Los Angeles, California

== See also ==
- Naughton
- Norton House (disambiguation), various buildings
- Norton Conyers, a civil parish in North Yorkshire
- Norton, Cuckney, Holbeck and Welbeck, a civil parish in Nottinghamshire
- Norton in Hales, a village and parish in Shropshire
- Norton-in-the-Moors, an area of Stoke-on-Trent, Staffordshire
- Norton Juxta Twycross, a village in Leicestershire
- Norton-le-Clay, a village and parish in North Yorkshire
- Norton-on-Derwent, a town and parish in North Yorkshire
- Norton St Philip, a civil parish in Somerset
- Norton-sub-Hamdon, Somerset, a civil parish
- Nortonville (disambiguation)
