= Northwood =

Northwood may refer to:

== Places ==
=== Australia ===
- Northwood, New South Wales
- Northwood, Victoria

=== Canada ===
- Northwood, Thunder Bay, Ontario, a neighbourhood in the city of Thunder Bay

=== United Kingdom ===
- Northwood, Derbyshire, a settlement in Northwood and Tinkersley civil parish
- Northwood, Isle of Wight
- Northwood, Kent, Ramsgate, Thanet, Kent
- Northwood, London, in the London Borough of Hillingdon
- Northwood, Merseyside, a district of Kirkby, Merseyside
- Northwood, Shropshire, a location in the U.K.
- Northwood, Stafford, a location in the U.K.
- Northwood, Stoke-on-Trent, Staffordshire
- Northwood Headquarters, Eastbury, Hertfordshire
- North Hayling, Hampshire, formerly called "Northwood"
- Great North Wood a former natural oak woodland located in what is now south London.

=== United States ===
- Northwood, Irvine, California
- Northwood, Delaware, a place in Delaware
- Northwood, Iowa
- Northwood, Baltimore, Maryland
- Northwood, New Hampshire
- Northwood, North Dakota
- Northwood, Ohio, in Wood County
- Northwood, Logan County, Ohio
- Northwood, Philadelphia, Pennsylvania, a Northeast Philadelphia neighborhood

== Education ==
- Northwood High School (disambiguation), multiple schools
- Northwood School (disambiguation), multiple schools
- Northwood College, a girls' school in Northwood, London
- Northwood University, a private university with locations in many U.S. states

== Other uses ==
- Northwood Space, American space company
- Northwood (TV series), drama series that ran on Canadian Broadcasting Corporation
- Joseph Northwood (1809–1886), Canadian businessman and politician
- Intel Northwood, a revised version of the Pentium 4 'Netburst' CPU core introduced in 2002

== See also ==
- North Woods (disambiguation)
- Norwood (disambiguation)
