= Northleigh (disambiguation) =

Northleigh is a village and civil parish in East Devon, Devon, England.

Northleigh may also refer to:

== People ==
- Henry Northleigh (1643–1694), Member of Parliament for Okehampton
- John Northleigh (1657–1705), English physician
- Stephen Northleigh, 18th-century Member of Parliament for Totnes

== Places ==
- Northleigh, Alberta, Canada
- Northleigh, North Devon, a location close to Goodleigh, Devon, England

== See also ==
- North Leigh, Oxfordshire, England
- North Leigh F.C.
