= List of shipwrecks in July 1884 =

The list of shipwrecks in July 1884 includes ships sunk, foundered, grounded, or otherwise lost during July 1884.

== 1 July ==
List of shipwrecks: 1 July 1884
Ship	State	Description
British India	United Kingdom	The barque was driven ashore at the South Foreland, Kent. She was on a voyage from Hamburg, Germany to Valparaíso, Chile. She was refloated and taken in to Dover, Kent.
Cornishman	United Kingdom	The steamship was driven ashore at Barber's Point, Ottoman Empire. She was on a voyage from Cardiff, Glamorgan to Odesa, Russia. She was refloated with the assistance of a tug.
Gamma	United Kingdom	The schooner struck rocks at Ryhope, County Durham. She was on a voyage from King's Lynn, Norfolk to the River Tyne. She was refloated and assisted in to Seaham, County Durham in a leaky condition.
Ligera	Spanish Navy	The Covadonga-class gunboat suffered a boiler explosion and foundered off Nuevitas, Cuba with the loss of three of her crew.
Portugal	Norway	The steamship ran aground on the Goodwin Sands, Kent.

== 2 July ==
List of shipwrecks: 2 July 1884
Ship	State	Description
Palala	United Kingdom	The barque was wrecked at False Cape, India with the loss of all but three of her crew. She was on a voyage from Bassein, India to Bremen, Germany.

== 3 July ==
List of shipwrecks: 3 July 1884
Ship	State	Description
Dunmurray	United Kingdom	The steamship collided with Nordstjernen (Norway) in the River Thames near Gravesend, Kent and was severely damaged.
John Bladworth	United Kingdom	The steamship ran aground in the River Ouse 1 nautical mile (1.9 km) downstream of Goole, Yorkshire. She was on a voyage from Goole to Antwerp, Belgium.
Scottish Maid	United Kingdom	The tug was driven ashore and wrecked at South Shields, County Durham. Her crew were rescued.
Water Lily	United Kingdom	The schooner struck rocks 2 nautical miles (3.7 km) east of Tarifa, Spain. She was beached and abandoned by her crew.

== 4 July ==
List of shipwrecks: 4 July 1884
Ship	State	Description
Lord Alfred Paget	United Kingdom	The steamship was driven ashore in Robin Hoods Bay.

== 5 July ==
List of shipwrecks: 5 July 1884
Ship	State	Description
Mignonette	United Kingdom	The yacht was abandoned, sinking, in the Atlantic Ocean 1,600 nautical miles (3,000 km) north west of the Cape of Good Hope, Cape Colony after being damaged in a gale. Her four crew took to a lifeboat, but one of them was killed to provide food for the other three on 25 July. The survivors were rescued by the barque Montezuma or Moctezuma (Germany) on 29 July. Mignonette was on a voyage from Southampton, Hampshire to Sydney, New South Wales.

== 6 July ==
List of shipwrecks: 6 July 1884
Ship	State	Description
Camoens	United Kingdom	The steamship ran aground at "Brimsness". She was on a voyage from Leith, Lothian to Iceland.
Valdivia	United Kingdom	The ship ran ashore and was wrecked at Point Carquin, 2 nautical miles (3.7 km) north of Huacho, Peru with the loss of three lives.

== 7 July ==
List of shipwrecks: 7 July 1884
Ship	State	Description
H. C. Colman	United States	The steamship suffered a boiler explosion and sank with the loss of a crew member .
Telefon	Norway	The full-rigged ship was driven ashore at Lossiemouth, Moray, United Kingdom. She was on a voyage from the Gulf of Bothnia to Lossiemouth.

== 9 July ==
List of shipwrecks: 9 July 1884
Ship	State	Description
Ahnapee	United States	The schooner ran aground at North Point in Sheboygan, Wisconsin (43°47.110′N 087°42.635′W). All six of her crew were rescued by United States Life-Saving Service personnel. Ahnapee became a total loss. She was on a voyage from Torch Lake, Michigan to Chicago, Illinois, or Milwaukee, Wisconsin.
Dart	United Kingdom	The ketch foundered off Hartlepool, County Durham. Her crew survived. She was on a voyage from Sunderland, County Durham to Stockholm, Sweden.
Marie Ange	United Kingdom	The ship was sighted whilst on a voyage from Newcastle, New South Wales to Port Chalmers, New Zealand. No further trace, reported missing.

== 10 July ==
List of shipwrecks: 10 July 1884
Ship	State	Description
Eastern Maid	United Kingdom	The ship was driven ashore at Pentewan, Cornwall.
Gravina	Spanish Navy	The Velasco-class unprotected cruiser and was wrecked on Fuga Island in the Babuyan Islands north of Luzon in the Spanish East Indies during a typhoon on 10 July 1884 with the loss of nine lives.
Windsor Castle	United Kingdom	The full-rigged ship was abandoned and set afire 35 nautical miles (65 km) off Algoa Bay. Her crew were rescued by the barque Ophir (Norway). Windsor Castle was on a voyage from Cochin, India to London.

== 11 July ==
List of shipwrecks: 11 July 1884
Ship	State	Description
Aislaby	United Kingdom	The steamship ran aground and sank off Cape Sagres, Portugal. Her crew were rescued by Trevose (United Kingdom). Aislaby was on a voyage from Taganrog, Russia to Hull, Yorkshire.
Fantaisie	United Kingdom	The ship was sighted off "Cape Seal" whilst on a voyage from Cochin, India to Bordeaux, Gironde, France. No further trace, reported missing.

== 14 July ==
List of shipwrecks: 14 July 1884
Ship	State	Description
Demerara	United Kingdom	The barque sprang a leak and foundered in the Atlantic Ocean. Her thirteen crew took to the boats; they reached Madeira on 17 July. She was on a voyage from Newport, Monmouthshire to Pará, Brazil.

== 15 July ==
List of shipwrecks: 15 July 1884
Ship	State	Description
Benedict	United Kingdom	The steamship sank near "Dahlsbruck". She was on a voyage from Middlesbrough, Yorkshire to "Dahlsbruck". She was refloated in early October.

== 17 July ==
List of shipwrecks: 17 July 1884
Ship	State	Description
Caleb Eaton	United States	The whaling schooner was crushed in ice off the coast of the District of Alaska.
Cock Robin	United Kingdom	The yawl struck the pier at Shoreham-by-Sea, Sussex and sank. Her crew survived.
Jane Pringle	United Kingdom	The ship was driven ashore at Saint-Valery-sur-Somme, Somme, France. She was on a voyage from Dysart, Fife to Saint-Valery-sur-Somme.
Vicksburg	United Kingdom	The barque was wrecked on the Pentland Skerries with the loss of nine of her 21 crew.
W. M. Wood	United States	The tug capsized at Twelve-Mile Point below New Orleans, Louisiana, while trying to refloat the barque Bristol (Flag unknown). Three of her officers were killed.

== 19 July ==
List of shipwrecks: 19 July 1884
Ship	State	Description
Dordrecht II	Netherlands	The ship was wrecked off Cape Agulhas, Cape Colony. She was on a voyage from Java, Netherlands East Indies to Amsterdam, North Holland. She was towed in to Cape Town on 31 July by Tiger (Flag unknown).
Leverrier	United Kingdom	The steamship sprang a leak and foundered off Cape Spartel, Morocco. Her crew were rescued by the steamship International (United Kingdom). Leverrier was on a voyage from Liverpool, Lancashire to Bombay, India.

== 22 July ==
List of shipwrecks: 22 July 1884
Ship	State	Description
Criterion	United Kingdom	The schooner was wrecked on Skokholm Island, Pembrokeshire. Her crew were rescued.
Gijon, and Laxham	Spain; United Kingdom	The steamships collided off Cape Finisterre and both sank. About 80 people died from the 180 people on board Gijon, including her captain who shot himself. Gijon was on a voyage from A Coruña to Cuba. The steamship Santo Domingo (Spain) rescued 45 passengers from Gijon and eleven crew from Laxham. Fifteen passengers from Gijon were rescued by Zoe (United Kingdom); which also rescued two crew from Laxham. Nine crew from Gijon and four crew from Laxham were rescued by the steamsgip Ville de Valence (France). A further seven passengers and eight crew were rescued by Vespertina Wilson (Flag unknown). Sixteen passengers from Gijon were rescued by the schooner Nelson Hewitson (United Kingdom). A boat with fifteen survivors of Gijon landed at Muros. Laxham was on a voyage from Taganrog, Russia to Rotterdam, South Holland, Netherlands.
Heathpool	United Kingdom	The steamship was wrecked at Portsall, Finistère, France. Her crew were rescued. She was on a voyage from Sunderland, County Durham to Saint-Nazaire, Loire-Inférieure, France.
Huelva	United Kingdom	The steamship was driven ashore and wrecked at Cape Villano, Spain. Her crew survived. She was on a voyage from Newcastle upon Tyne, Northumberland to Lisbon, Portugal.
Madras	United Kingdom	The steamship was driven ashore and wrecked south of "Merqui", Burma.
Shaftesbury	United Kingdom	The steamship was wrecked on the Uxen Rocks, on the coast of Finisterre, Spain. Her crew were rescued. She was on a voyage from Sunderland to Cádiz, Spain.

== 24 July ==
List of shipwrecks: 24 July 1884
Ship	State	Description
Annie	United Kingdom	The steam launch collided with the tug Flying Kestrel (United Kingdom) and sank in the River Mersey. Her crew were rescued by Flying Kestrel.
Florence Nightingale	United Kingdom	The ship ran aground on the Frosat Rocks, on the Norwegian coast. She was on a voyage from Trondheim, Norway to Arkhangelsk, Russia.
J. M. Bowell	United States	The passenger ship capsized in a storm in the Monongahela River near Brownsville, Pennsylvania with the loss of one life.
Navarino	United Kingdom	The steamship put in to Portland, Dorset on fire. She was on a voyage from London, to Calcutta, India. The fire was extinguished with assistance from HMS Minotaur (Royal Navy).
Richard Owen	United Kingdom	The brig collided with the brigantine Belle Star (United Kingdom) and sank in the Atlantic Ocean (45°15′N 42°40′W) with the loss of four of her crew. Survivors were rescued by Belle Star. Richard Owen was on a voyage from Cádiz, Spain to Harbour Grace, Newfoundland Colony.
Sarah	United Kingdom	The steamship ran aground and was holed by her anchor at La Boca, Argentina.
Unnamed	Flag unknown	The schooner ran aground on the East Hoyle Bank, in Liverpool Bay. She was refloated with the assistance of a tug but consequently foundered. Her crew were rescued by the tug.

== 25 July ==
List of shipwrecks: 25 July 1884
Ship	State	Description
City of Chicago	United Kingdom	The steamship ran aground at Queenstown, County Cork. She was on a voyage from Liverpool, Lancashire to New York, United States. She was refloated and resumed her voyage.
St. Hilda	United Kingdom	The steam yacht ran aground on the Shingles, in the Solent. She was refloated and taken in to Cowes, Isle of Wight.

== 27 July ==
List of shipwrecks: 27 July 1884
Ship	State	Description
John M. Osborn	United States	The steamship was run into by the steamship Alberta ( Canada) and sank in Lake Superior six nautical miles (11 km) west north west of Whitefish Point, Michigan with the loss of three lives.
Nordcap	Norway	The steamship was run into by the steamship India (United Kingdom) and sank off the Goodwin Sands, Kent, United Kingdom. Her crew were rescued by India. Nordcap was on a voyage from Bergen to Barcelona, Spain.

== 29 July ==
List of shipwrecks: 29 July 1884
Ship	State	Description
Farningham	United Kingdom	The barque collided with the full-rigged ship Vanguard (United Kingdom) and sank at Brisbane, Queensland.
Unnamed	United Kingdom	The steamship was driven ashore near Cape Spartel, Morocco.

== 30 July ==
List of shipwrecks: 30 July 1884
Ship	State	Description
Amsterdam	Netherlands	The steamship was driven ashore on Cape Sable Island, Nova Scotia, Canada with the loss of four lives from her 212 passengers, plus her crew. She was on a voyage from Amsterdam, North Holland to a Canadian port.

== 31 July ==
List of shipwrecks: 31 July 1884
Ship	State	Description
Bellcairn	United Kingdom	The steamship collided with the steamship Britannia (United Kingdom) and sank in the English Channel off Portland, Dorset.
Gilsland	United Kingdom	The steamship ran aground at Port Errol, Aberdeenshire. She was on a voyage from South Shields, County Durham to Philadelphia, Pennsylvania, United States. She was refloated and put back to the River Tyne.
Laura	United Kingdom	The ketch ran aground on the Blackrock Ledge, off the Isle of Wight and sank. She was on a voyage from Portsmouth, Hampshire to Totland Bay. She was later refloated and beached at Norton, Isle of Wight.
Mary Ann	United Kingdom	The schooner was run into by the steamship Thomas Drydale (United Kingdom) and sank in the River Mersey. Her crew were rescued. Mary Ann was on a voyage from Dublin to Liverpool, Lancashire.

== Unknown date ==
List of shipwrecks: Unknown date in July 1884
Ship	State	Description
Albion	United Kingdom	The steamship was driven ashore at Newry, County Antrim.
Ardanbahn	United Kingdom	The steamship was driven ashore at Egersund, Norway. She was on a voyage from Grangemouth, Stirlingshire to Kronstadt, Russia. She was later refloated and taken in to Egersund.
Aros Bay	United Kingdom	The barque was lost whilst on a voyage from Dundee, Forfarshire to San Francisco, California. Her crew were rescued.
Bernard Hall	United Kingdom	The steamship was driven ashore in the Mississippi River.
Bore	Sweden	The brig was driven ashore on Læsø, Denmark. She was on a voyage from Oskarshamn to Hull, Yorkshire, United Kingdom. She was refloated and taken in to Gothenburg in a leaky condition.
Carl Emil	Denmark	The schooner was driven ashore on Inchgarvie, Lothian, United Kingdom. She was on a voyage from Grangemouth to Narva, Russia.
Colonsay	United Kingdom	The steamship was driven ashore in the Tusket Islands, Nova Scotia, Canada. She was on a voyage from Saint John, New Brunswick, Canada to Penarth, Glamorgan. She was refloated and taken in to Yarmouth, Nova Scotia in a leaky condition.
Dora	United Kingdom	The steamship was driven ashore at Souter Point, Northumberland. She was refloated and taken in to Sunderland, County Durham.
Enterprise	United Kingdom	The tug ran aground in the River Mersey.
Etta	United Kingdom	The brigantine capsized and sank whilst attempting to refloat the steamship SS Calvert1863 (2) (United States) at Port Antonio, Jamaica.
Etta Watt	United Kingdom	The schooner capsized and sank whilst attempting to refloat the steamship Calvert (United States) at Port Antonio.
Firth of Tay	United Kingdom	The ship ran aground at King's Lynn, Norfolk. She was refloated on 30 July and taken in to King's Lynn.
Fylgja	Norway	The ship was wrecked at Percé, Quebec, Canada. She was on a voyage from Pictou, Nova Scotia to Montreal, Quebec.
Georgian	United Kingdom	The steamship was driven ashore at Buffalo, New York.
Gulf of St. Vincent	United Kingdom	The steamship was driven ashore on Long Island, New York. She was on a voyage from Calcutta, India to New York City. She had been refloated by 20 July.
Hope Gower	United States	The schooner sank at Savanilla, United States of Colombia. Her crew were rescued. She was on a voyage from Barranquilla, United States of Colombia to Boston, Massachusetts.
Jeanie	United Kingdom	The steamship was driven ashore at Östergarn, Sweden. She was on a voyage from Kronstadt to London. She was refloated on 31 July and towed in to Slite, Sweden.
James Kenaway	United Kingdom	The ship was driven ashore at Port Ellen, Islay, Inner Hebrides. She was refloated on 22 July.
Kong Magnus	Norway	The steamship was driven ashore and wrecked at "Kindesnaes". She was on a voyage from Middlesbrough, Yorkshire to Christiania.
Léonie	Flag unknown	The schooner ran aground on the Barber Sands, in the North Sea off the coast of Suffolk, United Kingdom. She was refloated.
Lincoln City	United Kingdom	The ship was driven ashore on the coast of Nova Scotia before 7 July. She was refloated and taken in to Halifax, Nova Scotia.
Martin Scott	United Kingdom	The ship was driven ashore at Port Augusta, South Australia. She was later refloated.
Mediator	United Kingdom	The steamship was run into by Thuringia (Germany) and sank at Curaçao before 24 July. Her crew survived.
Nubienne	France	The yacht ran aground in the Hell Gate. She was refloated and taken in to New York City in a leaky condition.
Nuovo San Francisco	Greece	The ship was driven ashore at Cape Matapan. She was on a voyage from Galaţi, Romania to Bougie, Algeria. She was refloated and resumed her voyage, but put in to Malta on 24 July in a leaky condition.
River Avon	United Kingdom	The barque was driven ashore and wrecked on Boa Vista, Cape Verde Islands. Her crew were rescued. She was on a voyage from Newport, Monmouthshire to Talcahuano, Mexico.
River Ettrick	United Kingdom	The ship was driven ashore. She was on a voyage from Glace Bay, Nova Scotia to Montreal. She was refloated and towed in to Quebec City, Canada, where she arrived on 24 July.
Sarnia	United Kingdom	The steamship was driven ashore on Rathlin Island, County Antrim. Her passengers were taken off by a tug. She was on a voyage from Quebec City to Liverpool, Lancashire.
Valdivia	United Kingdom	The steamship was driven ashore and wrecked at Huacho, Peru.
William Turner	United Kingdom	The barque ran aground on the Brill Shoal. She was on a voyage from Manila, Spanish East Indies to Surabaya, Netherlands East Indies. She was refloated and taken in to Surabaya in a leaky condition.
