= Nup End =

Nup End may refer to:

- Nup End, Buckinghamshire, England
- Nup End, Hertfordshire, a United Kingdom location
