= Norton, California =

Norton, California may refer to:

- Norton Air Force Base, San Bernardino, California, U.S.

== See also ==
- Norton (disambiguation)
