= Nortonville =

Nortonville may refer to:

- Nortonville, California
- Nortonville, Kansas
- Nortonville, Kentucky

== See also ==
- Norton (disambiguation)
