= Norton House =

Norton House may refer to:

in England

- Norton House (Somerset), now-demolished Georgian mansion in Midsomer Norton, Somerset.

in United States

- Norton House (Yuma, Arizona), listed on the National Register of Historic Places (NRHP) in Yuma County
- Norton House (Branford, Connecticut), NRHP-listed in New Haven County
- Charles H. Norton House, Plainville, Connecticut, NRHP-listed
- Norton Fish Cabin at Captiva Rocks, Bokeelia, Florida, NRHP-listed
- Robert Lee Norton House, Cypress, Florida, NRHP-listed
- Gould Hyde Norton House, Eustis, Florida, NRHP-listed
- Norton House (West Palm Beach, Florida), NRHP-listed
- C. S. Norton Mansion, Bedford, Indiana, listed on the NRHP in Indiana
- Norton, Charles Henry and Charlotte, House, Avoca, Iowa, listed on the NRHP in Iowa
- Norton House Historic District, Falmouth, Maine, NRHP-listed
- William F. Norton House, Kingfield, Maine, NRHP-listed
- Norton House (Swansea, Massachusetts), NRHP-listed
- W. H. Norton House, Columbus, Montana, listed on the NRHP in Montana
- Rev. Asahel Norton Homestead, Kirkland, New York, NRHP-listed
- Clark-Norton House, Grants Pass, Oregon, listed on the NRHP in Oregon
- Norton-Orgain House, Salado, Texas, listed on the NRHP in Texas
- Pearl C. Norton House, Wauwatosa, Wisconsin, NRHP-listed in Milwaukee County
