= Norton Township =

Norton Township may refer to:

- Norton Township, Kankakee County, Illinois
- Norton Township, Jefferson County, Kansas
- Norton Township, Winona County, Minnesota
- Norton Township, Walsh County, North Dakota
- Norton Township, Summit County, Ohio
