= Auckengill =

Coordinates: 58.55924°N 3.08504°W

- Location within the Caithness area
- OS grid reference: ND369639
- Council area: Highland
- Country: Scotland
- Sovereign state: United Kingdom
- Post town: Wick
- Postcode district: KW14
- Police: Scotland
- Fire: Scottish
- Ambulance: Scottish
- UK Parliament: Caithness, Sutherland and Easter Ross
- Scottish Parliament: Caithness, Sutherland and Ross

Auckengill is a settlement within the Scottish council area of Highland, 6 miles (10 kilometres) south of John o' Groats, on the east coast of Caithness.

Auckengill is situated 1/2 mile (800 metres) north of Nybster.

== Museum ==
As Caithness is the Viking capital of mainland Scotland, Auckengill has a museum of Viking history called the Northlands Viking Centre. The museum examines the history of the Norse from Norway to Shetland, Orkney and Caithness. On display are models of the Viking settlement at Freswick and a Viking Longship. There is also a shop and picnic area. The museum is the site of the annual Scottish-Scandinavian Northlands Festival in September.

== Gallery ==
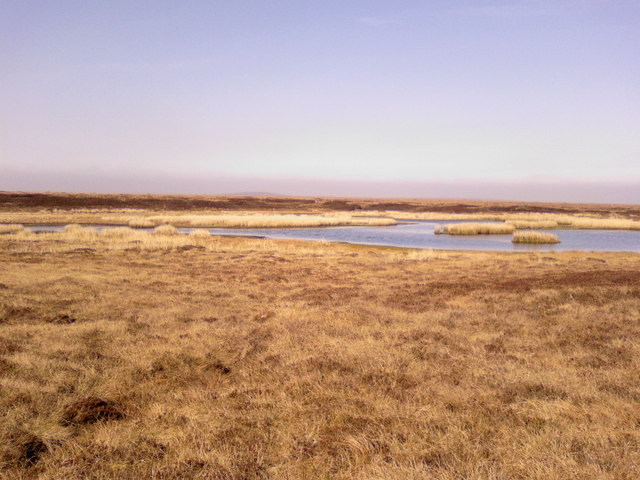
Loch in Auckengill.

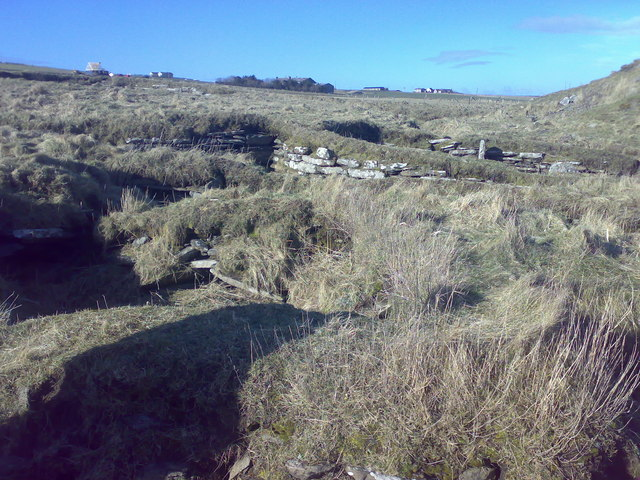
A broch in Auckengill.

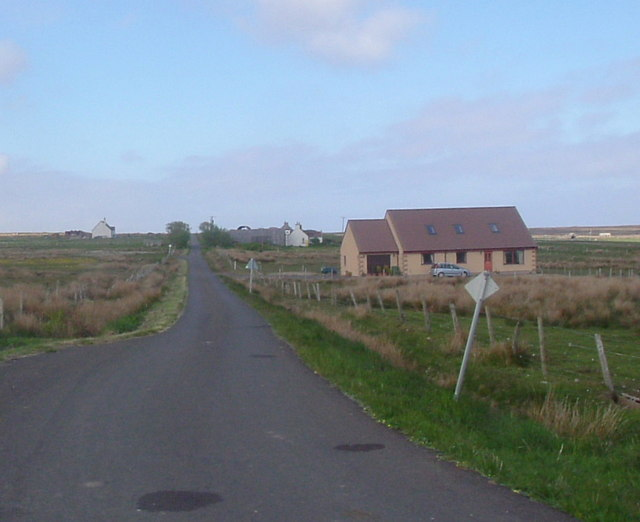
Main road of Auckengill.

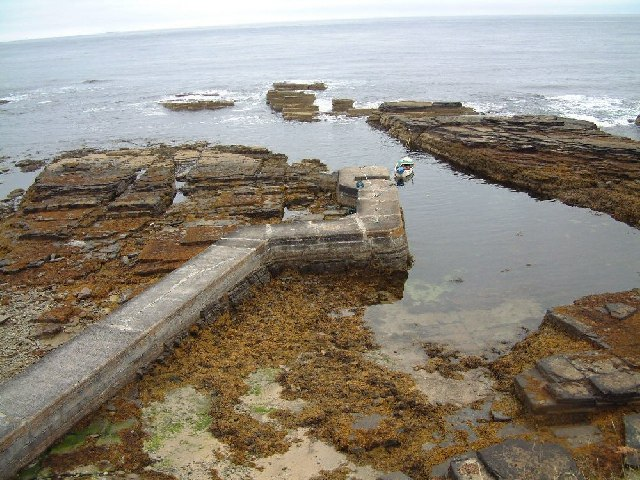
Auckengill Jetty with man made dock.

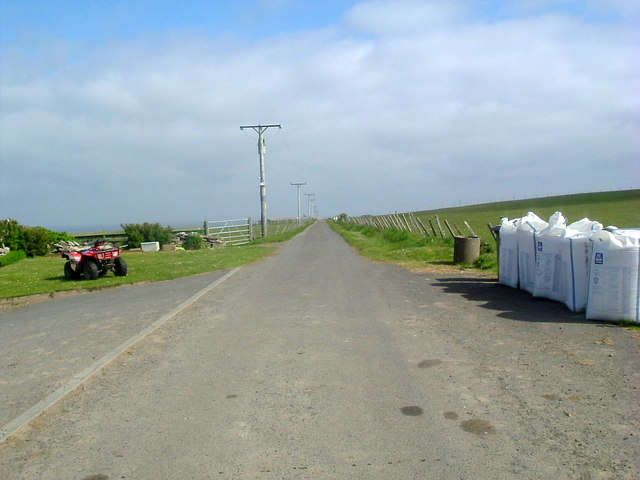
Looking southeast from the settlement.

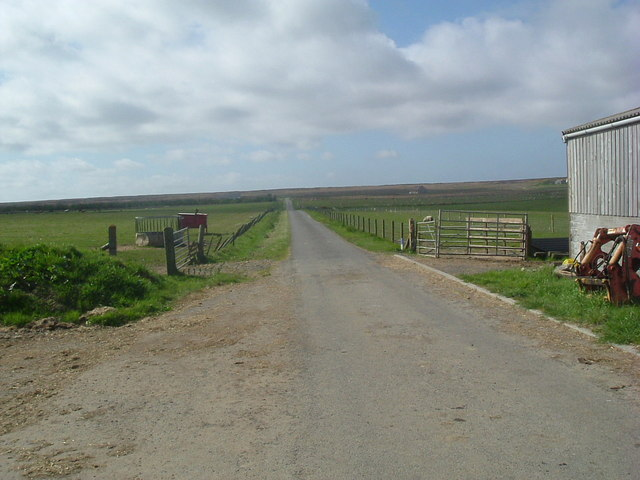
Looking northeast from Auckengill.

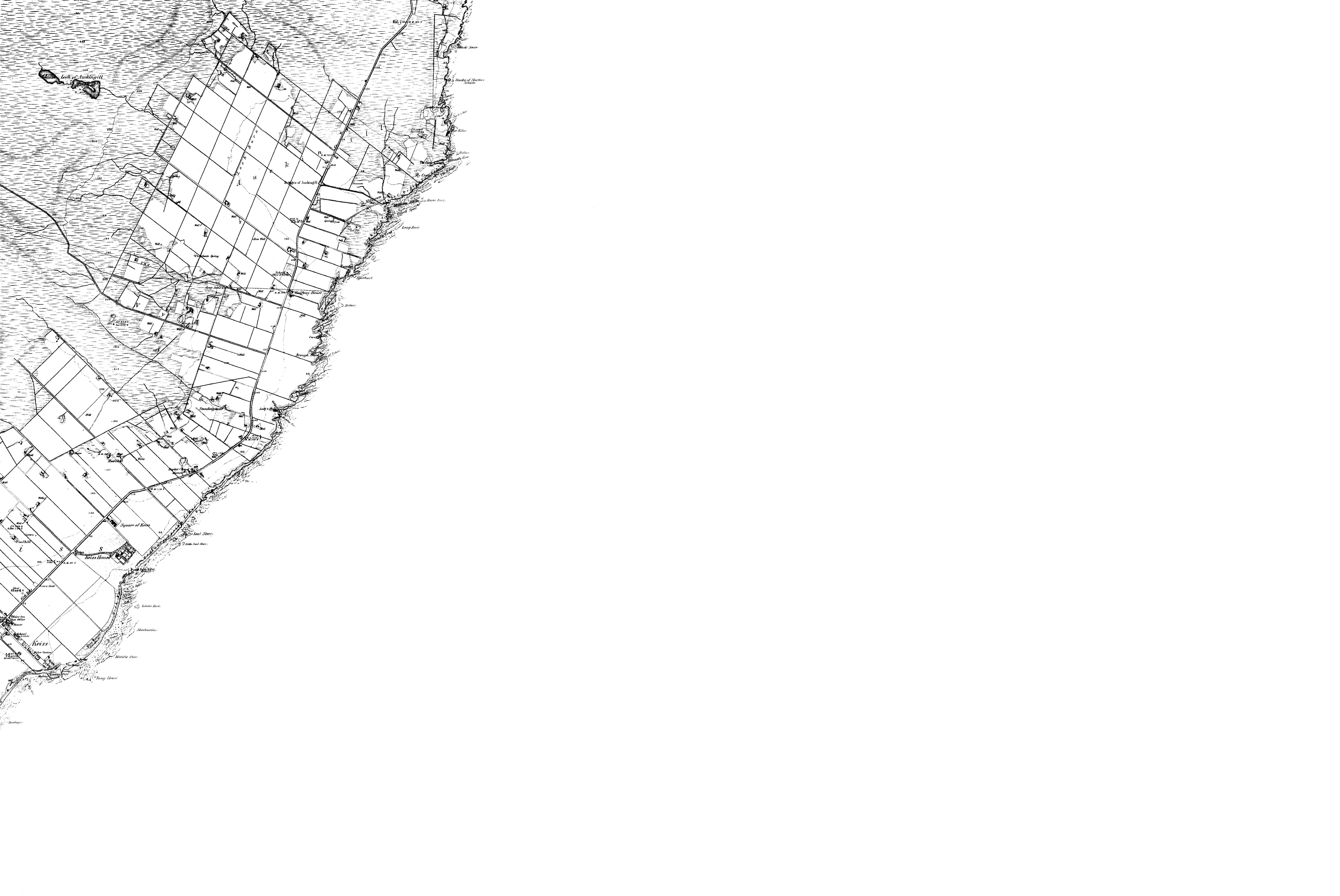
Map of Caithness of 1878-1879 map showing land available for cultivation.

== See also ==
- List of places in Highland
