= North Woods =

North Woods or Northwoods may refer to:

- Laurentian Mixed Forest Province, a forested ecoregion in the United States and Canada also known as the North Woods.
- Operation Northwoods, a proposed operation against the Cuban government that originated within the Department of Defense and the Joint Chiefs of Staff of the United States government in 1962.
- Northwoods (forest), the boreal forest of North America.
- North Woods and North Meadow in Central Park, Manhattan, New York, United States
- North Woods (novel), a 2023 novel by Daniel Mason

== See also ==
- Great North Woods, United States
  - Great North Woods Region (New Hampshire)
  - North Maine Woods
- Northwoods League, a collegiate summer baseball league
- Northwood (disambiguation)
