= John Northleigh =

English physician

- Born: 1657; Hamburg
- Died: 17 January 1704 (aged 46–47)
- Occupation: Physician

John Northleigh (1657 – 17 January 1704) was an English physician.

== Biography ==
Northleigh born at Hamburg in 1657, was son of John Northleigh, merchant, of Exminster, Devonshire. Another account makes him born at Cadeleigh, Devonshire. He matriculated as a sojourner from Exeter College, Oxford, on 23 March 1674–5, aged 17, and in 1681 graduated B.C.L. In 1682 he became a student of the Middle Temple, and was in the same year incorporated LL.B. at Magdalene College, Cambridge (Foster, Alumni Oxon. 1500–1714, iii. 1078). He was subsequently chosen fellow of King's College, Cambridge, proceeded LL.D. in 1687, and eventually became M.D. In May 1688 he was an unsuccessful candidate for a fellowship at All Souls' College, Oxford. He was an adherent of James II, and wrote ably in his defence. For many years he practised at Exeter, but apparently devoted more attention to polemical theology than to his profession. He was an ardent supporter of the church of England, and distinguished himself by various writings against the independents and presbyterians. He died on the 17th and was buried in Exeter Cathedral on 24 January 1704–5, leaving by his wife Frances (d. 1715) a son John (1701–1726). A monument to their memory was placed on the south side of the lady-chapel in Exeter Cathedral.

Northleigh wrote:

- ‘Exercitationes Philologicæ tres: prima Infanticidium, poema credulam exprimens matrem … prolem suam interfecisse. Secunda Spes extatica … Tertia Philosophia vindicata,’ &c., 4to, Oxford, 1681.
- ‘The Parallel, or the new specious Association an old rebellious Covenant; closing with a disparity between a true Patriot and a factious Associator’ [anon.], folio, London, 1682, highly commended by Dr. Laurence Womack in his ‘Letter containing a farther Justification of the Church of England against the Dissenters,’ 1682 (p. 59).
- ‘A Genteel Reflection on the Modest Account [by Lord Shaftesbury], and a Vindication of the Loyal Abhorrers from the calumnies of a factious pen,’ folio, London, 1682.
- ‘The Triumph of our Monarchy over the Plots and Principles of our Rebels and Republicans, being Remarks on their most Eminent Libels,’ 8vo, London, 1685.
- ‘Parliamentum Pacificum, or the Happy Union of King and People in an healing Parliament,’ 4to, London, March 1688. This ingenious, smartly written defence of James II elicited three answers in Dutch, besides being translated into French and Dutch. Gilbert Burnet, afterwards bishop of Salisbury, who had been assailed in it on account of his letter addressed from the Hague to Lord Middleton on 3 May 1687, replied in a ‘Vindication of himself,’ whereupon Northleigh rejoined with
- ‘Dr. Burnet's Reflections upon a Book, entituled “Parliamentum Pacificum” ... answered,’ 4to, London, July 1688.
- ‘Topographical Descriptions, with Historico-Political and Medico-Physical Observations made in two several Voyages through most parts of Europe,’ 8vo, London, 1702 (reprinted in vol. ii. of J. Harris's ‘Bibliotheca,’ edits. 1705 and 1744). A second volume was to have contained Italy, and a third Germany, Hungary, Denmark, and Sweden, but only the first volume, containing the Netherlands, France, Savoy, and Piedmont, appeared. There is no indication of the periods at which the tours were made.

Two letters from Northleigh to Archbishop Sancroft, dated respectively 2 June 1688 and January 1692–3, are among the Tanner MSS. in the Bodleian Library (xxviii. 92 and xxv. 420). A copy of the second letter is in Rawlinson MS. C. 739, f. 138.
