= Norton Green, Stoke-on-Trent =

Hamlet in Staffordshire, England

Coordinates: 53.06°N 02.15°W

Norton Green
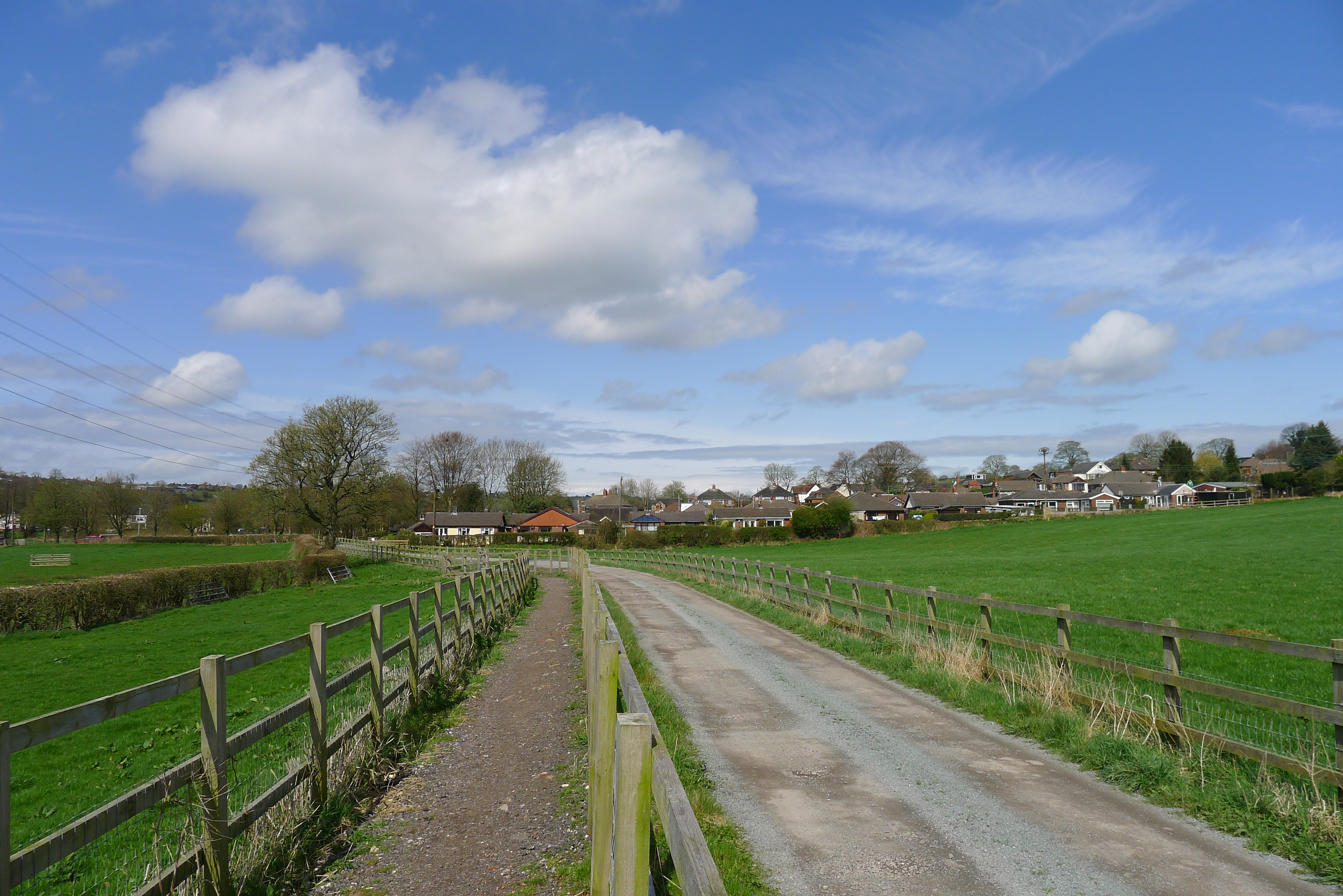
- Moorlands Walk approaching Norton Green

- Location within Staffordshire
- OS grid reference: SJ9052
- District: Stoke-on-Trent
- Shire county: Staffordshire
- Region: West Midlands
- Country: England
- Sovereign state: United Kingdom
- Post town: Stoke-on-Trent
- Postcode district: ST6
- Police: Staffordshire
- Fire: Staffordshire
- Ambulance: West Midlands
- UK Parliament: Stoke-on-Trent

Norton Green is a small hamlet in Stoke-on-Trent. Located in the hamlet are two Primitive Methodist Chapels which were built in 1857 and 1871.
