= Nurton =

Hamlet in Staffordshire, England

Coordinates: 52.5919°N 2.2391°W

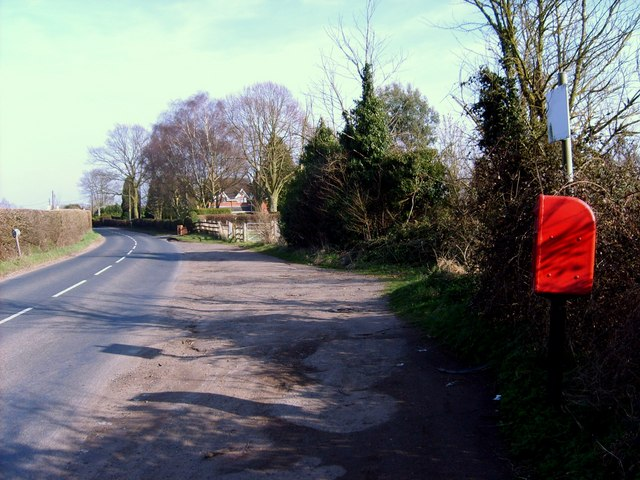
- Nurton Postbox

- Location within Staffordshire
- Civil parish: Pattingham and Patshull
- District: South Staffordshire
- Shire county: Staffordshire
- Region: West Midlands
- Country: England
- Sovereign state: United Kingdom
- Police: Staffordshire
- Fire: Staffordshire
- Ambulance: West Midlands

Nurton is a hamlet in the civil parish of Pattingham and Patshull, in the South Staffordshire district, in the English county of Staffordshire. Nearby settlements include the city of Wolverhampton and the villages of Perton and Pattingham. It was called "Uverlon" meaning "upper town".
