= Northwood School =

Northwood School could be:

- Northwood School (Lake Placid, New York)
- Northwood School, London
- Northwood Public School, Windsor, Ontario
