= Northlea =

Area of Seaham, County Durham, England

Coordinates: 54.843°N 1.357°W

Northlea is an area of Seaham, County Durham, England, to the north west of Seaham town centre and close to the North Sea coast.
