= Nuptown =

Hamlet in Berkshire, England

Coordinates: 51.454345°N 0.723908°W

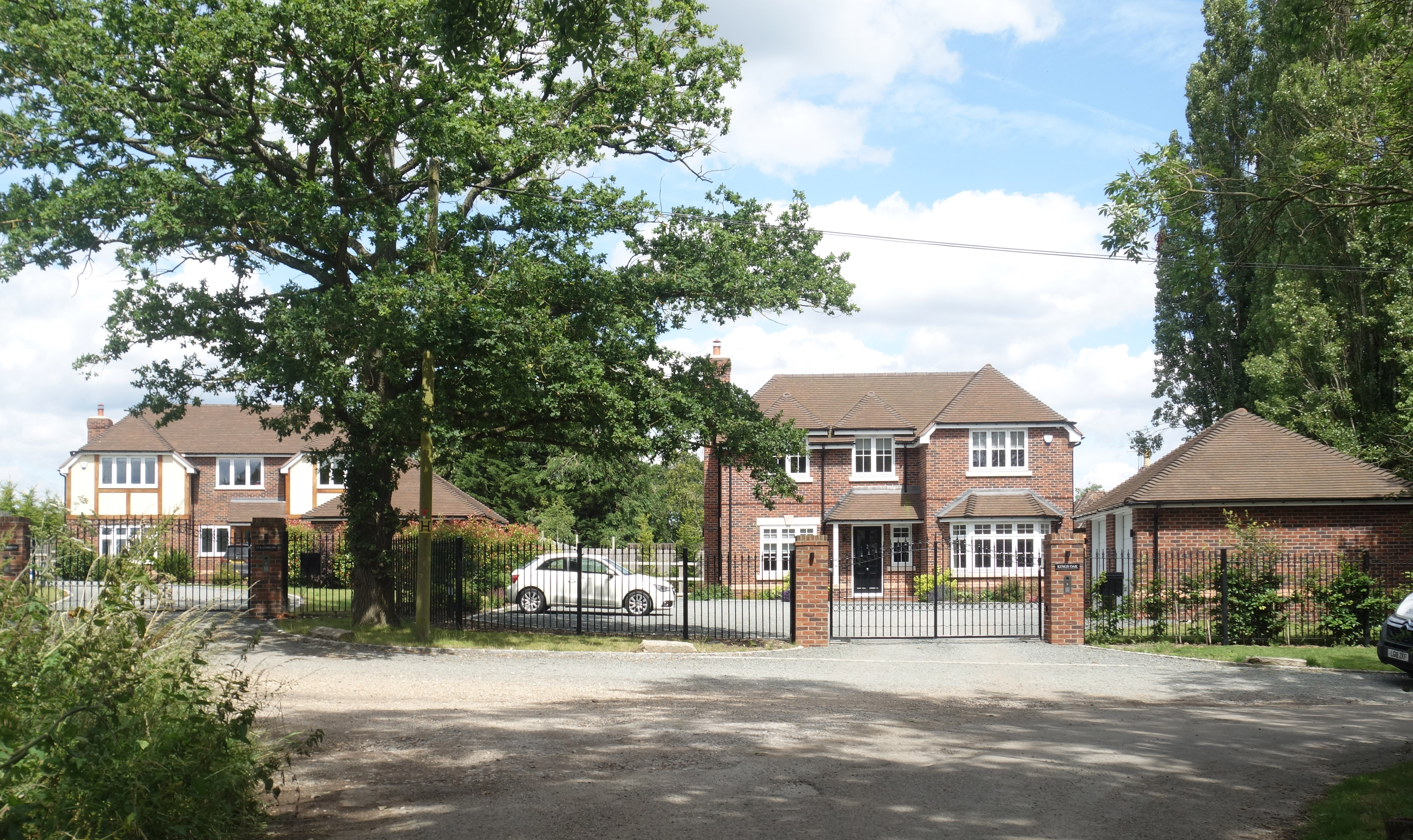
- Hawthorn Lane

- Location within Berkshire
- OS grid reference: SU885731
- Metropolitan borough: Bracknell Forest
- Metropolitan county: Berkshire
- Region: South East
- Country: England
- Sovereign state: United Kingdom
- Post town: BRACKNELL
- Postcode district: SL5
- Dialling code: 01344
- Police: Thames Valley
- Fire: Royal Berkshire
- Ambulance: South Central
- UK Parliament: Maidenhead

Nuptown is a hamlet in Berkshire, England, and part of the civil parish of Warfield.

The settlement lies near to the A330 road, and is located approximately 3 miles (4.8 km) north-east of Bracknell. On some old maps it is called Upton Green.
