= Nybster =

Township in Caithness, Scotland

Coordinates: 58.555836°N 3.08802°W

Nybster: Scottish Gaelic: Niabost
- Location within the Caithness area
- OS grid reference: ND367876
- Council area: Highland
- Lieutenancy area: Inverness
- Country: Scotland
- Sovereign state: United Kingdom
- Post town: Wick
- Postcode district: KW14
- Police: Scotland
- Fire: Scottish
- Ambulance: Scottish
- UK Parliament: Caithness, Sutherland and Easter Ross
- Scottish Parliament: Caithness, Sutherland and Ross

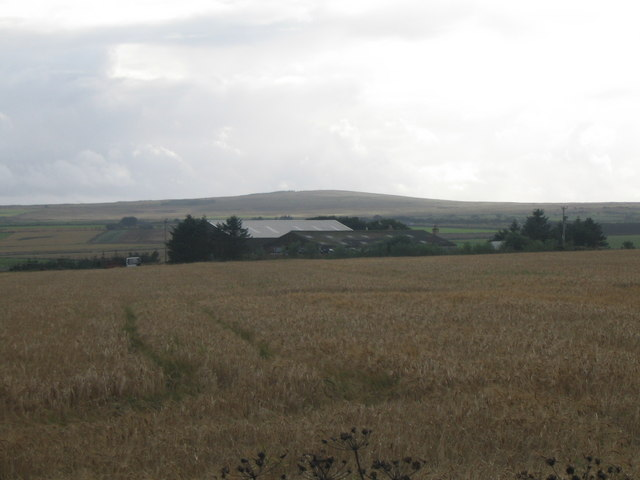
A view looking to the southwest over cropland from the B874, towards the buildings of Nybster Farm. Achlibster Hill can be seen on the skyline.

Nybster is a scattered rural and crofting township, situated in Caithness and is in the Scottish council area of Highland. It is located along the A9 road, 0.5 miles (0.80 km) south of Auckengill and 7 miles (11 km) south of John o' Groats.

It is the location of the Nybster Broch, first excavated by Rev James Maxwell Joass (of Golspie in 1895 and again by Sir Francis Tress Barry in about 1900. A broch is an Iron Age building that is unique to Scotland. This one was probably built between about 200 BC and 200 AD and re-used during the Pictish period (AD 300 - 800). The Caithness Broch Centre nearby provides an opportunity to learn more about the communities that lived in the brochs, those who excavated them and the communities who are still involved with them today.
