= Northwood High School =

Northwood High School may refer to:

- Northwood High School (Irvine, California)
- Northwood High School (Louisiana)
- Northwood High School (Maryland)
- NorthWood High School, Nappanee, Indiana
- Northwood High School (North Carolina), Pittsboro, North Carolina
- Northwood High School (Ohio), Northwood, Ohio
- Northwood High School (Saltville, Virginia)
- Northwood High School (Wisconsin), Minong, Wisconsin
- Northwood School (Lake Placid, New York)
