= Norton Township, Winona County, Minnesota =

Norton Township, Minnesota
- Township
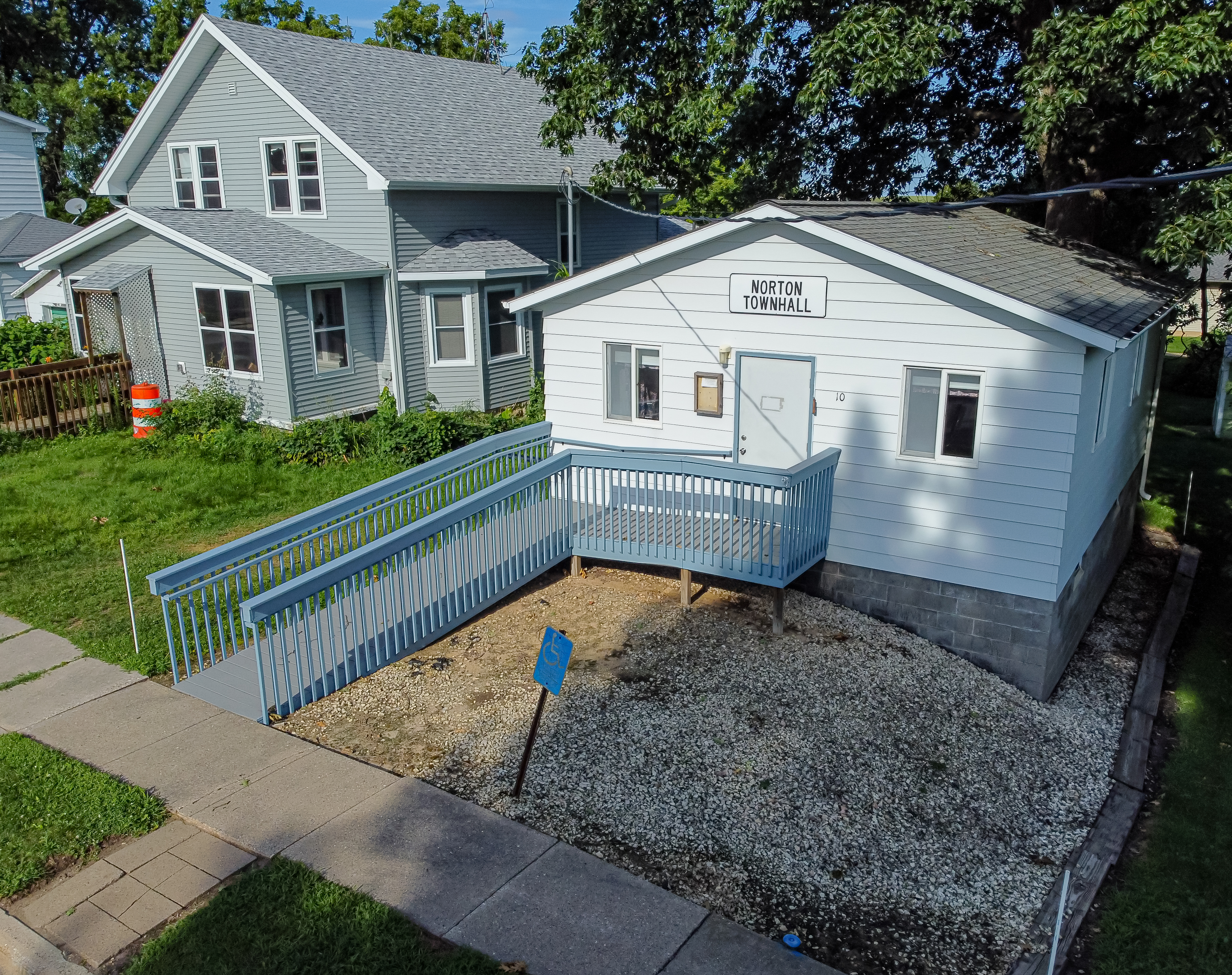
- Town hall in Altura

- Location within the state of Minnesota Norton Township, Minnesota (the United States)
- Coordinates: 44°4′2″N 91°53′12″W
- Country: United States
- State: Minnesota
- County: Winona

Area
  - Total: 32.6 sq mi (84.5 km^{2})
  - Land: 32.6 sq mi (84.5 km^{2})
  - Water: 0 sq mi (0.0 km^{2})
- Elevation: 860 ft (262 m)

Population (2000)
  - Total: 490
  - Density: 15/sq mi (5.8/km^{2})
- Time zone: UTC-6 (Central (CST))
  - Summer (DST): UTC-5 (CDT)
- ZIP code: 55910
- Area code: 507
- FIPS code: 27-47374
- GNIS feature ID: 0665177

Norton Township is a township in Winona County, Minnesota, United States. The population was 490 at the 2010 census.

== History ==
Norton Township was originally called Sumner Township, and under the latter name was organized in 1858. The name was changed to Jefferson Township, until finally being changed again to Norton, in honor of James L. Norton, a Minnesota legislator.

== Geography ==
According to the United States Census Bureau, the township has a total area of 32.6 square miles (84.5 km^{2}), all land.

== Demographics ==
As of the census of 2000, there were 527 people, 181 households, and 139 families residing in the township. The population density was 16.2 people per square mile (6.2/km^{2}). There were 190 housing units at an average density of 5.8/sq mi (2.2/km^{2}). The racial makeup of the township was 98.48% White, 0.57% Asian, 0.38% Pacific Islander, and 0.57% from two or more races.

There were 181 households, out of which 38.7% had children under the age of 18 living with them, 69.1% were married couples living together, 3.9% had a female householder with no husband present, and 22.7% were non-families. 18.2% of all households were made up of individuals, and 8.3% had someone living alone who was 65 years of age or older. The average household size was 2.91 and the average family size was 3.34.

In the township the population was spread out, with 29.6% under the age of 18, 8.7% from 18 to 24, 26.0% from 25 to 44, 24.3% from 45 to 64, and 11.4% who were 65 years of age or older. The median age was 38 years. For every 100 females, there were 111.6 males. For every 100 females age 18 and over, there were 105.0 males.

The median income for a household in the township was $43,636, and the median income for a family was $44,306. Males had a median income of $35,368 versus $22,500 for females. The per capita income for the township was $16,211. About 4.3% of families and 5.3% of the population were below the poverty line, including 5.3% of those under age 18 and 8.0% of those age 65 or over.
