= Nunholm =

Cricket ground in Dumfries, Scotland

Coordinates: 55°04′52.38″N 03°36′32.58″W

Ground information
- Location: Dumfries, Scotland
- Establishment: 1853; 172 years ago

Team information
Scotland	(1988)
- As of 19 October 2011; Source: Ground profile

Nunholm is a cricket ground in Dumfries, Scotland. The first recorded match held on the ground came in 1979 when Scotland B played a combined Central Lancashire League team. The ground held its first and to date only first-class match when Scotland played Ireland in 1988, which Scotland won by an innings and 43 runs.

The ground is used by Dumfries Cricket Club, who have played at Nunholm since they were formed in 1853.
