= Nursted =

Hamlet in Hampshire, England

Coordinates: 50.98552°N 0.91550°W

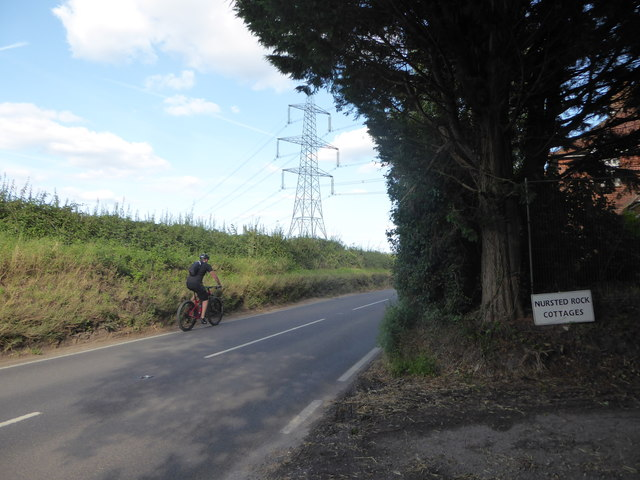
- Cyclist on the B2146

- Location within Hampshire
- OS grid reference: SU762212
- Civil parish: Buriton
- District: East Hampshire
- Shire county: Hampshire
- Region: South East
- Country: England
- Sovereign state: United Kingdom
- Post town: Petersfield
- Postcode district: GU31
- Police: Hampshire and Isle of Wight
- Fire: Hampshire and Isle of Wight
- Ambulance: South Central
- UK Parliament: East Hampshire

Nursted is a hamlet in the civil parish of Buriton, in the East Hampshire district of Hampshire, England. It is 1.8 miles (2.9 km) southeast of Petersfield, on the B21466 road. The hamlet sits directly on the Hampshire/West Sussex border.

The nearest railway station is Petersfield, 1.8 miles (2.9 km) northwest of the village.
