= Norton (given name) =

Norton is the given name of:

== People ==
- Norton Bush (1834–1894), American landscape painter
- Norton Clapp (1906–1995), American businessman, chairman of the Weyerhaeuser Corporation
- Norton Garfinkle (born 1931), economist, businessman and public servant
- Norton Juster (1929–2021), American architect and author, best known for writing the children's book The Phantom Tollbooth
- Norton Knatchbull, various people
- Norton Mezvinsky (1932–2022), American historian, professor, and author
- Norton Nascimento (1962–2007), Brazilian actor
- Norton A. Schwartz (born 1951), retired United States Air Force general and 19th Chief of Staff of the Air Force
- Norton Simon (1907–1993), American industrialist and philanthropist
- Norton Zinder (1928–2012), American biologist

== Fictional characters ==
- Norton, protagonist of the fantasy novel Bearing an Hourglass
- Norton Nork, simpleton created by Sandy Becker
- Norton Campbell, a playable survivor and hunter in the Chinese horror game Identity V.
