= Norton House (Swansea, Massachusetts) =

Historic house in Massachusetts, United States

- U.S. National Register of Historic Places
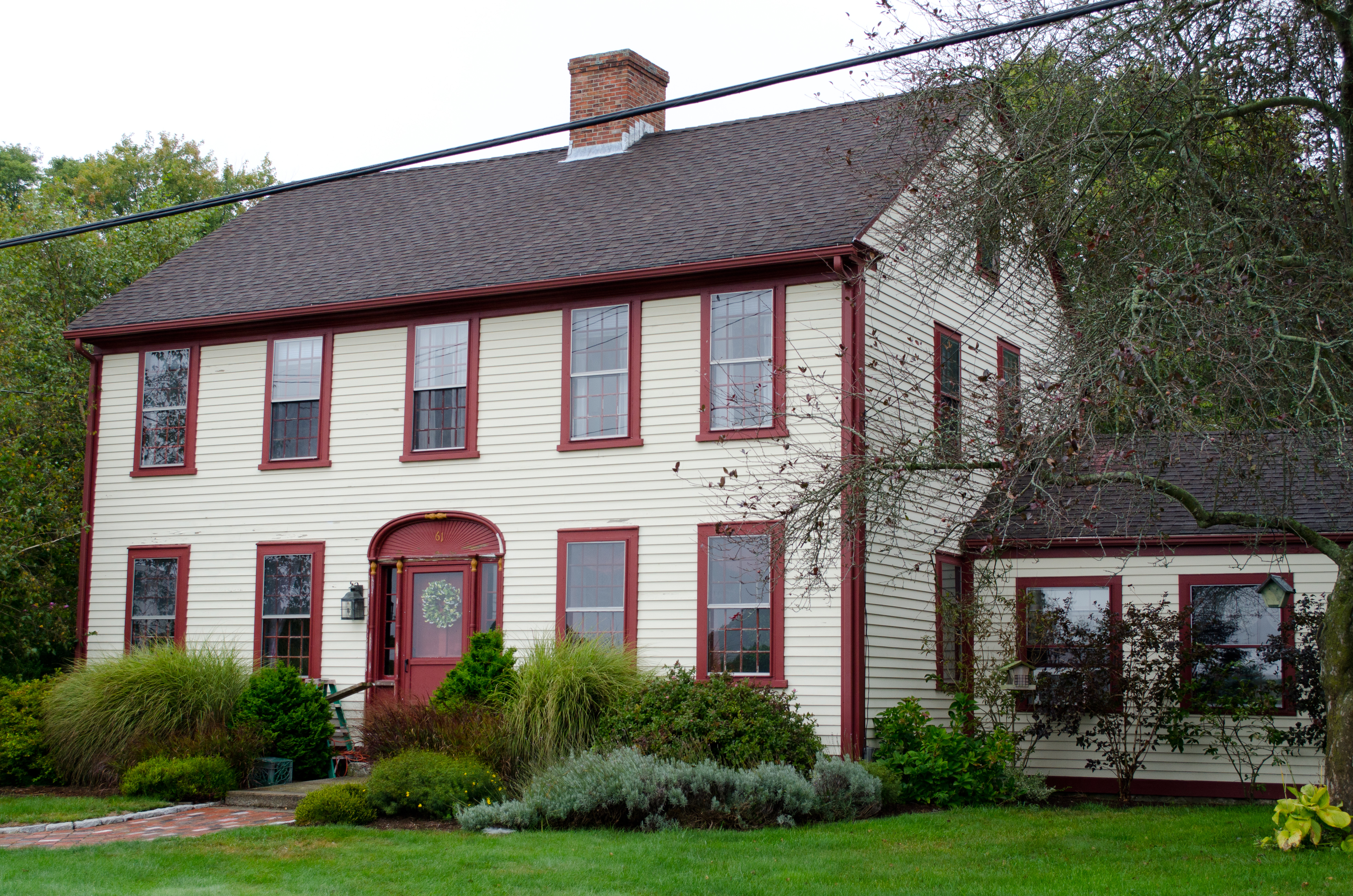

- Location within Massachusetts Location within the United States
- Location: 61 Old Providence Rd., Swansea, Massachusetts
- Coordinates: 41°46′21″N 71°16′27″W
- Built: c. 1779
- Architectural style: Georgian
- MPS: Swansea MRA
- NRHP reference No.: 90000078
- Added to NRHP: February 16, 1990

The Norton House is a historic house located in northern Swansea, Massachusetts.

== Description and history ==
It is a 2 1/2-story, wood-framed house, with a typical Georgian five-bay wide front facade and a large central chimney. Its main entrance, centered on the front facade, has sidelight windows and is topped by a Federal period elliptical fan. Built in about 1779, it is one of the older well-preserved houses in northern Swansea. In the early 20th century, it was owned by Benjamin Norton, part owner of a jewelry manufacturing business in nearby Barneyville.

The house was listed on the National Register of Historic Places on February 16, 1990.

== See also ==
- National Register of Historic Places listings in Bristol County, Massachusetts
