= Norton Green =

Hamlet on the Isle of Wight

Coordinates: 50.6928°N 1.5184°W

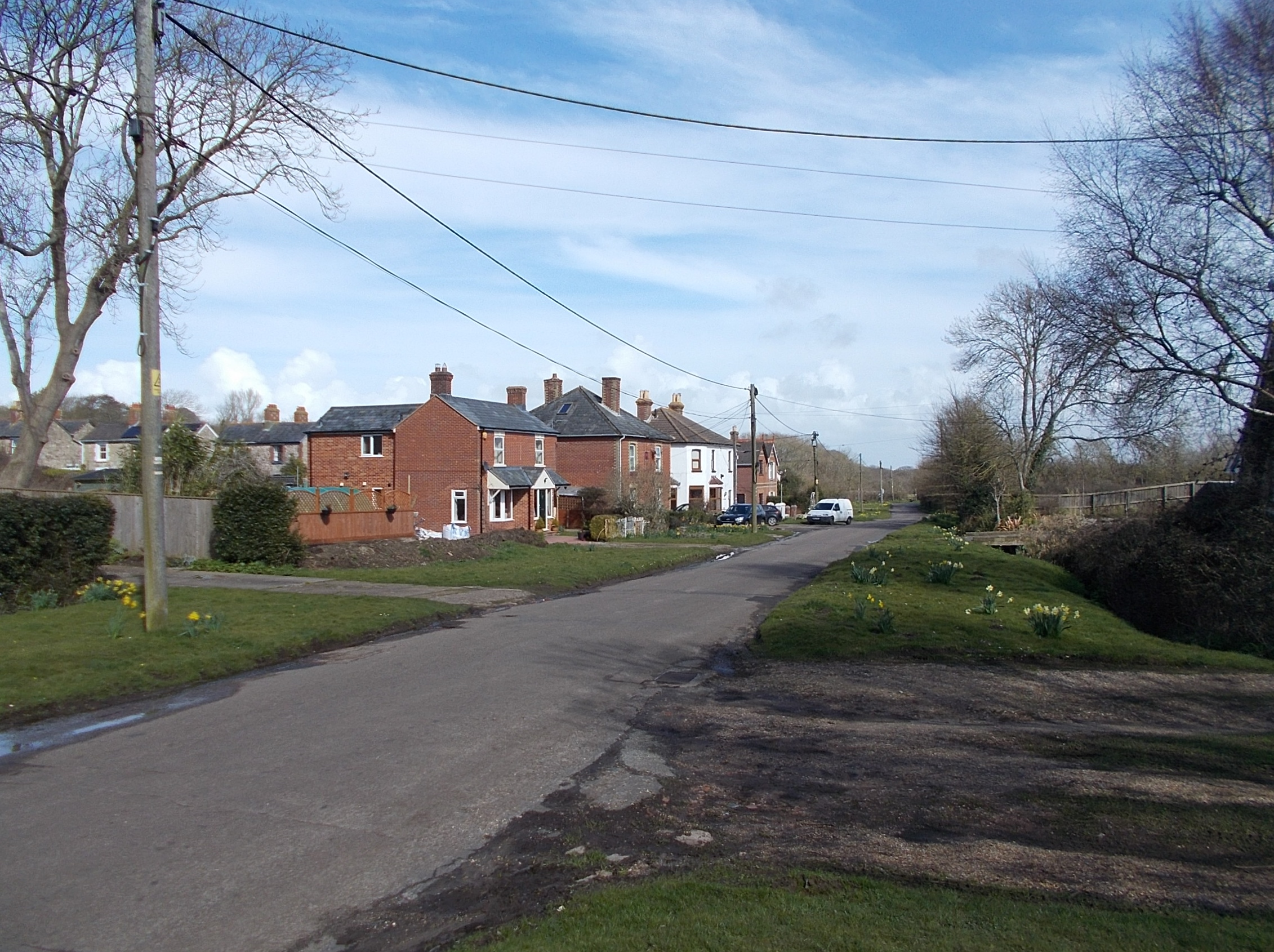
Norton Green

Norton Green is a hamlet on the Isle of Wight. It is located just north of Freshwater (where the 2011 Census was included) in the west of the island.
