= Norton, Isle of Wight =

Coordinates: 50.703°N 1.514°W

Norton
- Hamlet
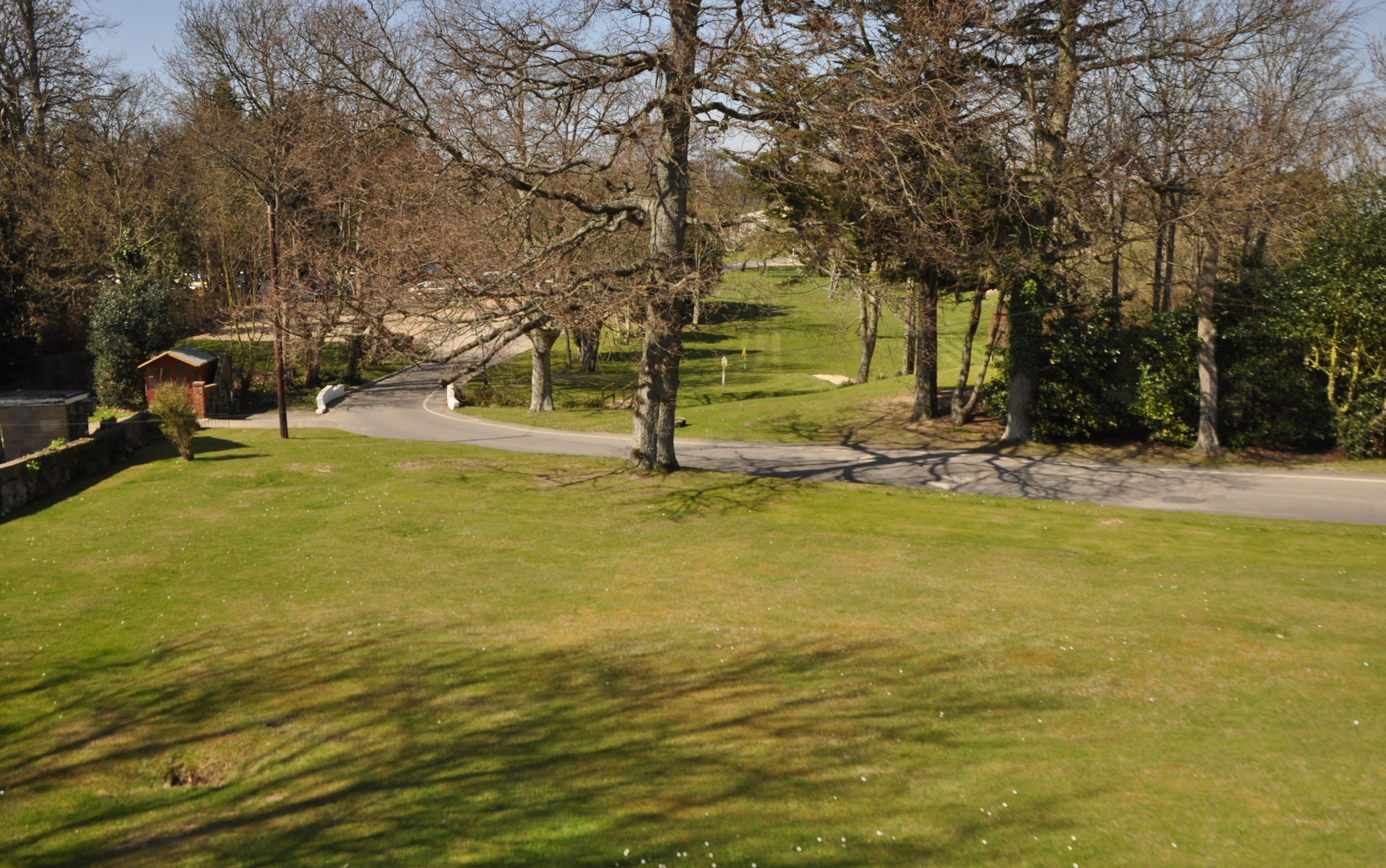

- Location within the Isle of Wight
- OS grid reference: SZ344894
- Civil parish: Freshwater
- Unitary authority: Isle of Wight
- Ceremonial county: Isle of Wight
- Region: South East
- Country: England
- Sovereign state: United Kingdom
- Post town: YARMOUTH
- Postcode district: PO41
- Dialling code: 01983
- Police: Hampshire and Isle of Wight
- Fire: Hampshire and Isle of Wight
- Ambulance: Isle of Wight
- UK Parliament: Isle of Wight West

Norton is a hamlet in the civil parish of Freshwater, on the outskirts of Yarmouth, in the Isle of Wight, England. It is situated in the West of the island and has a coast on the Solent. It is located 3.5 miles (5.6 km) southeast of Lymington, Hampshire.

== Transport ==
The A3054 road runs through the hamlet on its way towards Norton Green to the south and to Newport to east.

In the nearby Yarmouth, the Vehicle Ferry departs from Yarmouth Pier and goes to Lymington on the mainland.

The hamlet is served by the 7, A, Island Coaster and Needles Breezer buses which go to Newport, Alum Bay and Totland (Route 7), Yarmouth (Needles Breezer), Ryde (Island Coaster) and Freshwater Bay (Route A).
