= Basilia de Bermingham =

Irish religious patron (fl. 1250?)

Basilia de Bermingham (fl. 1250?) was a religious patron and ancestor of the family Mac Jordan of Connacht.

Basilia was a daughter of the heiress, Basilia de Worcester of Tipperary, and Meyler de Bermingham (died before 1275), the founder of Athenry. She had brothers Peter (died 1309?) and Archbishop William of Tuam (d. 1309). Her nephew, Rickard de Bermingham (d. 1322) won the Second Battle of Athenry in 1316.

She was married to Jordan de Exeter (fl. 1239–1258), by whom she had at least two children, Meyler, and Jordan Óge de Exeter.

The Register of the Dominican friars at Athenry contains an entertaining account of the transfer of the friary at Strade from the Franciscans to the Dominicans, at her insistence. "Having invited her father to a feast, she refused to eat until such time as her husband, Stephen de Exeter, replaced the Franciscan community with a Dominican one. He agreed and envoys were dispatched to Rome 'with a great sum of money' to confirm the arrangement."

It is said that the Dominican priory of Strade Abbey was founded at her request.
