= Rathfran Friary =

Dominican friary in County Mayo, Ireland

Priory of the Holy Cross
- Mainistir Ráth Bhrannaibh
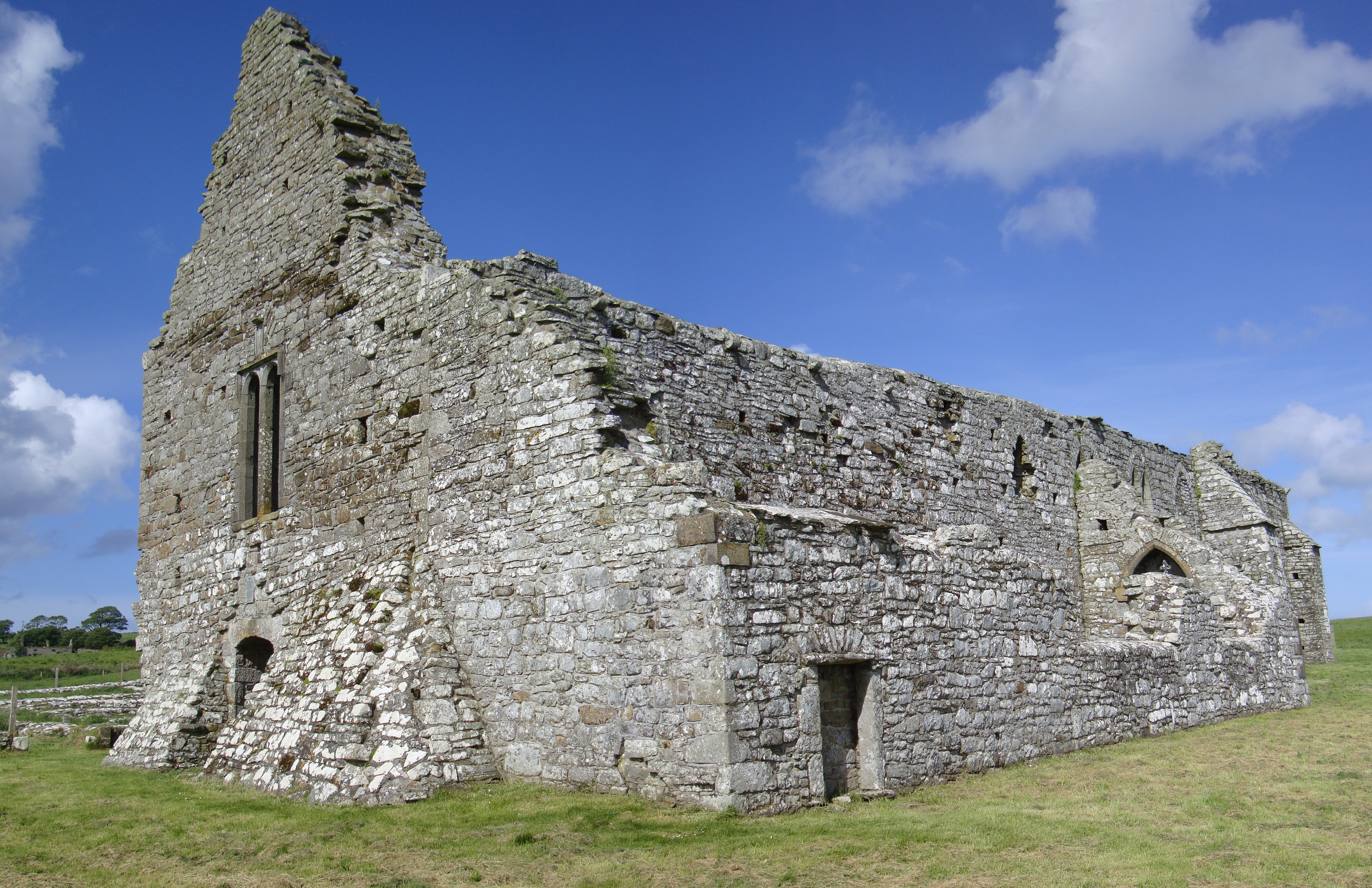

- Location within Ireland
- Interactive map of Priory of the Holy Cross

Monastery information
- Other names: Rathfran Friary/Priory; Rathbran; Raithbrain; Rahrany
- Order: Dominican Order
- Established: 1274
- Disestablished: 1577
- Diocese: Killala

People
- Founder: Stephen de Exeter?

Architecture
- Status: ruined
- Style: Norman

Site
- Location: Rathfran, Templemurry, County Mayo
- Coordinates: 54.238016°N 9.244378°W
- Visible remains: Church
- Public access: Yes

The Priory of the Holy Cross, also called Rathfran Friary or Rathfran Priory, is a former Dominican Friary and National Monument located in County Mayo, Ireland.

== Location ==
Rathfran Friary is located on the north bank of the tidal Cloonaghmore River where it flows into Killala Bay, 3.5 km (2.2 mi) NNW of Killala town.

== History ==
The friary at Rathfran was founded in 1274, purportedly by a de Exeter, possibly Stephen de Exeter or Richard de Exeter or William de Burgo. In the 15th Century some of the lancet windows in the south wall were built up, and at the same time a separate aisle was added and the nave partially rebuilt.

In the Yellow Book of Lecan (c. 1391–1401), Giolla Íosa Mór Mac Fir Bhisigh refers to the priory as Raith Branduibh as Bind Cluig, "Brandubh’s Fort of the Sweet Bells."

In 1438 indulgences were granted to those who could donate money to allow the building of a refectory and bell-tower. In 1458 it was reported that the friary was impoverished and reduced by wars and other disasters. Donatus Ó Conchobhair, Bishop of Killala 1461–67, was formerly a friar at Rathfran.

In February 1513, Edmond Burke, then ruler of Conmhaicne Cuile, was murdered at Rathfran, violating the sanctuary, by Theobald Reagh and Edmund Ciocarach, sons of Edmond's brother Walter Burke.

It was dissolved in 1577 and granted to Thomas de Exeter, and burned by Richard Bingham's army in 1590; the land was granted to William Taaffe in 1596. Friars lived in the area into the 18th century.

== Building ==
The 13th-century church is a long rectangle with a small crucifixion panel over the west door and the remains of a fine triple lancet east window. To the north of the church, there were originally two cloisters, but only the foundations remain to show where they stood. The living quarters to be seen north of the church date from the 16th century and incorporate part of the original sacristy.

== Gallery ==
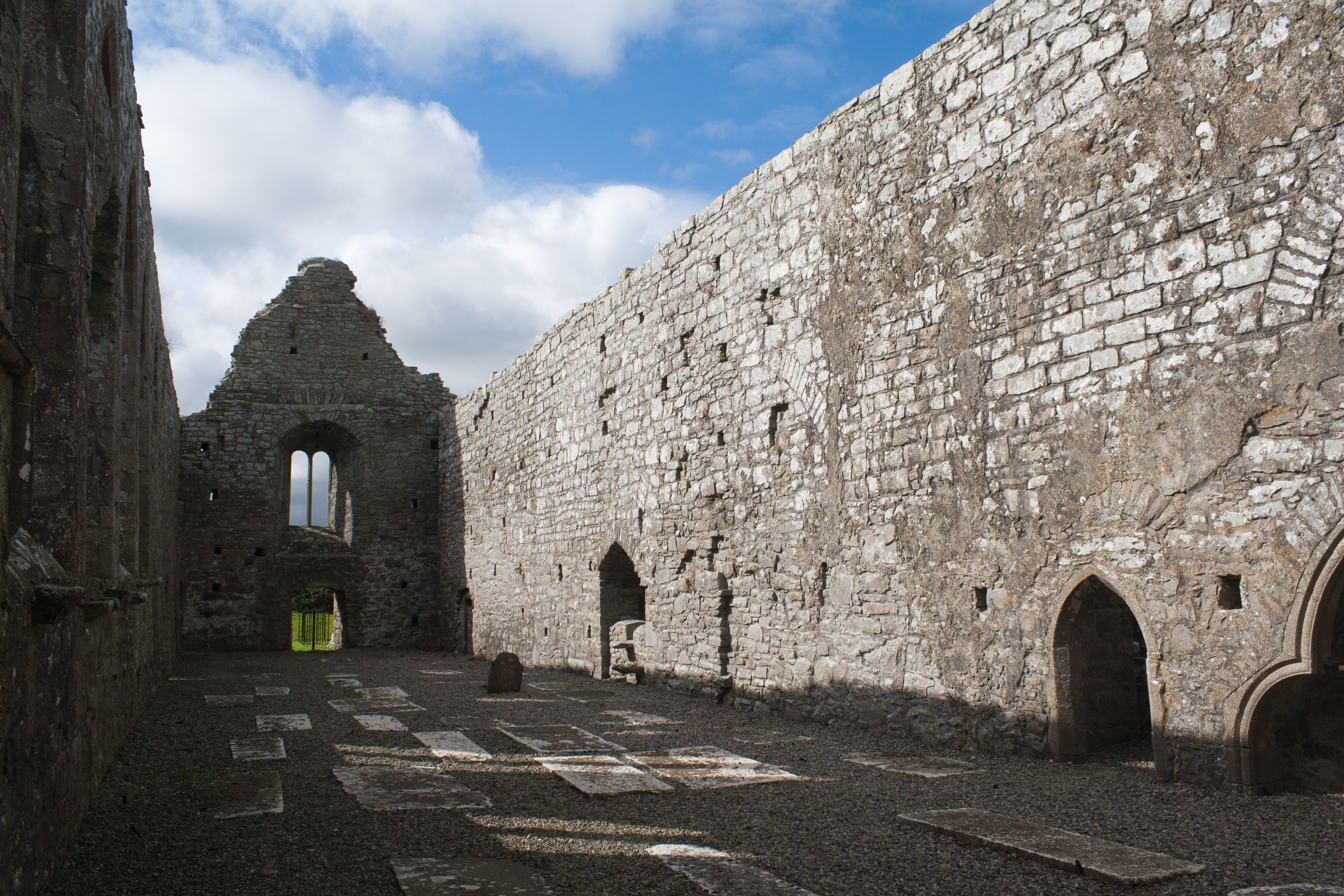
Nave

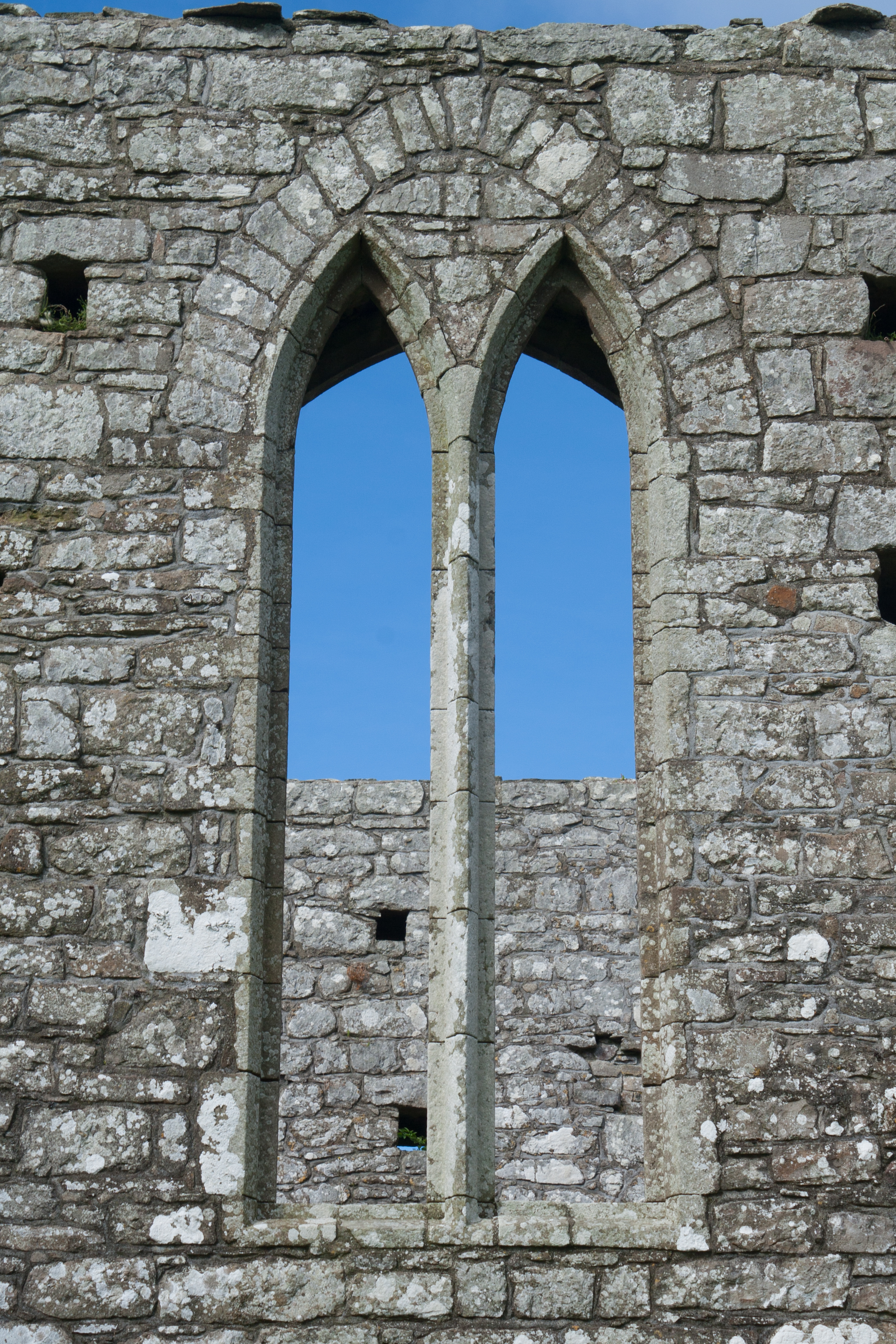
Lancet window in south wall

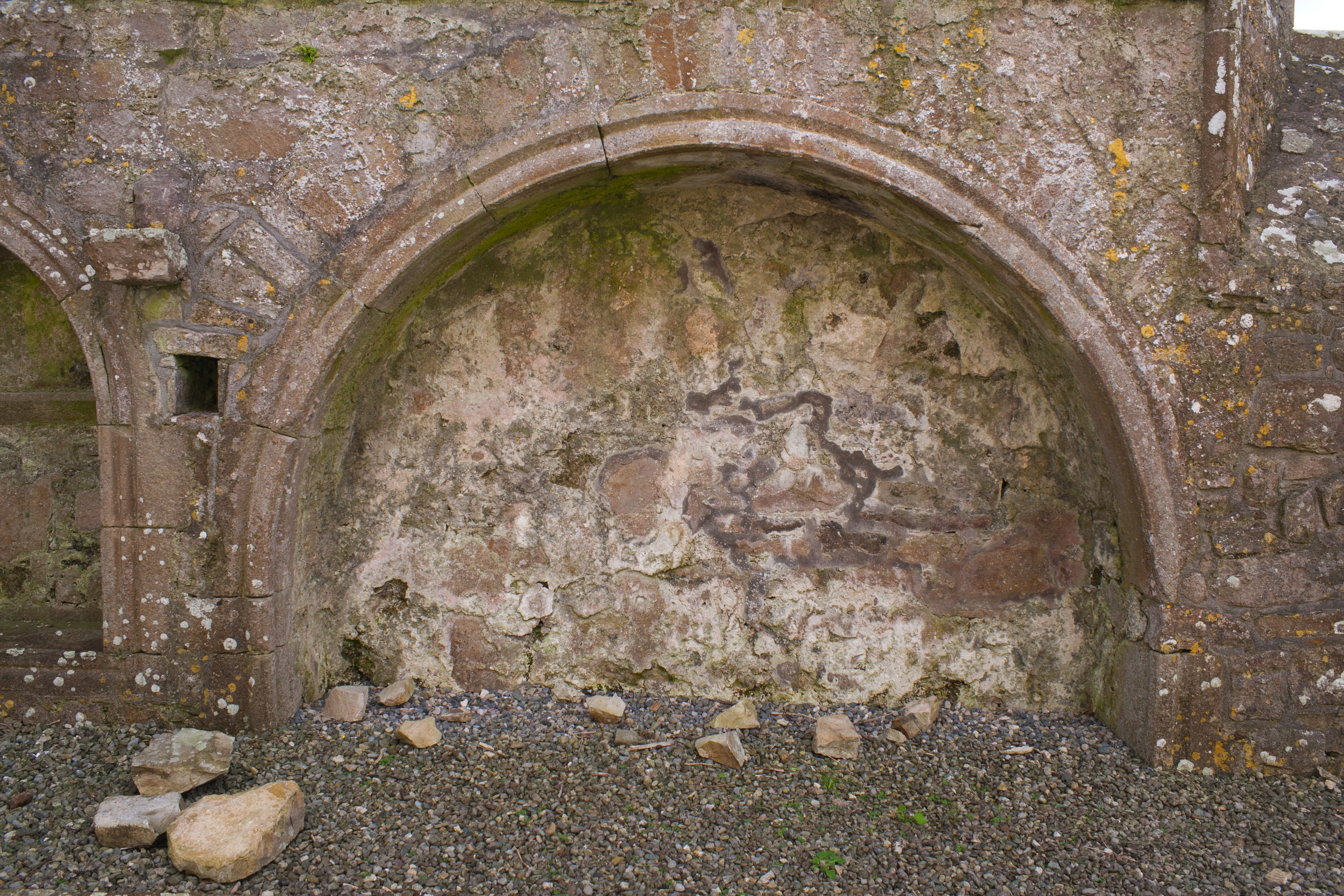
Sedilia

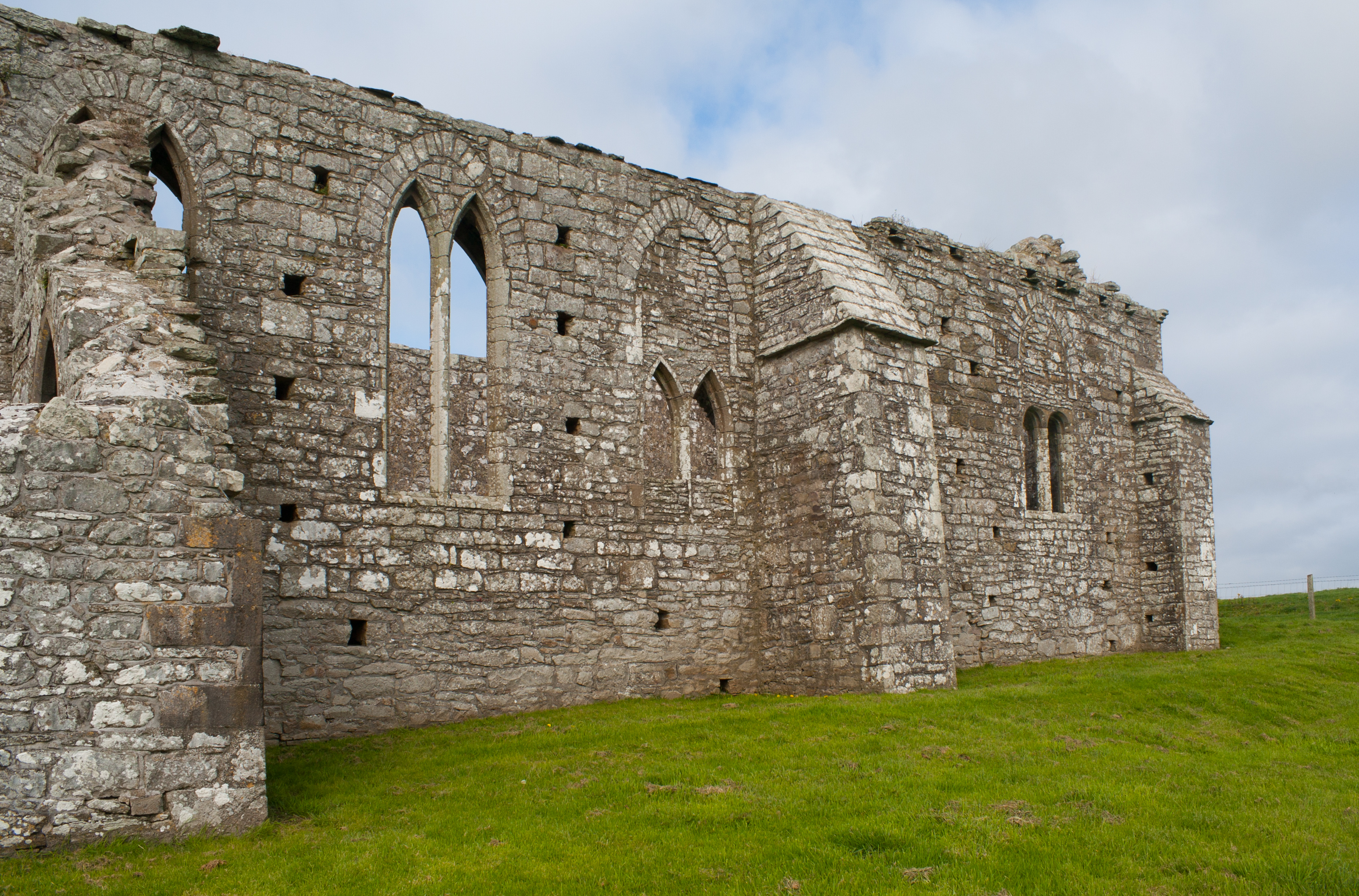
South wall

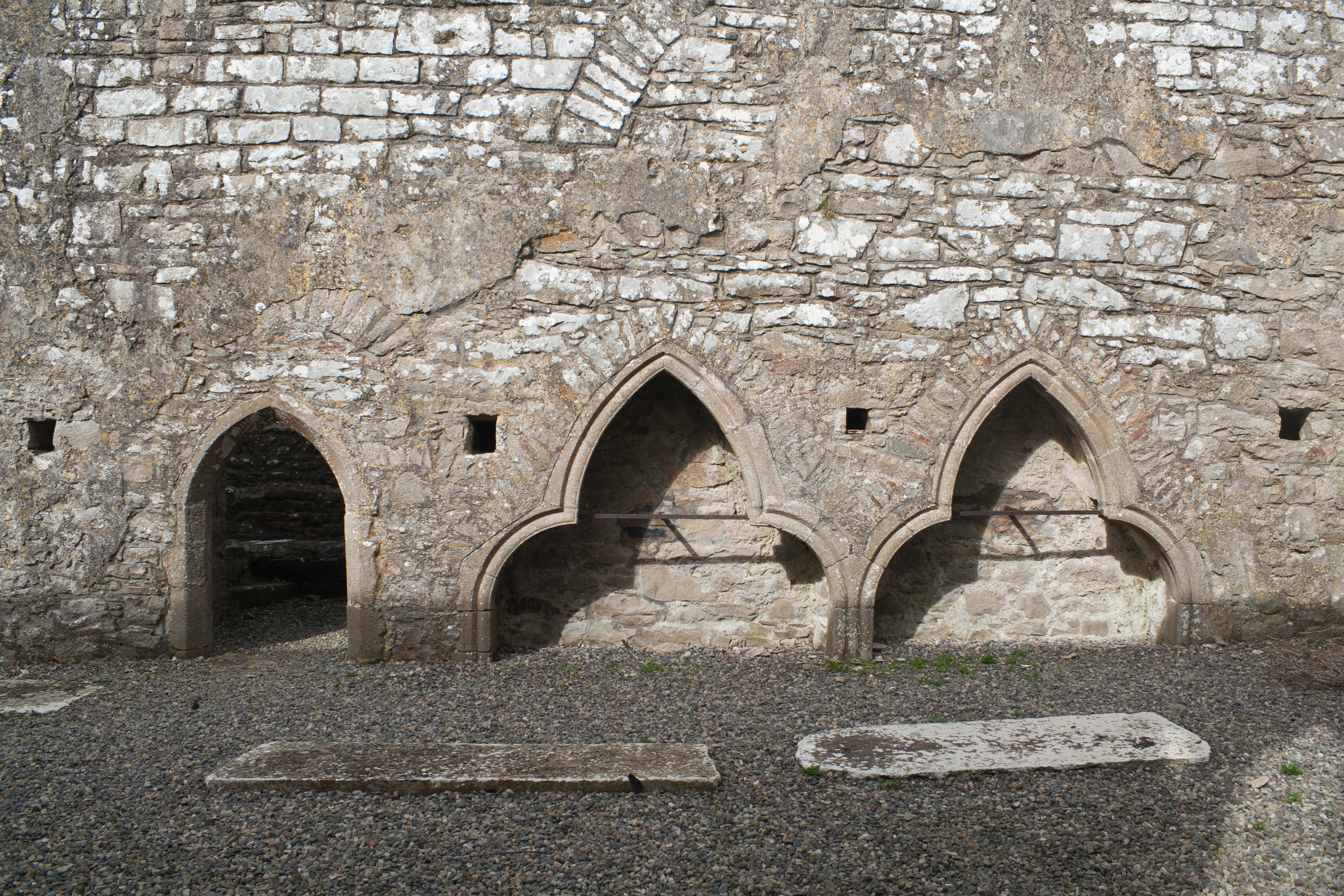
Tomb niches

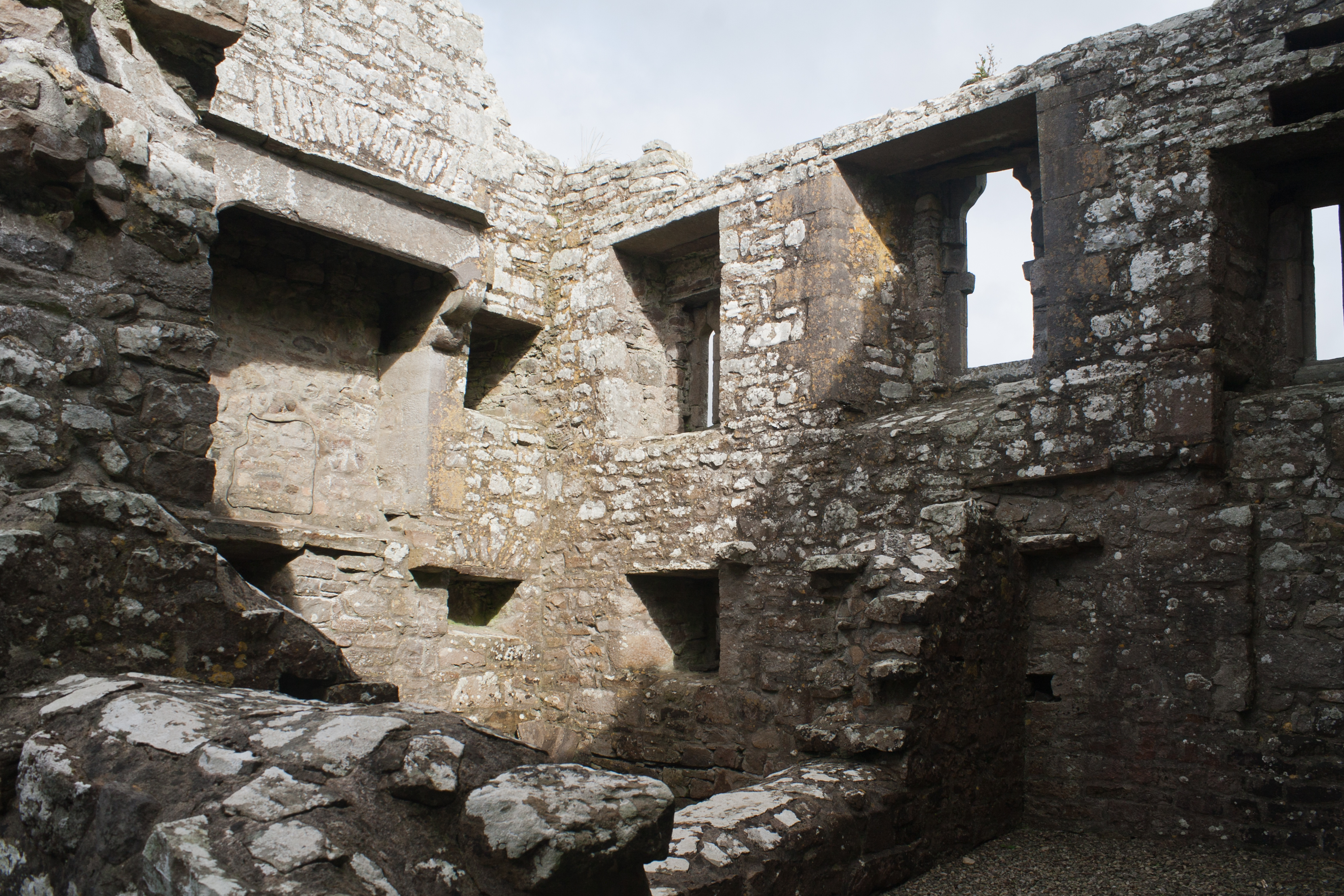
Sacristy and living quarters

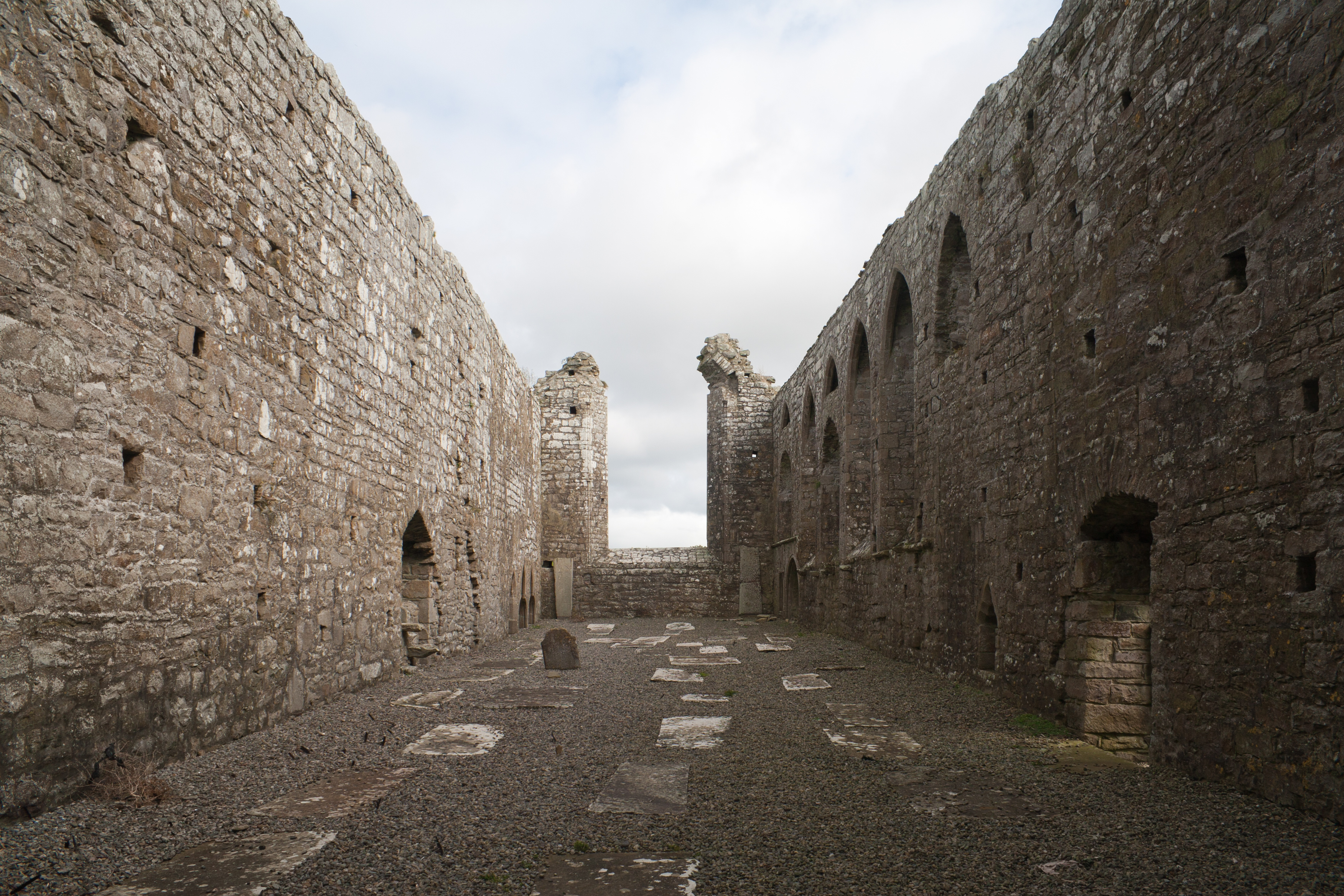
Nave and choir

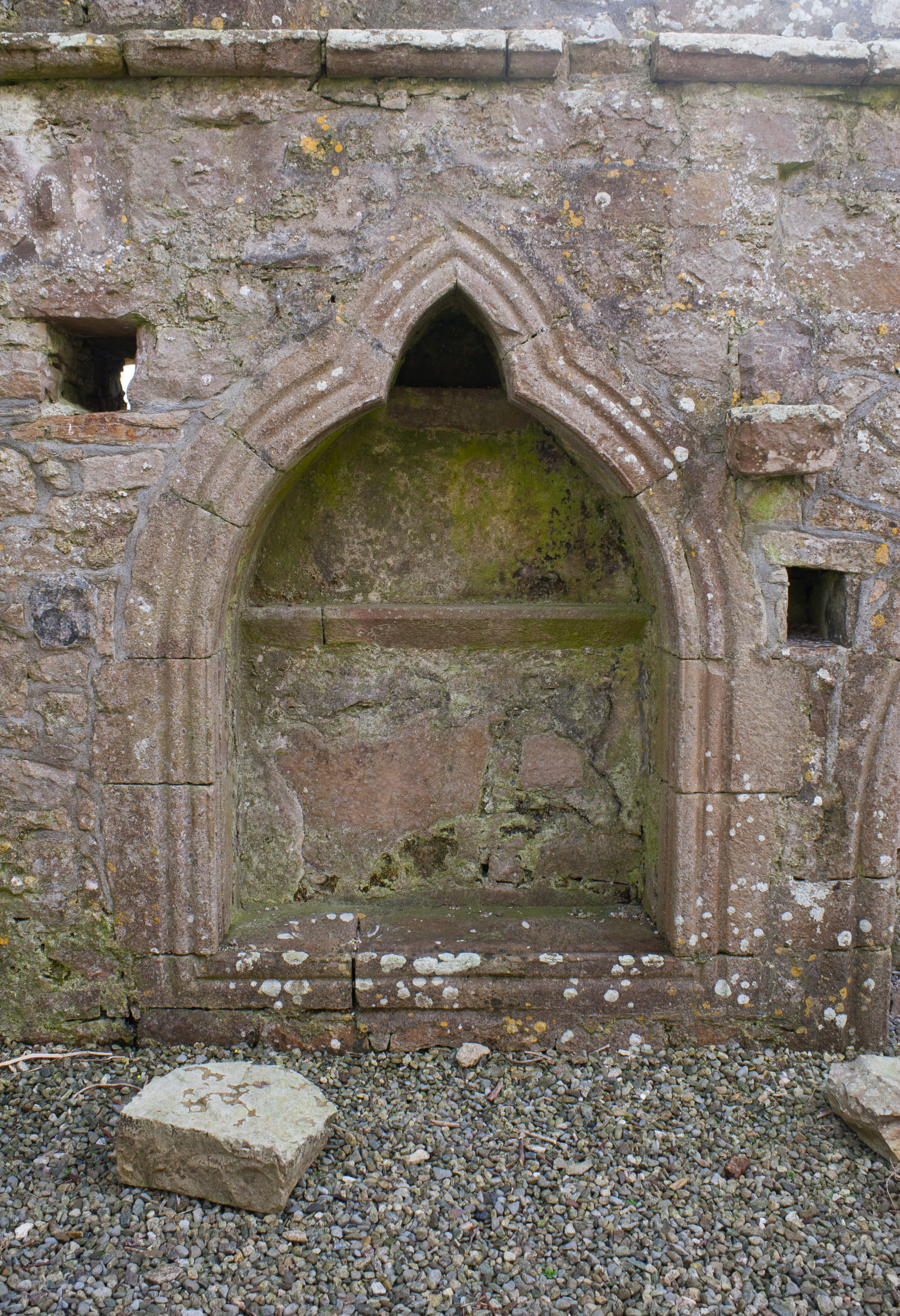
Piscina

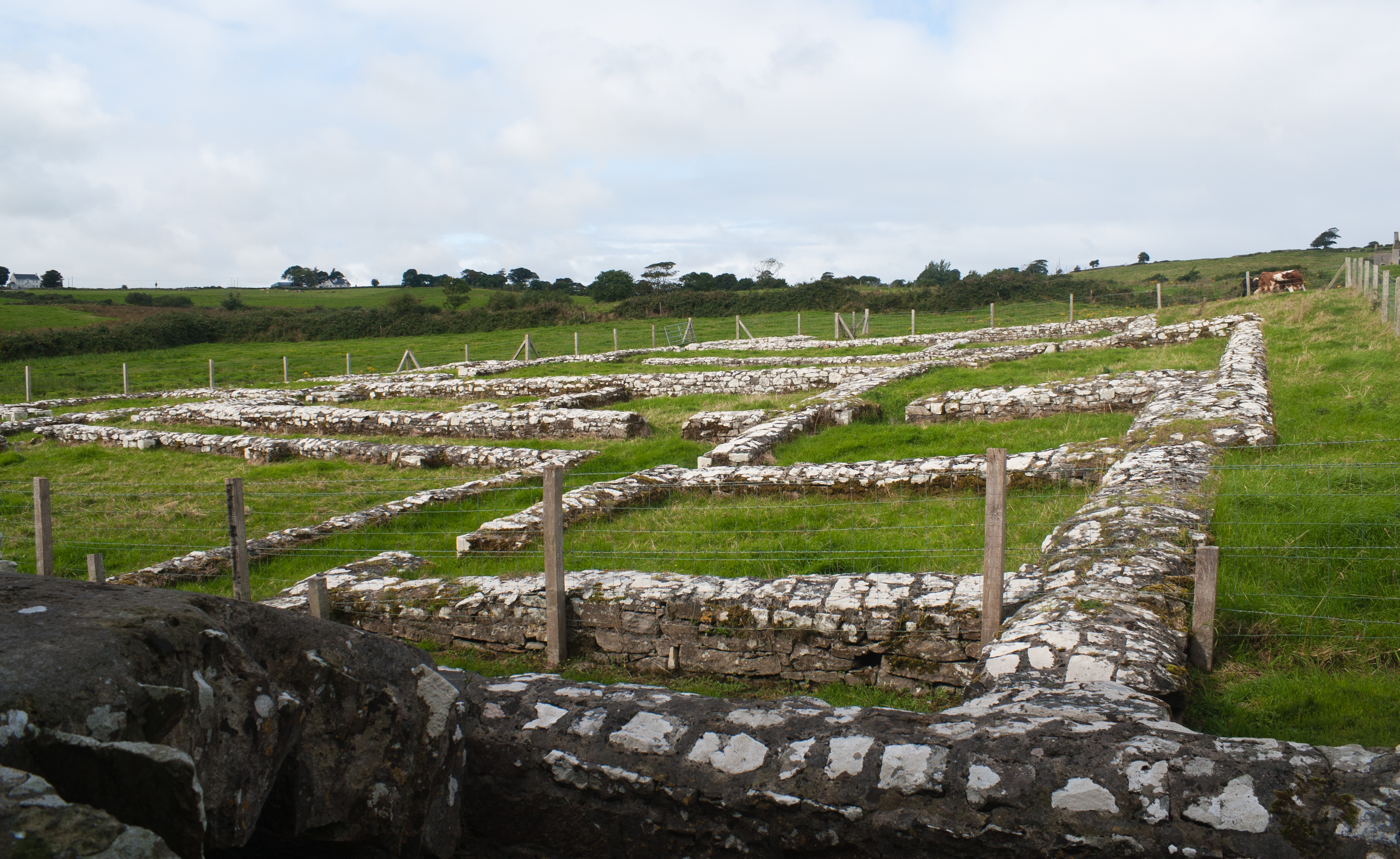
Cloister foundations

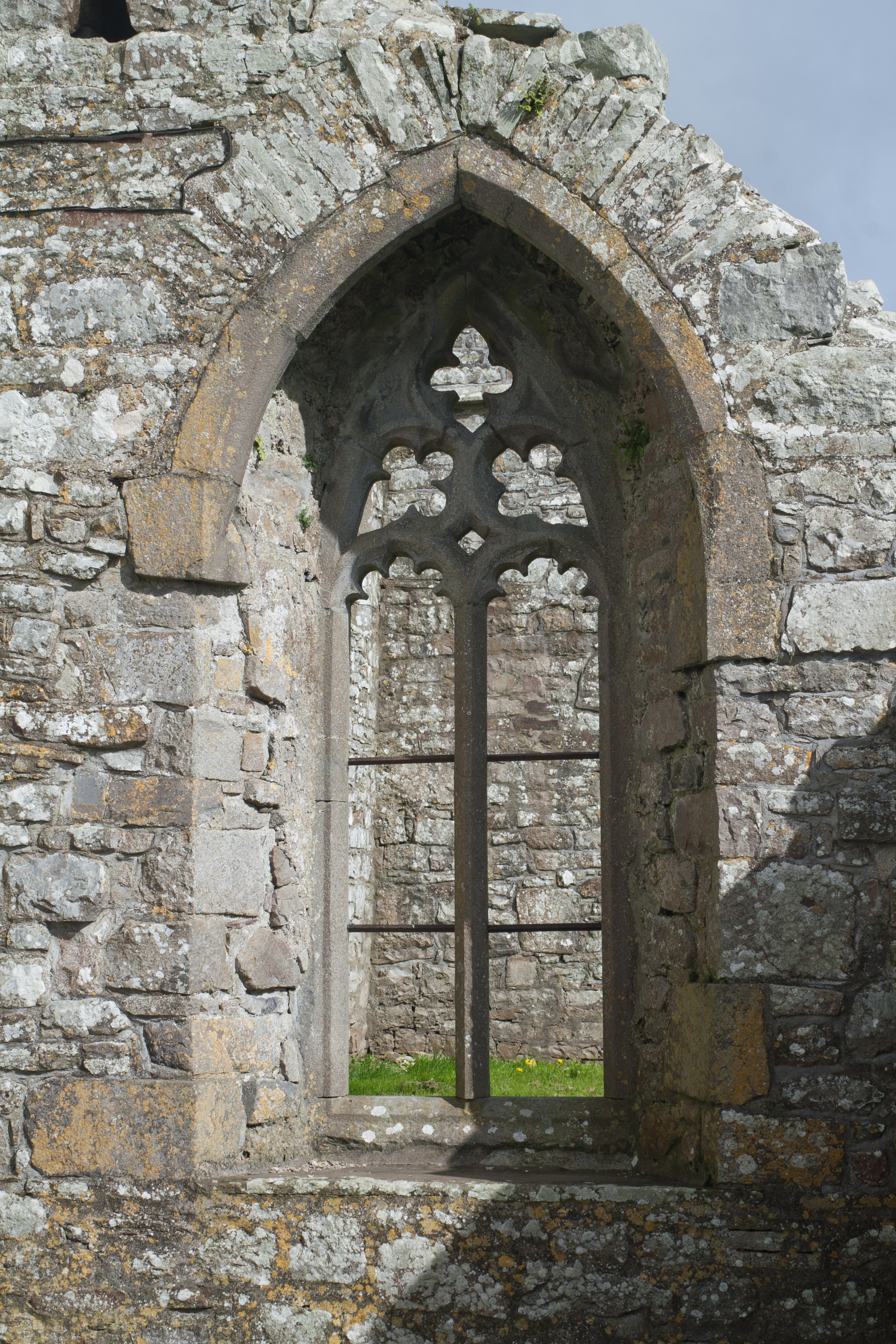
East window, south aisle

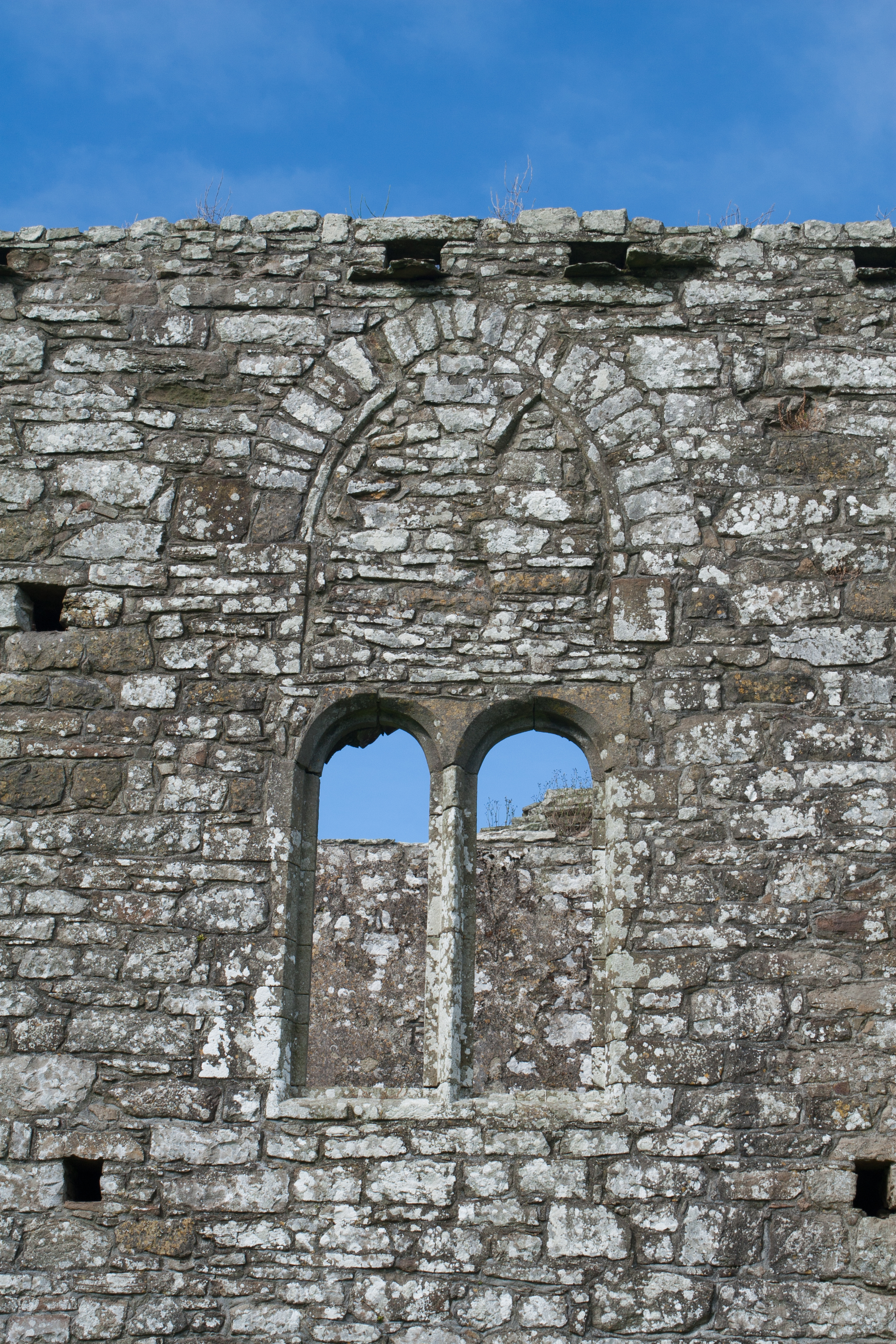
Window in south wall

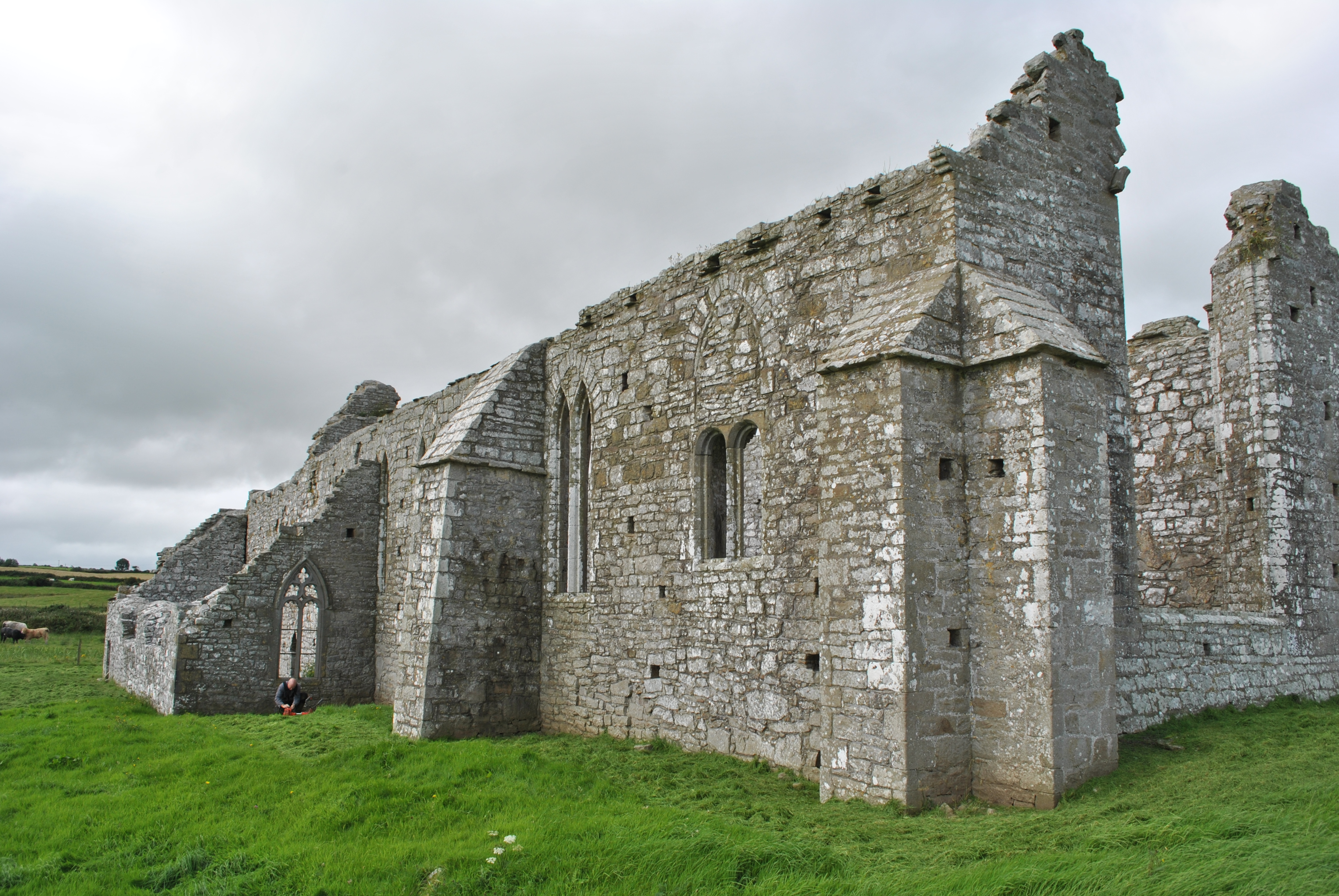
South Wall, exterior
