= Battle of Athenry =

The Battle of Athenry (Athenry, County Galway, Ireland) can refer to:

- First Battle of Athenry, 15 August 1249
- Second Battle of Athenry, 10 August 1316
