= Mac Siúrtáin =

Norman-Irish Clan

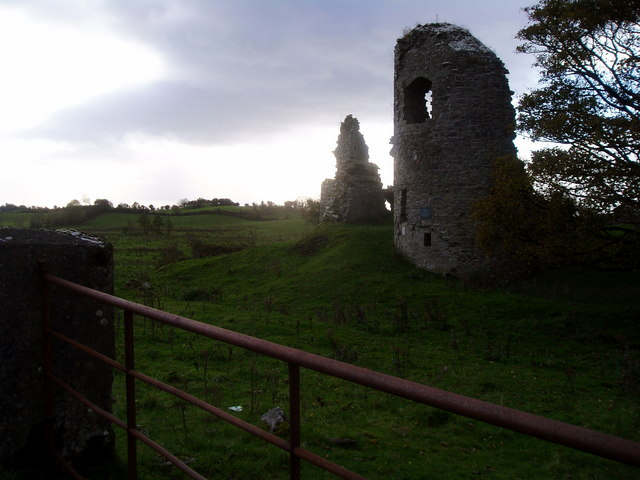
Ballylahan Castle, ancient seat of the Mac Siúrtáin.

Mac Siúrtáin, a.k.a. Mac Jordan and Jordan, is the name of a Connacht family of Norman-Irish origins.

== Ancestry ==
The family take their name from the Norman knight, Jordan de Exeter, whose descendants became known as Mac Siúrtáin - the Gaelic form of Jordan - and were based in County Mayo.

The de Exeter's were originally from the town of Exeter, Devon, and are recorded in Dublin and Meath from the 1230s onwards. They included Henry de Exeter, Mayor of Dublin c.1240-41; Michael d'Exeter, Bishop of Ossory 1289–1302; Richard de Exeter, killed 1287; Sir Richard de Exeter, died 1327; and Sir Stephen de Exeter, fl. 1280–1316.

== Mac Jordan of Gallen ==
The descendants of Jordan de Exeter settled in Connacht, mainly in what is now County Mayo. The territory they conquered, Gailenga (later known as the barony of Gallen), was the southern part of Luighne (also known as Sliabh Lugha), whose lords were the clan Ó Gadhra. The de Exeters expelled the Ó Gadhras into Coolavin, County Sligo, while the clan Ó hEaghra retained the name Luighne for their territory to the north.

Becoming steadily Gaelicised over a number of generations, the family as a whole were known as the Mac Siúrtáin (or Mac Jordan, i.e., the sons of Jordan). Only the chief of the clan was entitled to be called de Exeter.

John de Exeter/John na Conairte Mac Jordan is commonly believed to be the common ancestor of all Jordans of Connacht, except for a family called Mac Jordan Duff, descended from Jocelyn de Angulo.

== Chiefs of the Name ==
- John Mac Siúrtáin, died 1394.
- Thomas Mac Siúrtáin, fl. 1497.
- Thomas Dubh Mac Siúrtáin, died 1584.

== De Exeter family tree ==
 Stephen, dead by 1280.      Jordan, fl. 1239–58.              John de Exeter, died 1261.
=Johanna, alive 1280.       =Basilia, fl. 1253                 |
 |                           |                                 |
 |                           |___________________              Richard de Exeter, d. 1287.
 Sir Stephen, d. 1316        |                 |               |
=Matilda, fl. 1318.          |                 |               |_________________
 |                       Meiler, k. 1289.  Jordan Óge          |                |
 |                           |                 |               |                |
 Sir Stephen, fl. 1302.      |             ____|               Sir Richard    John, b.1270
                         Meiler, k. 1317. |    |               |
                                          |    |               |__________________
                            John na Conairte  Jordan Bacach    |             |
                                     |                         |             |
                                     |                         Simon     Richard of Derver
                            Clan Jordan of Mayo               fl.1335      fl. 1347.

== See also ==
- Jordan de Exeter
- Richard de Exeter
- Sir Richard de Exeter
- Sir Stephen de Exeter
- Jordan (name)
