= Francis Bermingham =

Irish friar and scholar

Francis Bermingham, O.F.M., fl. 1652, was an Irish Franciscan friar and scholar.

Bermingham was a descendant of Meyler de Bermingham (1275), the founder of Athenry.

Popularly known as Franciscus a Galvia (Francis of Galway), he was born there early in the 17th century. Upon joining the Franciscan Order as a young man, he was sent abroad to be educated. He taught philosophy at Milan and in Rome was Jubilate lecturer in Divinity at the College of St. Isidore, as well as serving as Definitor General of his Order. He was named amongst those Franciscan friars banished from their convent at Galway in 1652.

== See also ==
- Baron Athenry
- Basilia de Bermingham
- Second Battle of Athenry
- John de Bermingham, 1st Earl of Louth
- Thomas IV de Bermingham
- John Birmingham (astronomer)

== Bibliography ==
- De Sanctissima Trinitate, Rome.
