= Strade Abbey =

Monastery in County Mayo, Ireland

Straide Abbey
- Mainistir na Sráide
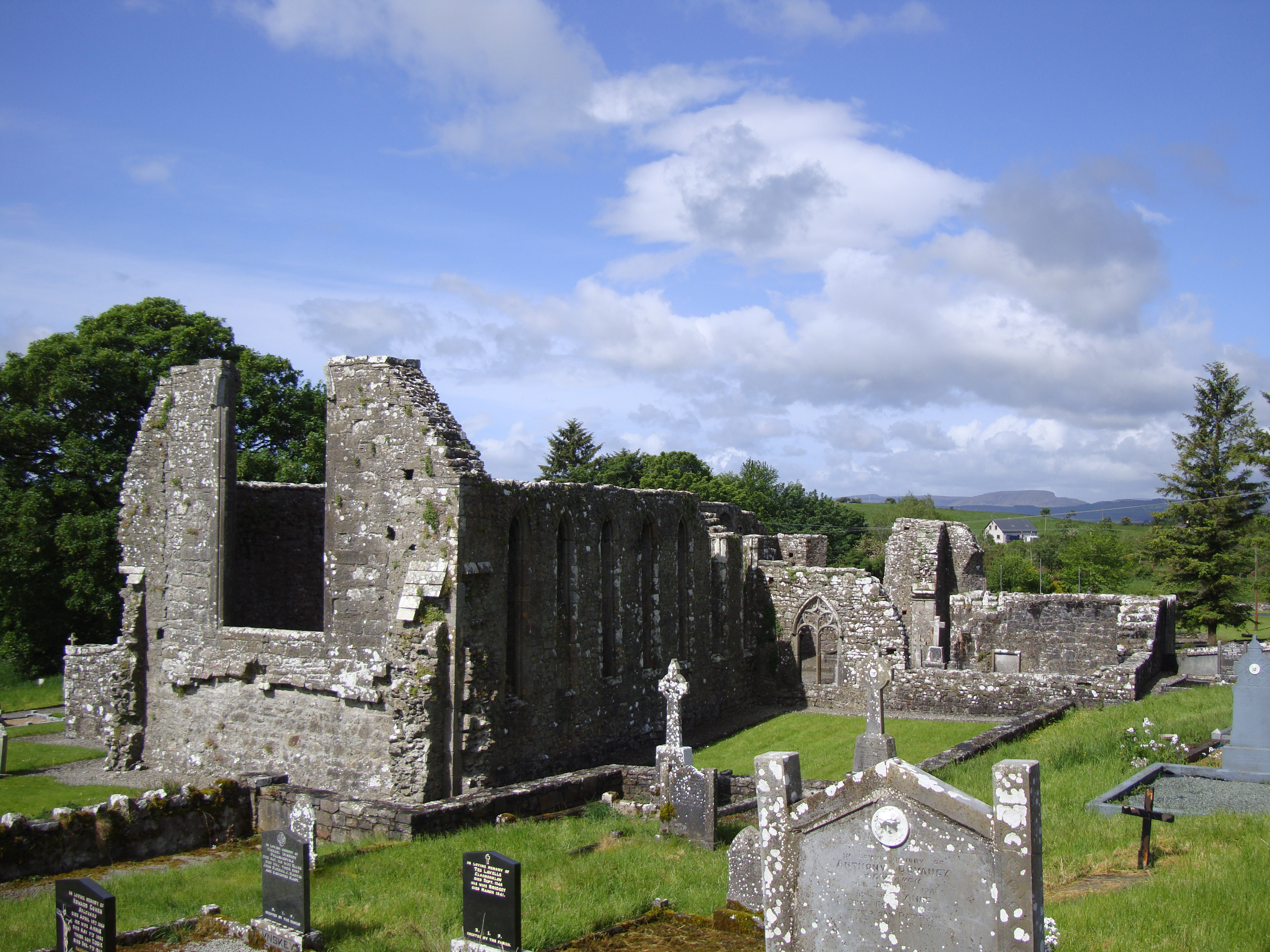

- Location within Ireland

Monastery information
- Other names: Straide Abbey; Abbey of Athletan
- Order: Order of Friars Minor (Franciscans); Dominican Order
- Established: c. 1240
- Disestablished: 1858
- Diocese: Tuam

People
- Founder: Jordan de Exeter

Architecture
- Status: ruined
- Style: Norman

Site
- Location: Strade, County Mayo
- Coordinates: 53.921478°N 9.128848°W
- Visible remains: Church
- Public access: Yes

Strade Abbey is a former Franciscan/Dominican monastery and National Monument located in County Mayo, Ireland.

== Location ==
Strade Abbey is located in the eastern part of Strade village.

== History ==
Strade Friary was founded c. 1240 by Jordan de Exeter, or his son Stephen, at the bequest of Jordan's wife Basilia, daughter of Meyler de Bermingham. It was inhabited by the Order of Friars Minor (Observant Franciscan Friars), before being refounded by the Dominican Order in 1252/53. It was burned in 1254.

In 1266, Thomas, bishop of Lismore, acknowledges to have ‘received at Athlone, on 2 July 1266, from Friar Henry de Siscle and Friar John Matugan [Madden], of the Dominican convent of Athletan [Straide], the sum of 28½ marks, Crusade money, collected by them and their brethren in their own district.

In 1434 Pope Eugene IV granted an indulgence to all who would give help towards the restoration of Strade Abbey.

Strade Friary was dissolved in 1578 and leased to James Garvey. In 1588 a lease of the abbey was granted to Patrick Barnewall for forty years.

In 1756, there were seven friars in Strade Abbey, and four in 1767. Fr. Patrick D. Kelly, the last of the friars of Strade, died c. 1858.

== Building ==
The buildings that remain are of the 13th–15th centuries, including a magnificent tomb in the north part of the chancel.

Strade Abbey
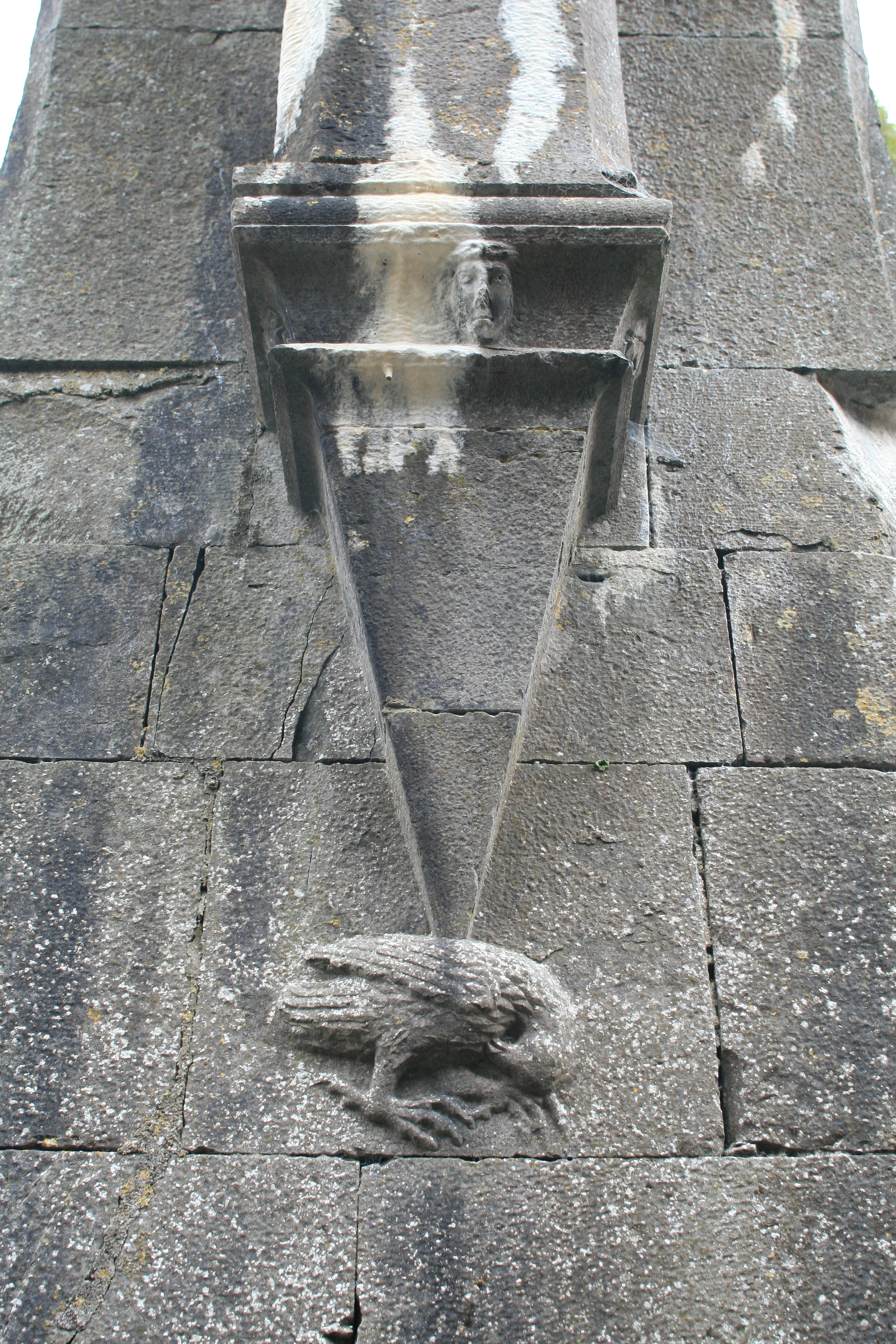
Relief of a pelican in connection with a corbel at the north pier of the chancel arch of Strade Priory. This carving was crafted c. 1440-1450

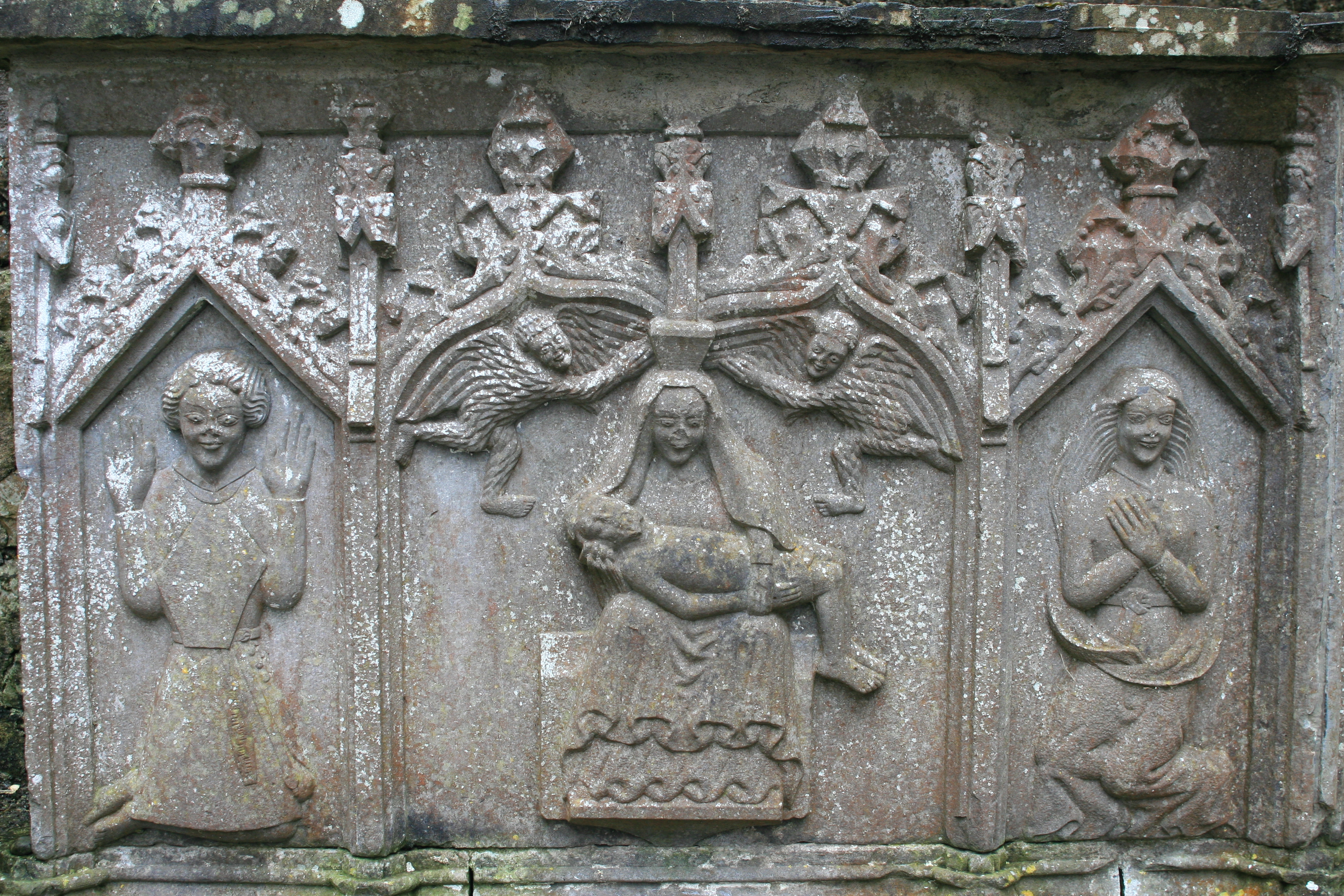
Relief at a tomb in Strade Friary

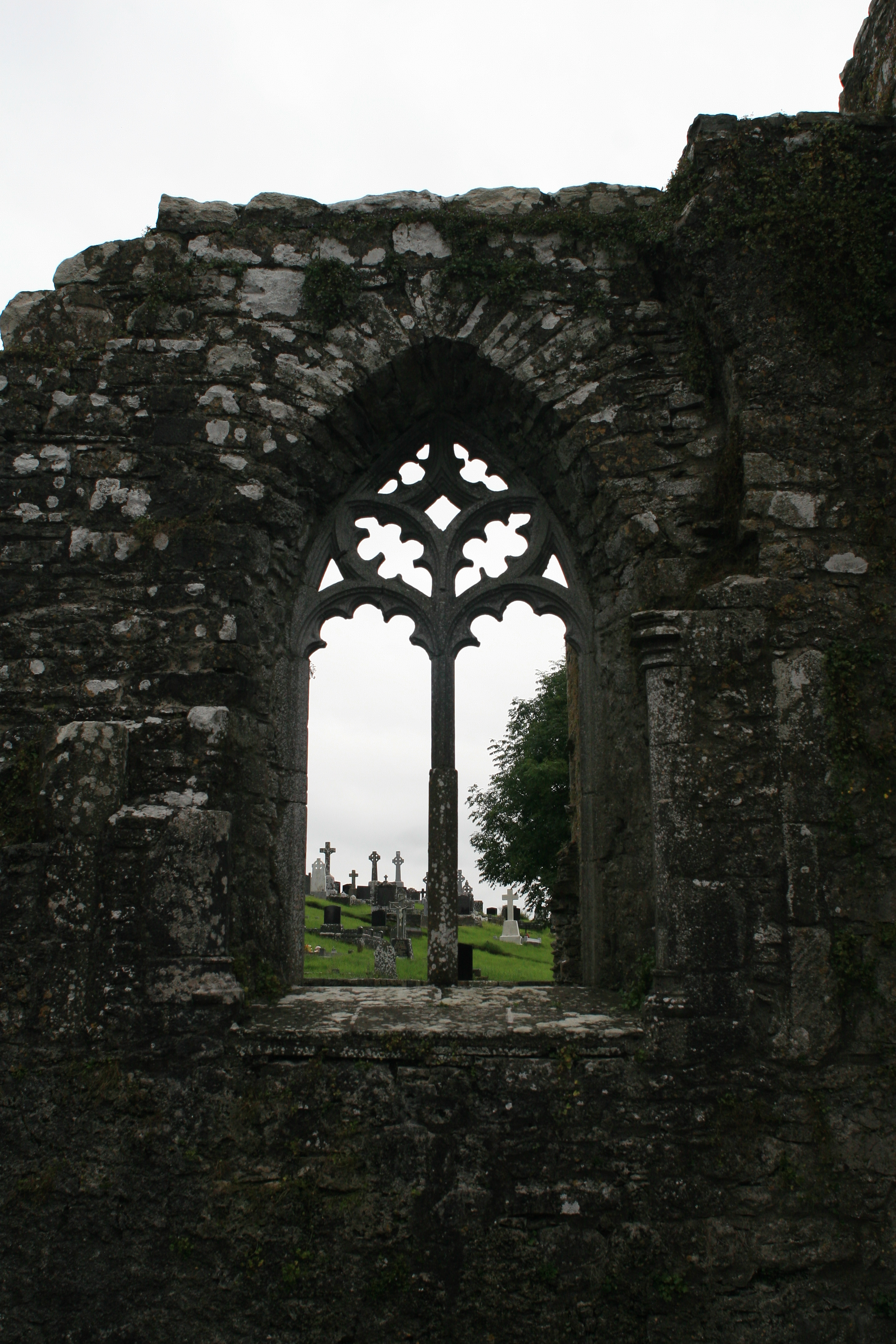
East window of the north transept of Strade Friary

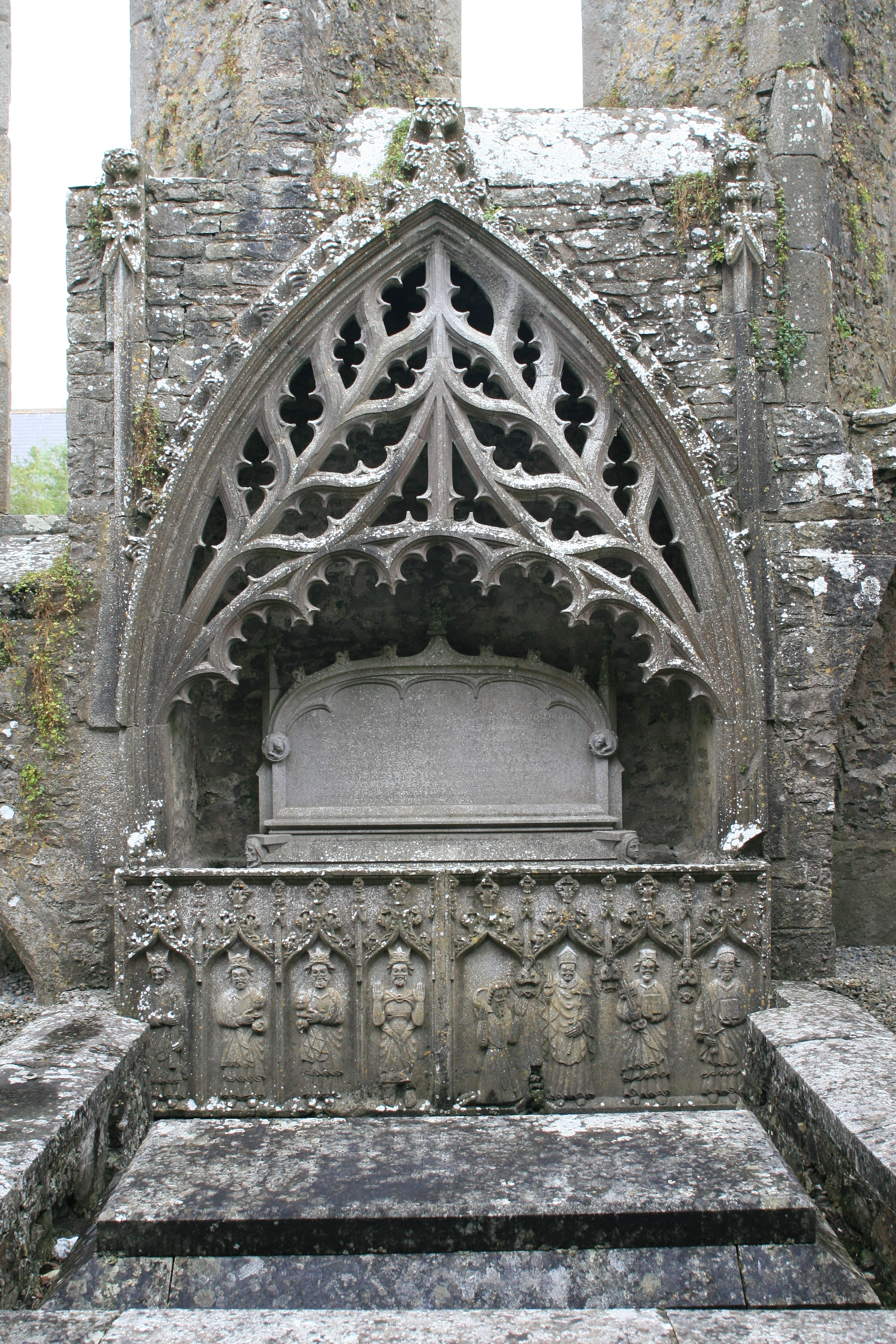
15th-century sculptured tomb in the north wall of the chancel of Strade Friary
