= Ballylahan Castle =

- Caisleán Átha Leathain (Irish)
- Ballylaghan Castle
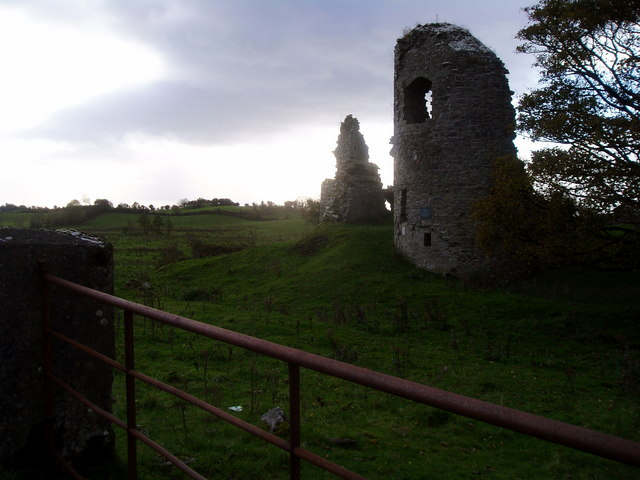

- Location within Ireland
- 53.934332°N 9.104869°W
- Type: tower house
- Location: Ballylahan, Strade, County Mayo, Ireland

History
- Built: 13th century

Site notes
- Height: 12 m (39 ft)
- Owner: State

National monument of Ireland
- Official name: Ballylahan Castle
- Reference no.: 325

Ballylahan Castle is a tower house and National Monument located in County Mayo, Ireland.

== Location ==
Ballylahan Castle is located 2.3 km (1.4 mi) northeast of Strade, on the south bank of the River Moy.

== History ==
This castle was constructed in 1260 by Jordan de Exeter, Sheriff of Connacht and was the ancient seat of the Mac Siúrtáin (MacJordans).

The castle came under attack in 1316 by the King of Connacht, Fedlim Ó Conchobair and was almost destroyed.

== Building ==
The main entrance was in the east and it was flanked by two circular towers, of which only one remains. The entrance gives access to an irregular hexagonal bawn. There is evidence of buildings particularly against the western wall. The bawn has some good base-batter, particularly at the northwest corner.
