= Battle of Ballyshannon =

The Battle of Ballyshannon may refer to a number of battles fought near Ballyshannon, Ireland:

- Battle of Ballyshannon (738), a battle in 738 fought between Áed Allán, High King of Ireland and Áed mac Colggen, King of Leinster
- Battle of Ballyshannon (1247), a battle in 1247 fought between Maurice FitzGerald, Justiciar of Ireland and Melaghlin Ó'Donnell, Lord of Tyrconnell
