= Jordan de Exeter =

Anglo-Norman Knight

Jordan de Exeter (1239–1258), alternatively known as Jordan d'Exeter, was an Anglo-Norman knight, Sheriff of Connacht, and ancestor of the Mac Siúrtáin/Mac Jordan clan.

== Life and family ==
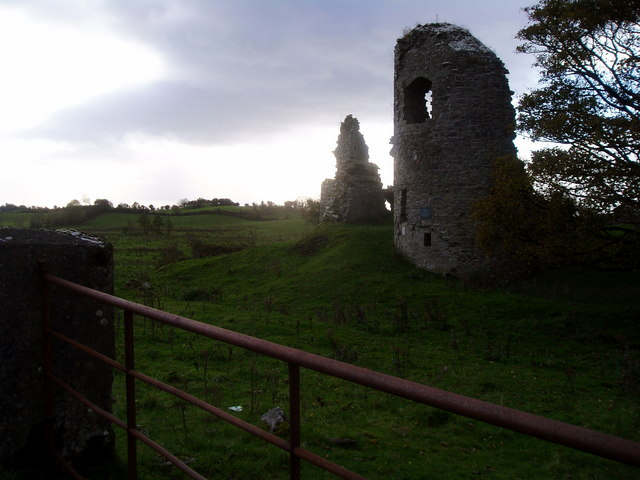
Ballylahan Castle, built by Jordan de Exeter in 1239.

De Exeter took his family name from the town of Exeter in Devon, England but it is not known if he or previous members of the family were the first in Ireland. He appears to have participated in Richard Mor de Burgh's conquest of Connacht in 1230s. De Burgh granted the barony or cantred of Gallen to Hugh de Lacy, who transferred it to Jordan de Exeter, who was in possession of it by 1239. In 1250 Henry III gave him twenty-five marks yearly "in reward of services until he should be given waste lands worth £20 a year, which were given about the parish of Killallaghtan in Galway, to be held by the service of one knight." (p. 307)

He built the castle of Ballylahan – now on the junction of the N58 and R321 in County Mayo. It overlooked Athlethan, or Strade, where he built an abbey for the Franciscans but at the behest of his wife, transferred it to the Dominicans in 1253.

His wife was Basilia de Bermingham, a daughter of Meyler de Bermingham, lord of Athenry. They had sons Meiler de Exeter (d. 1289) and Jordan Óge de Exeter (fl.1269–1319).

== Exploits ==
Jordan is first recorded in the Annals of Connacht in 1247, when:

A great war was waged by Toirrdelbach son of Aed O Conbhobair and Donnchad son of Anmchad son of Donnchad O Gillapatraic of Ossory against the Galls of Connacht. Toirrdelbach assembled the kings' sons of Connacht and they reached Fid O nDiarmata and Muinter Fathaig, where they killed some people, and passed on to Galway, where they burned the town and the castle and where very many people were killed, Donnchad O Gillaptraic of Ossory killing Mac Elgeit, the Seneschal of Connacht. The Galls followed them up and engaged them, and they killed a [further] number of Galls and escaped in spite of them, coming afterwards to Carra. Jordan D'Exeter and the children of Adam [Standon] and the Galls of Carra (Carra, County Mayo) assembled and moved against Toirrdelbach, but he left the country to them, not being strong enough to oppose them.

In the following year, 1248, the same annals state that:

The sons of Magnus, and the son of Conchobar Ruad made a hosting and revolted against the Galls. They burned Mac Henry's castle and captured its warden and carried the preys of North Umall onto the islands of Clew Bay. Then Jordan D'Exeter and John Butler and Robin Laigles and many others assembled and marched first to Ballintober and thence to Aghagower, and next day they plundered Umall, north and south. Then [Mac] Henry came into Umall with a great army, for Umall belonged to him and he lived there. However, he made peace with Domnall son of Magnus, who promised to supply him with men and ships to attack his [i.e. Domnall's own] kinsmen. Now they were on the Clew Bay islands, and it was told them that a body of men were on their way from Mac Henry to Domnall, to fetch boats. They went out against this company and Ouain mac na Gaillsighe and Seon mac in Gaillshacairt were killed, and in that conflict Diarmait son of Magnus killed Senoitt Guer and four of his followers. For this was a victory with defeat, since that valorous champion and well-tried warrior, Diarmait son of Magnus, was himself killed.

== Sheriff of Connacht ==
His most famous exploit was leading the cavalry charge that won the First Battle of Athenry in 1249. The Annals of Connacht relate that:

The kings' sons of Connacht made another hosting, to burn and pillage Athenry, at the feast of Mary in mid-autumn. They went thither, a great host, including Toirrdelbach son of Aed and Aed son of Aed, and the Sheriff of Connacht was there to meet them, with many Galls. The Galls asked for a truce on that day, on account of its sanctity; in honour of Mary Mother whose day it was. The princes would not grant that truce to honour Mary or the Crucifixion, but attacked the town, though Toirrdelbach was unwilling. When Jordan [D'Exeter] and the Galls saw this they issued from the town against the princes. Mary wrought a miracle then; for when the princes and their followers saw the horsemen in arms and armour making towards them, horror and dread seized them and they were put to flight. Aed son of Aed O Conchobair was killed there, and Diarmait Ruad son of Cormac O Mailsechlainn, O Cellaig's two sons, Brian of the Wood son of Magnus, Carrach Insiubail son of Niall O Conchobair, Baethgalach Mac Aedacain, Mathgamain son of Tadc son of Diarmait Bachlach O Conchobair, Lochlainn O Conchobair's two sons, Domnall son of Cormac Mac Diarmata, Findanach Mac Branain, Cu Muman Mac Casurlaig and many others."

Jordan himself was killed in 1258 while fending off a raid by Dubhghall mac Ruaidhrí:

A great fleet came from the Hebrides with Mac Somurli. They sailed round the west of Ireland into Connemara and robbed a merchant ship of all her goods; wine, copper, cloth and iron. The Sheriff of Connacht, Jordan d'Exeter, put out with a fleet full of Galls in pursuit of Mac Somurli and the fleet which had committed that piracy. Mac Somurli had landed on an island and drawn his ships up onto the land, and when they saw the Sheriff's fleet approaching he and his men put on their armour and fighting accoutrement. When the Sheriff reached the island he and his men, with those of the Galls who were ready with him, went quickly ashore. But he was met and dealt with by Mac Somurli and his men, being killed at once, together with Piers Accabard, an excellent knight of his company, and other good men. The fleet of the Galls retired after losing the best of their lords, and Mac Somurli went back to his land, joyful and laden with spoil.

== Family and descendants ==
De Exeter was the founder of the Mac Jordan, or Mac Síurtáin, family. The family held lands in the barony of Gallen in what is now County Mayo, later known as Tir Mac Síurtáin or Mac Síurtáin's Country. They became progressively Gaelicized over the succeeding generations, especially after the failure of the Norman colonies in Connacht. Their family name was anglicised to MacJordan and, in later times shortened to simply Jordan.

Preceded by William de Brit	Sheriff of Connacht c. 1247–1258	Succeeded by unknown
