= Peter de Bermingham (died 1308) =

Anglo-Irish landowner (??–1308)

Peter de Bermingham (died 1308) was the Anglo-Irish second lord of Athenry.

Peter was a son of Meyler, who founded the town of Athenry in Clann Taidg, County Galway. His eldest son, Myler, died in 1302 without male issue so the lordship devolved to the younger son, Rickard de Bermingham.

He seems to have been regarded by the English Crown as a reliable subject. A statute of the Irish Parliament of 1299 provided for him to be given extra troops to deal with "the Irish felons".

Myler's widow Joan remarried the prominent English-born judge Sir John de Fressingfield. She brought a lawsuit against Peter over her dower, which included Knockgraffon Castle in County Tipperary. Her date of death is not recorded: Sir John, who had returned to England, was still alive in 1322.

Peerage of Ireland
Preceded by Meyler de Bermingham	Baron Athenry	Succeeded by Rickard de Bermingham
