= John de Fressingfield =

English knight, judge and diplomat (died c. 1323)

Sir John de Fressingfield (c.1260-c.1323) was an English knight, judge, diplomat and Privy Councillor, much of whose career was spent in Ireland. Though he is almost entirely forgotten now, he was a figure of some importance in English and Irish public life in the first 20 years of the fourteenth century. He also held judicial office in Jersey and Guernsey.

His career is all the more remarkable since he came from an obscure family of peasant origin, and lacked powerful political connections. He had at least one son, and probably grandchildren, but his descendants seem to have died out within a few generations.

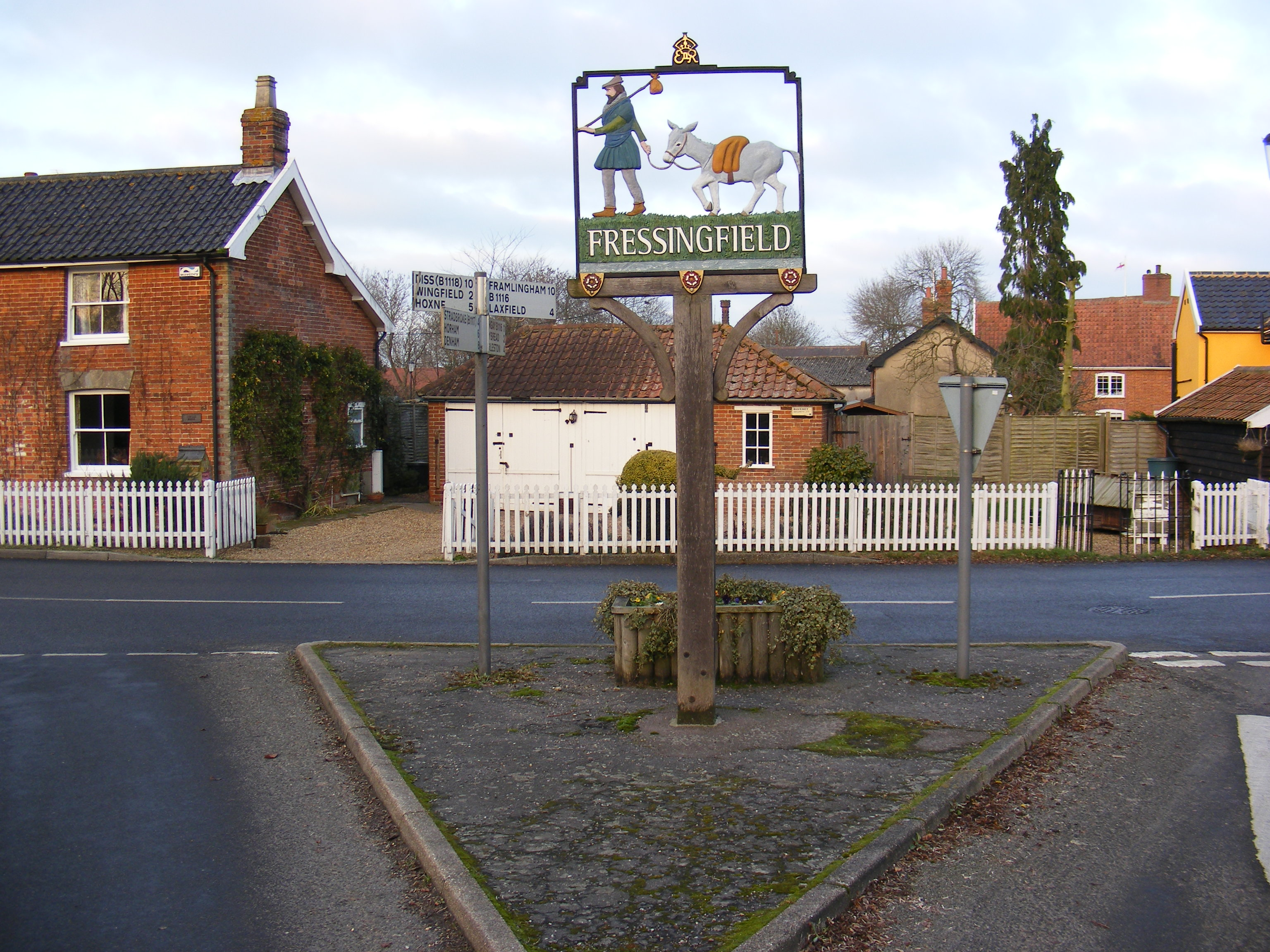
Fressingfield, Suffolk, present day: John was born here

== Background and early career ==
He was born at Fressingfield in Suffolk, son of Walter of Fressingfield and Levota, and grandson of Seman of Fesssingfield. Seman is said to have been a peasant, and Walter seems to have been a man without landed estates or influential connections, so John's rise in the world was due entirely to his own ability. He had dealings over property with Robert de Vere, 5th Earl of Oxford (died 1296), but there is no evidence that Oxford acted as his patron. Nothing is known of his education and in particular whether or not he attended university.

He somehow managed, despite his humble origins, to qualify as an advocate, and was arguing cases before the English Court of Common Pleas by 1294. The boundaries of the legal profession at this time were not rigidly set, and he acted at the same time as a senior court clerk in the Court of Common Pleas, then as clerk to the justices on the Northern circuit. While on the Northern circuit, he attracted the favourable notice of John Wogan, who was the junior justice on that circuit c.1293-4.

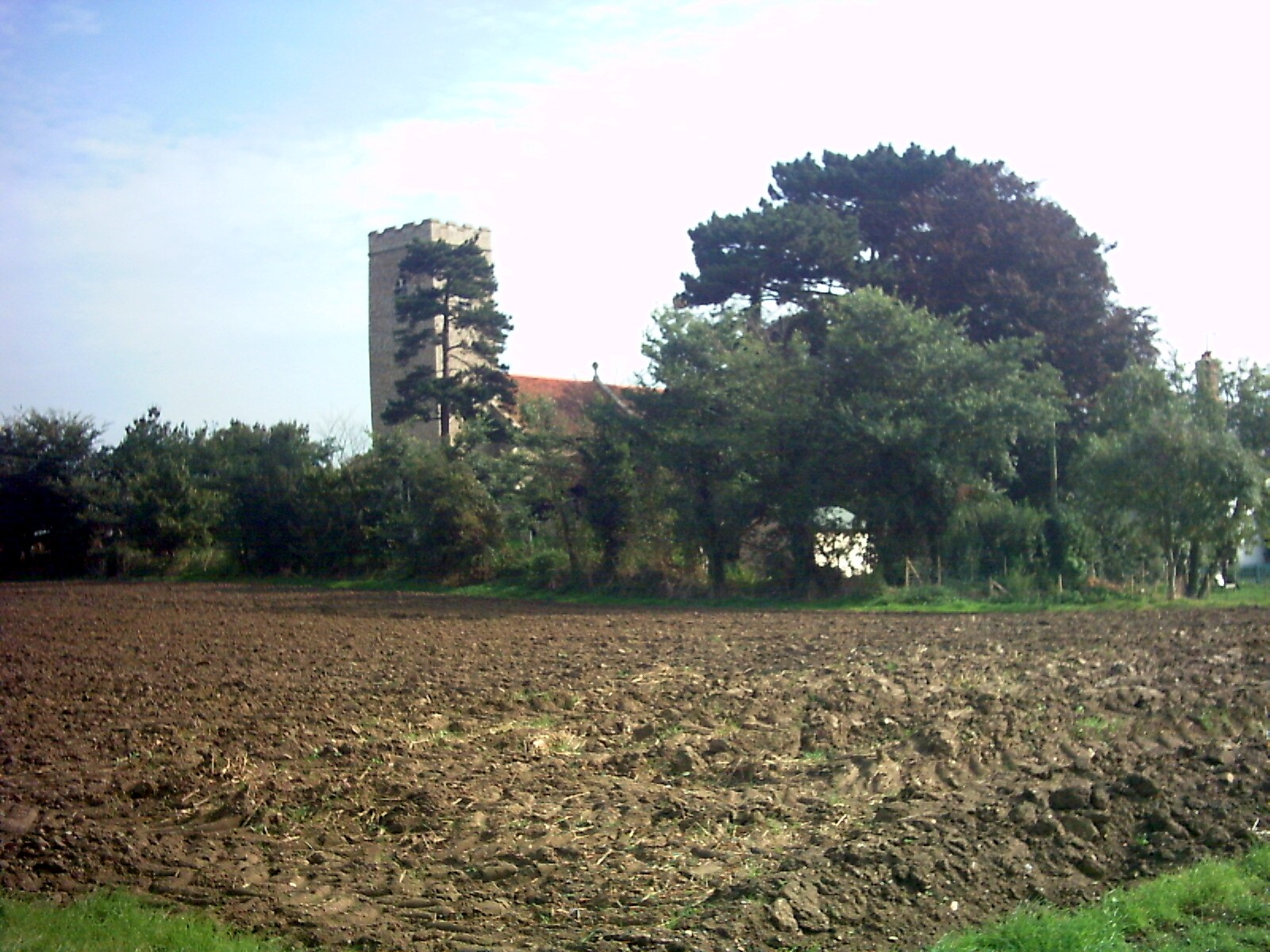
Cookley, Norfolk, one of the manors acquired by Fressingfield

== In Ireland ==
When Wogan was sent to Ireland to take up office as Justiciar of Ireland in 1295, John went with him, and quickly proved himself to be a valuable and versatile Crown servant. His first official position was Keeper of the Writs and Rolls of the Bench, as the Court of Common Pleas (Ireland) was usually called then. He was then appointed Constable of the castles of Athlone, Rindoon and Roscommon. A record survives for payment to him of £25, as part of his salary. Rindoon Castle and the adjoining town were utterly destroyed a few years later by the Irish clans of Roscommon, and never rebuilt.

He became a judge, sitting as Deputy Justice of the Court of the Justiciar, where he had previously acted as clerk, in 1301-2 and 1305-6. He was itinerant justice in County Tipperary in 1305-7. He saw military service in Scotland in 1301–2, and thereby gained the goodwill of King Edward I. He was knighted about 1307.

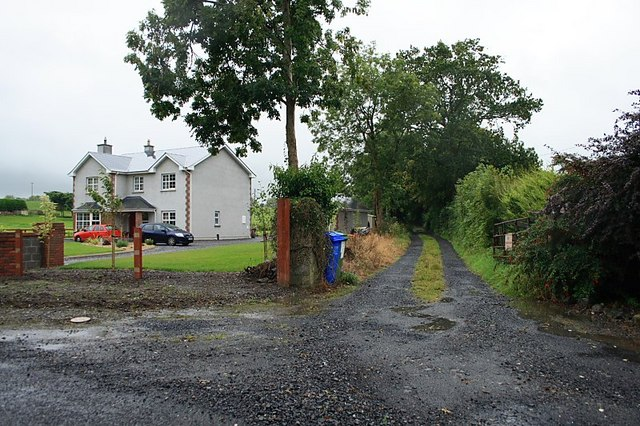
Lynn, County Westmeath, present day. Sir John had one of his principal Irish manors at Lynn

He became a landowner of some substance in both countries. In Suffolk, he acquired Mendham Hall from the Earl of Oxford, as well as the manor of Cookley, near Halesworth, and other lands in Norfolk. In Ireland he acquired manors in County Tipperary, at Lynn in County Westmeath (his principal Irish seat) and in Carlow, and the right to hold weekly markets on each of his manors. He applied for permission to endow a chantry at his manor of Lynn, which he had bought from the de Pitchford family, with what result is unclear.

His second marriage to Joan, widow of Meiler (or Myler) de Bermingham, a member of one of the leading Anglo-Norman families of Connacht, brought a considerable addition to his wealth, as her dower included lands in County Kildare and Connacht, and Knockgraffon Castle in Tipperary.

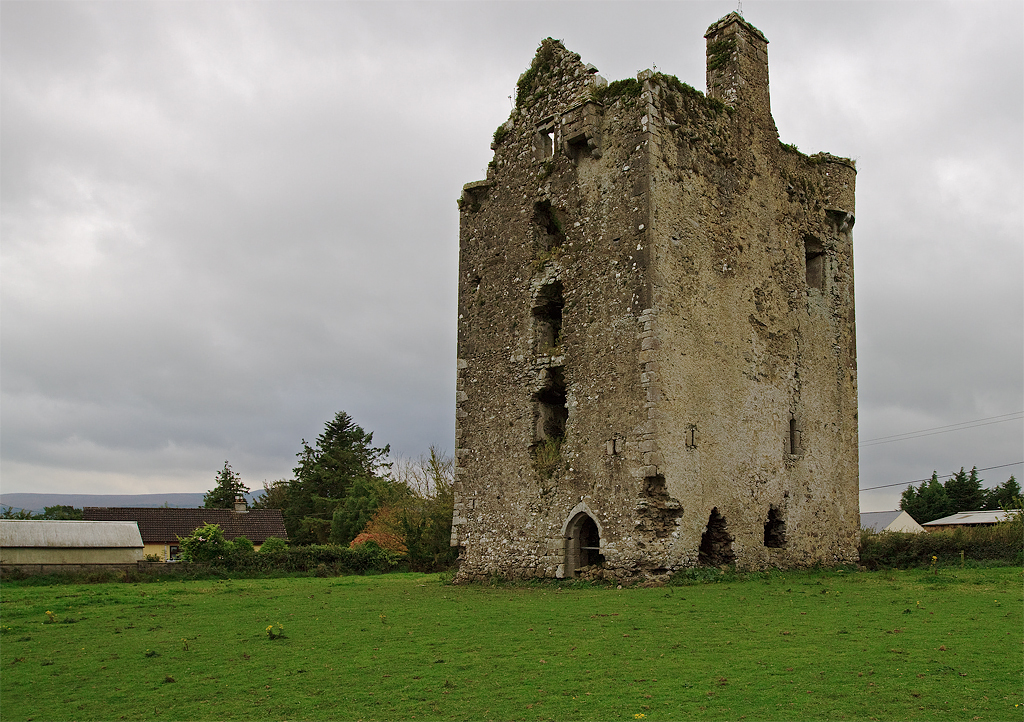
Knockgraffon Castle, Tipperary, which Fressingfield acquired as part of the dower of his second wife, Joan de Bermingham.

== Return to England ==
Despite many indications, especially his large-scale acquisition of lands in that kingdom, that he was planning to put down permanent roots in Ireland, he returned rather suddenly to England in 1308. Possibly he was hoping that the favour he had enjoyed in the previous reign would continue under King Edward II, preferably in the form of a permanent seat on the English Bench. This did not materialise, but for a decade his career in England flourished. He was appointed the most senior of the three justices in eyre in the Channel Islands in 1309. He sat on several commissions of oyer and terminer, mainly in London, Norfolk and Suffolk, and was sent on diplomatic missions to Gascony and to the Papal Court at Avignon. The high point of his career was being sworn a member of the Privy Council of England in about 1311, although he apparently only served on the Council for two or three years. He was summoned to Parliament in 1312 and 1313.

== Career in decline; last years ==
From about 1317 his career was clearly on a downward path: he had no influential patrons in England and had evidently lost touch with Wogan, who retired as Justiciar of Ireland in 1313. He never obtained the permanent place on the English Bench for which he had evidently hoped, and he was now advancing in years. He ceased to sit on judicial commissions and did not attend meetings of the Privy Council, of which he may no longer have been a member. He was now heavily in debt: he sold some of his lands and borrowed large sums of money which he could not repay, leading to litigation with his creditors.

No doubt in a last effort to restore his fortunes, he attached himself to the bitterly unpopular royal favourites, Hugh Despenser the Elder and his son Hugh Despenser the Younger, during the political conflicts of the early 1320s, but the result of this attempt to rehabilitate himself politically was a humiliating failure. In the fighting in South Wales which led to the Despencers' exile in August 1321 John, who had some military experience, was captured and imprisoned. In the following year, with the Despensers restored to royal favour, he was freed on payment of a ransom.

He seems to have died soon after his release, and certainly well before the final downfall and execution of the Despensers in 1326.

== Family ==
He married firstly, before 1294, Alice, who was English and probably died in 1301, and secondly, shortly after 1302, Joan de Bermingham, widow of Myler de Bermingham, whose dower lands brought him a considerable addition to his holdings, although it also involved the couple in a lawsuit with her first husband's father, Peter de Bermingham, Lord of Athenry. John had at least one son by his first marriage, also named John, who is recorded as acting for his father as his attorney, and he is also thought to have had at least one grandson (yet another John), but the family seems to have died out within a few generations.

== Sources ==
- Ball, F. Elrington The Judges in Ireland 1221-1921 London John Murray 1926
- Brand, Paul "A Versatile Legal Administrator and More: the career of John of Fressingfield in England, Ireland and beyond". Published in Smith, Brendan, editor, "Ireland and the English World in the Late Middle Ages- essays in honour of Robin Frame" Palgrave Macmillan 2009
- Hand, Geoffrey English Law in Ireland 1280-1324 Cambridge University Press 1967
