= William de Brit =

Sheriff of Connacht, Ireland (died 1247)

- Died: 1247 near Ballyshannon, Ireland
- Battles / wars: Battle of Ballyshannon

William de Brit, also known as William de Brett, was an Anglo-Norman Knight and Sheriff of Connacht until his death at the Battle of Ballyshannon in 1247.

Preceded by unknown	Sheriff of Connacht unknown–1247	Succeeded by Jordan de Exeter
