= Richard de Exeter =

Anglo-Irish knight and baron

Richard de Exeter, Anglo-Irish knight and baron, fl. 1261–1287.

Related to Sheriff Jordan de Exeter, and thought to be the son of one John de Exeter (who died in 1261). Much of what is known of Richard is derived from the Annals of Multyfarnham, which were compiled up to 1274 at the abbey of Strade, County Mayo, apparently by a Friar Stephen de Exeter. These annals relate the following:

- 1262 - Death of Eva, first wife of Richard de Exeter.
- 1264 - Death of Mabilia, his second wife.
- 1269 - Richard married Ysemain de Prendergast, daughter of David.
- 1270 - Birth of their son, John de Exeter.
- 1273 - Appointed Chief Justice of the Common Pleas.

T.H. Knox noted that he "formed a large estate about Athleague, and built a castle there, but neither he nor his son nor grandson lived there; they were officials." (p. 140)

He served as Deputy Justicier from about 1270 to 1276, and during the same term was Chief Governor of Ireland, 6 March 1270 to 6 November 1276.

He served as Constable of Roscommon and Rindown castles for the term 1282–84, and was killed in battle in Thomond in 1287. He was succeeded by his eldest son, Sir Richard de Exeter.
