= First Battle of Athenry =

13th century battle in Ireland

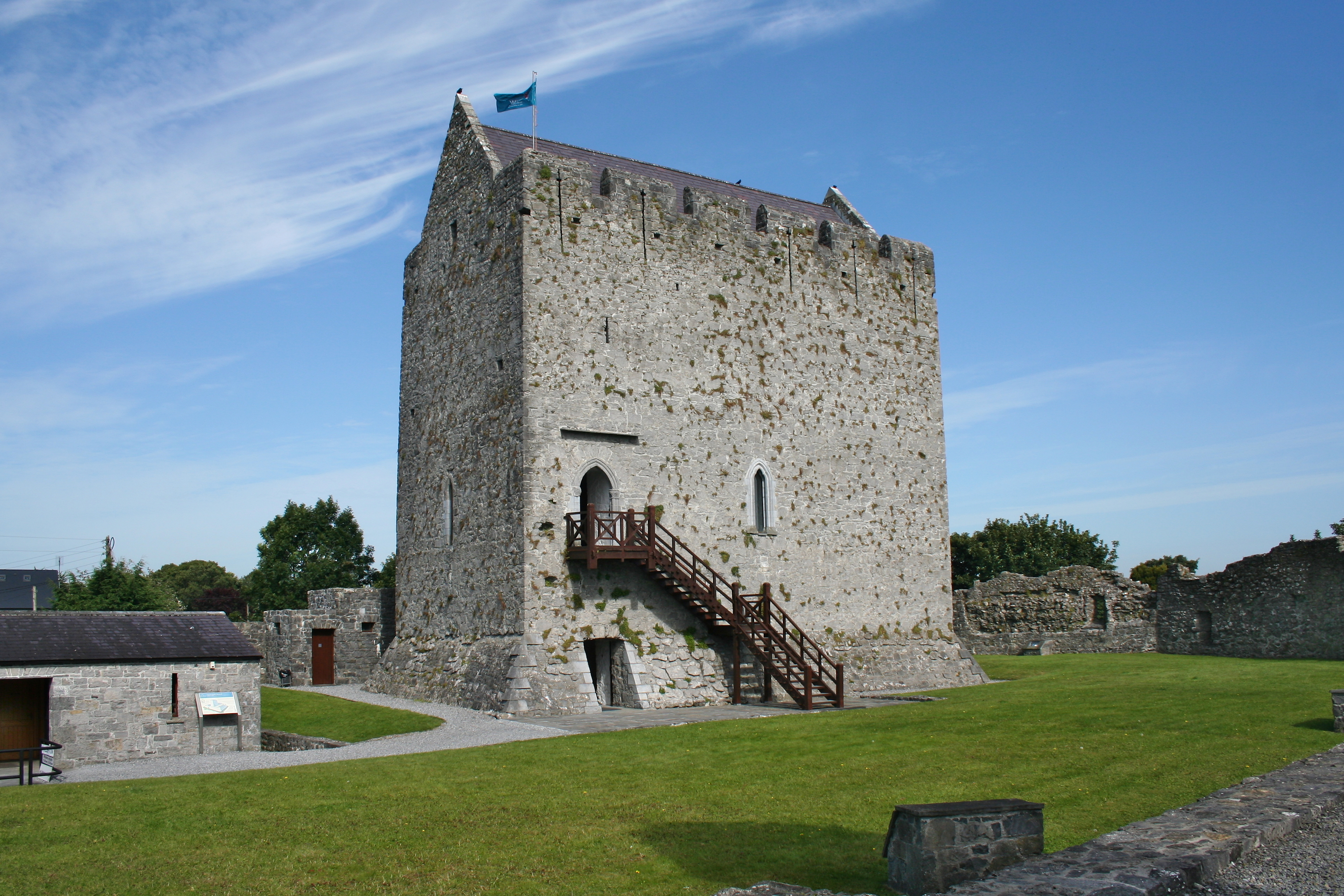
- Athenry Castle, built by the Normans in the early 13th century
Date	15 August 1249
Location	Athenry, County Galway, Ireland 53°19′N 8°45′W
Result	Anglo-Irish victory

Belligerents
Kingdom of Connacht	Lordship of Ireland

Commanders and leaders
Toirrdelbach Ua Conchobhair; Aodha Ua Conchobhair †	Jordan de Exeter
- Location of the battle in present day Ireland

The First Battle of Athenry was fought on 15 August 1249 at Athenry (Irish: Áth na Ríogh) in modern County Galway, Ireland. The Irish forces of Connacht besieged the town but were repelled by the English under Jordan de Exeter, Sheriff of Connacht.

Áth na Ríogh had existed as a Gaelic settlement under the Ó Mainnín kings of Soghain , but between 1236 and 1241 Meyler de Bermingham captured the area and made Athenry an urban walled settlement. Though by 1249 it featured a castle and Franciscan friary, it was still close to hostile Gaelic territory.

The contemporary Annals of Connacht give the following account of the battle:

The kings' sons of Connacht made another hosting, to burn and pillage Athenry ('co hAd na Rig'), at the feast of Mary in mid-autumn. They went thither, a great host, including Toirrdelbach son of Aed and Aed son of Aed, and the Sheriff of Connacht was there to meet them, with many Galls. The Galls asked for a truce on that day, on account of its sanctity; in honour of Mary Mother whose day it was. The princes would not grant that truce to honour Mary or the Crucifixion, but attacked the town, though Toirrdelbach was unwilling.

When Jordan and the Galls saw this they issued from the town against the princes. Mary wrought a miracle then; for when the princes and their followers saw the horsemen in arms and armour making towards them, horror and dread seized them and they were put to flight. Aed son of Aed O Conchobair was killed there, and Diarmait Ruad son of Cormac O Mailsechlainn, O Cellaig's two sons, Brian of the Wood son of Magnus, Carrach Insiubail son of Niall O Conchobair, Baethgalach Mac Aedacain, Mathgamain son of Tadc son of Diarmait Bachlach O Conchobair, Lochlainn O Conchobair's two sons, Domnall son of Cormac Mac Diarmata, Findanach Mac Branain, Cu Muman Mac Casurlaig and many others.

An almost word-for-word account is given in the contemporary Annals of Loch Cé, upon which the account in the Annals of the Four Masters, written in the 1630s, was based.

== See also ==
- Second Battle of Athenry

== Sources ==
- Martyn, Adrian, "The First Battle of Athenry", p. 10, East Galway News & Views, March/April 2008.
- Martyn, Adrian, The Tribes of Galway:1124–1642, Galway, 2016.
