= Battle of Ballyshannon (1247) =

Battle in 1247

- Part of the Irish-English conflicts
Date	1247
Location	Near Ballyshannon
Result	Anglo-Irish and allied victory

Belligerents
Kingdom of Tyrone; Kingdom of Tyrconnell; Kingdom of the Isles	Lordship of Ireland Kingdom of Connacht

Commanders and leaders
Melaghlin O'Donnell †; Rory MacDonald †	Maurice FitzGerald; William de Brit †; Cormac O'Connor

Strength
Unknown	Unknown

Casualties and losses
Unknown	Unknown

The Battle of Ballyshannon (Irish: Béal Átha Seanaidh) was fought in 1247 between Maurice FitzGerald, Justiciar of Ireland and Melaghlin O'Donnell, King of Tyrconnell, Kinel-Moen, Inishowen, and Fermanagh, near Ballyshannon, Ireland. Maurice FitzGerald defeated and killed Melaghlin O'Donnell.

== Timeline ==
The Annals of the Four Masters describes the battle as follows:

A great army was led by Maurice Fitzgerald, and the other English chiefs, first to Sligo, and thence to the cataract (Assaroe Falls) of Aedh Roe, the son of Badharn. Cormac, the son of Dermot, who was son of Roderic O'Conor, joined his muster. This was on the Wednesday after the festival of St Peter and St Paul. O'Donnell assembled the Kinel-Connell and Kinel-Owen against them, so that they did not allow a single man, either English or Irish, to cross the ford of Ath Seanaigh for a whole week. The English then bethought them of sending Cormac O'Conor with a large body of cavalry westwards along the plain, who was to turn southwards through the plain, and then eastwards along the borders of the bog, unperceived by any one, until he should arrive at Bel-atha-Culuain a ford on the Erne. This was accordingly done, and the Kinel-Connell knew nothing of the movement until they saw the body of cavalry advancing on their rear, on their side of the river; they then turned round to them. When the English saw that the attention of the Kinel-Connell was directed towards the cavalry who had advanced on their rear, they rushed across the ford against them, being confident that they the Kinel-Connell would not be able to attend to the attacks of both. The Kinel-Connell were now in the very centre of their enemies, who had surrounded them on every side. O'Donnell was slain on the spot, as well as the Cammhuinealach Wry-necked O'Boyle, the head Chieftain of the Three Tuathas, Mac Sorley, Lord of Argyle, and other chiefs of the Kinel-Connell. A great number of Fitzgerald's forces were slain and drowned here; others of them were drowned northwards in the River Finn, and many others at Termon Daveog, in pursuit of preys that fled before them; and among the rest William Britt, sheriff of Connaught, and his brother, a young knight. The country was then plundered and desolated by them the English, and they left the chieftainship of the Kinel-Connell to Rory O'Canannan on this occasion.

The Annals of Lough Cé describes the battle as follows:

A great hosting by Maurice Fitz-Gerald, and the foreigners along with him, until they reached Sligech in the first instance, and from thence to Es-Ruaidh-mic-Badhuirn, on the Wednesday after the festival of Paul and Peter; and Cormac, son of Diarmaid, son of Ruaidhri O'Conchobhair, went there in his host and muster.

O'Domhnaill assembled the Cenel-Conaill and Cenel-Eoghain to meet him at Bel-atha-Senaigh, so that they allowed neither Foreigners nor Gaeidhel to cross the ford during the space of a whole week; when they determined that Cormac O'Conchobhair should go, with a large force of cavalry, eastwards along the plain, and then turn upwards through the plain by the margin of the bog; and he then proceeded eastwards along the river until he reached Ath-Chuil-uaine on the Erne. And the Cenel-Conaill observed nothing until they saw them approaching on their own side of the river. And when the Foreigners perceived the Cenel-Conaill watching the cavalry in their rear, they themselves rushed across the ford, so that the Cenel-Conaill were placed between both divisions.

O'Domhnall was defeated, with his army; and Maelsechlainn O'Domhnaill, king of Cenel-Conaill, was slain there; and the Gilla-muinélach O'Baoidhill, and Mac Somhairle, king of Airer-Gaeidhel, and the nobles of the Cenel-Conaill besides, were slain. And many of Fitz-Gerald's army were drowned going northwards across the Finn and many of the same army were slain at Termann-Dabheog, in pursuit of the preys, including William Brit, i.e. the sheriff of Connacht, and a young armed knight who was his brother. However, the entire country was afterwards devastated and plundered by them; and they left the sovereignty of Cenel-Conaill with Ruaidhri O'Canannain on this occasion.
