= Stephen de Exeter =

Sir Stephen de Exeter was an Anglo-Irish baron and knight, fl. 1280–1316.

The son of one Stephen de Exeter (dead by 1280) and his wife Johanna (alive 1280), Sir Stephen was a member of the de Exeter family of Meath and Connacht in Ireland.

De Exeter and his mother filed a suit against one R. Fleming at Dublin in 1280. He is recorded as participating in the Meath inquisitions of 1290, the lordship in which he held land. He is also recorded as owning the manor of Dunreeghan in Erris, along with other places in County Mayo and at Athemethan, County Waterford.

He was killed at Athelehan (Strade) in 1316, and was described as its lord. He had a wife named Matilda (alive 1320) and a son, Stephen (alive 1302).

T.H. Knox believed that his father was the ancestor of the Mac Stephen clans of Gallen and Rathfran, possibly via the brothers Meilec and Thomas Duff, sons of Stephen de Exeter, which would make them brothers of Sir Stephen.
