= Sir Richard de Exeter =

Anglo-Norman knight, judge and baron

Sir Richard de Exeter (died 1327) was an Anglo-Norman knight and baron who served as a judge in Ireland.

== Biography ==
The son of Richard de Exeter (his father married three times, and his mother's identity is uncertain), Sir Richard held 'in capite' in Meath the lands of Straghcallan, Carrig, Listathell, Bryangston, Crowenbeg, Rathslyberaght. He had messuages, lands and rents in Rathbranna, Donneynin, Imelaghbegan and Le Newenhagard near Trim; the manors of Derver and Corbally; and an estate around Athleague in County Roscommon.

He seems to have held the manors of Barronnyston and Phelipyston de Nuget in right of his wife, Elizabeth.

During his career, he served as High Sheriff of Roscommon in 1292 and 1302, and keeper of Roscommon and Rindown castles in 1302 and 1304. He was summoned several times by Edward I of England to serve in the First Scottish War of Independence. He served as Chief Justice of the Irish Common Pleas during the latter part of his life, being appointed to the office late in 1302 on the death of Simon de Ludgate. There survives a report of at least one judgment he gave in the Easter term 1307, in which John le Petyt of County Meath and others were judged to have carried out a serious assault on the four sons of Sir Nicholas de Netterville (coincidentally a colleague of de Exeter in the Common Pleas), and were ordered to pay heavy damages.

In 1304 King Edward I of England asked him to re-examine a decision of the Common Pleas, delivered during the Chief Justiceship of Simon de Ludgate. The King asked for further information to be given to the Justiciar of Ireland regarding a decision of the Court to dispossess Joan de Munchensi, widow of William de Valence, 1st Earl of Pembroke, of her liberty of County Wexford, which had come to her as one of the Marshal co-heiresses.

In '"The Impact of the Bruce Invasion of Ireland" (A New History of Ireland, volume nine, pages 295–96) James Lydon notes that "During the war a petition asked for the removal of Richard d'Exeter, Chief Justice of the Common Bench, who was suspect because of his association with the rebel, Walter de Lacy, who had married his daughter, and with many other who were hostile to the king".

This Walter de Lacy was a prominent tenant of the English Crown in County Meath. He later fled to Ulster to join Edward Bruce and suffered forfeiture of his estates. No action was taken against de Exeter as a result, nor against his fellow judge Hugh Canoun, whose loyalty was also suspect, (Canon, however, was murdered by the de Bermingham family of Athenry shortly afterwards).

De Exeter died in 1327. A son, Simon de Exeter, also served as Chief Justice of the Common Pleas in 1335, while another son, Richard de Exeter, is recorded as owning the manor of Derver, Meath, in 1347. Of his daughters, one married Walter de Lacy, and another in 1312 married Milo de Verdun, brother and co-heir of Theobald de Verdun, 2nd Baron Verdun. He may have had a brother, Father Nicholas de Exeter, to whom he made a transfer of land in 1305.

== Notes ==
,
