= Jordan Óge de Exeter =

Jordan Óge de Exeter (fl. 1269–1319) was an Anglo-Irish knight and Sheriff of Connacht.

The younger son of Jordan de Exeter and Basilia de Bermingham, Jordan Óge first came to notice as Sheriff of Connacht in 1269, a post he held again in 1279. In 1280 he was Constable of Roscommon castle. Possessed of the cantred of Erris in Connacht, in the 1290s he held the barony of Athmethan, Waterford, from the King at a rent of £20 13s 4d. His first wife was Ismania, fl. 1302, "who seems to have been the heiress of a Christophre. Their son Jordan Bacach seems to have claimed lands in Cork through Ismania [he] does not appear in Connacht history. It may be inferred that he succeeded to his father's Munster estates, and John to the Connacht estates."

Jordan Óge became the heir of his nephew, Miler Fitz Miler de Exeter, upon the latter's death in 1317. He had two sons, John na Conairte de Exeter - described as the lord of Athelethan in 1335 and Jordan Bacach de Exeter.

Preceded by unknown	Sheriff of Connacht; 1269–1270; 1278–1280	Succeeded by unknown
