= Three Tuathas =

Historical kingdom in Ireland

The Three Tuathas (Irish: Na Teora Tuatha) was a name of a kingdom consisting of three kingdoms in County Roscommon, Ireland lying between Elphin and the River Shannon. It extended from Jamestown on the River Shannon to the north portion of Lough Ree. It was divided into three kingdoms known as Cenél Dobtha between Slieve Bawn and the River Shannon; Corca Achlann to the west and Tir Briuin na Sinna to the north. The O'Monaghan's and O'Boyle's were rulers of the Three Tuathas in the 13th century.

== Corca Achlann ==
Corca Achlann (The People of Achlann), was once ruled by the Mac Branáin, a Uí Briuin sept, and the O'Mulvihil.

=== Genelach M Branain from O'Clery Book of Genealogies ===
Concobhar, Conn, Diermait, Maghnus, et Muircertach: clann t-Sean m Echmharcaigh m Diermada m Eachmarcaigh m Cuinn m Eachmarcaigh m Branain (o Raiter m Breanain) m Duinn sithe m Murchada m Giolla crist m Echtigheirn m Aidit m Uromain m Mail michil m Nuadhat m Flaithniadh m Ona m Aenghusa m Erca deirg m Briain m Eachdach muidhmedhon.

=== Genelach mc. Branan from the Book of Ballymote ===
Diarmaid m. Echmarchaigh m. Diarmada m. Echmharchaig m. Cuind m. Echmharcaig m. Branan m. Gilla Crist m. Cuind m. Echmharcaig m. Branan m. Duindtsidhe m. Murcaidh m. Gilli Crist m. Echthigern m. Aidith m. Uramhan m. Mailmhichil m. Nuagad m. Flaithniadh m. Ona m. Aengusa m. Earca derg m. Briain m. Ecach mugmedoin.

=== Annal Entries ===
FM1088.8 mac Giolla Criost, mic Echtighern, toiseach Corcu Achlann.

FM1120.6 Branán mac Giolla Críost, taoiseach Corca Achlann, died.

FM1150.13 Diarmaid Mac Branáin, tigherna Corc' Achlann.

FM115.13, Branán Mac Branáin, toisech Corco Achlann.

=== Pedigree of O'Mulvihil from O'Hart's Irish Pedigrees ===
Maolmichiall, son of Dungal, son of Tuathal, son of Fionnbeartach, son of Endadaidh, son of Faelan, son of Columan, son of Maoin, son of Muireadach, son of Murchada, son of Eoghain, son of Neill of the nine hostages.

(O'Hart says the O'Mulvihil where driven from county Roscommon (later medieval period) by the O'Connors to the lands of O'Brien in county Clare.)

== Cenél Dobtha ==
Cenél Dobtha, Cenél Dofa or Doohy Hanly (Clann Dobtha), was once ruled held by the Ó hAinle (O'Hanly).

=== Genelach .H. Ainlighe from O'Clery Book of Genealogies ===
Lochlainn, Mail seclainn, Giolla na naem, Raghanll, et Cairpre riabach: clann Aedha m Conchobair m Domnaill m Iomair m Domhnaill m Amlaibh m Iomair moir m Muircertaigh (le frith an t-ech gel do bi ag Tadg ua Concobair) m Raghnaill catha briain m Murchada m Domnaill m Taidhg m Muircertaigh muirnigh m Ainlighe (o raiter muinter Ainlighe) m Urthuile m Maile duin m Cluitechair m Fuinis m Dothfa m Aengusa m Erca deirg m Briain m Echdach mugmedoin.

=== Genelach I Ainlighe from the Book of Ballymote ===
Aed & Imhar da mc. Concubair m. Domnaill m. Imhair m. Domnaill m. Amlaim m. Imhair mhoir m. Muircertaig le frit i tuac geal Taidhg m. Concubair m. Ragnaill catha Briain m. Murchada m. Domnaill m. Taidg m. Muircertaigh muirnigh m. Ainlidh o fuilet I Ainlidhe m. Uthaile m. Maeladuin m. Cluichechair m. Fuinis m. Dobhtha m. Aengusa m. Erca derg m. Briain m. Echac muigmedoin.

== Tir Briuin na Sinna ==
Tir Briuin na Sinna, Uí Briúin na Sionna or Tir Briuin na Shannon (The land of Shannon), was once ruled held by the O'Monaghan and the O’Beirne.

=== H. Maenachan of Clann Ona mc. Aenghusa in the Book of Ballymote ===
H. Maenachan is one of the families said to descend from Ona m. Aenghusa m. Earca derg m. Briain m. Echach mugmedoin

=== Genelach I Birnn from the Book of Ballymote ===
Tadg m. Donnchada m. Domnaill m. Gilli Crist m. Imhair m. Gilli Crist m. Mathgamhna m.

=== Genelach hI Bern from An Leabhar Donn ===
Domnall ocus Uilliam Dondchad & Tadcc Cairpri & Feradach Dunadach & Rosa & In Gilla Dub clann Mailechlainn m. Briain m. Taidc m. Dondchada m. Domnaill m. Gillacrist m. Imair m. Gillacrist m. Mathgamna m. Gillacomain m. Imair m. Gillananaem m. Domnaill m. Gillacrist m. Conconnacht m. Muircertaig m. Ciaba Gorma m. Muircertaig m. Birnn m. Cinaetha m. Ubain m. Uatach m. Aeda bailb m. Indrachtaig m. Muiredaig Muillethain

== Citations ==
2. "Genealogies from the Book of Ballymote" transcribed by Luke Stevens.

3. "Selected genealogies from An Leabhar Donn" RIA MS 1233 (23.Q.10) transcribed by Luke Stevens 2003.
