= Rickard de Bermingham =

Anglo-Irish lord (died 1322)

Rickard de Bermingham (died 1322), otherwise Rickard Mac Fheorais, was Anglo-Irish lord of Athenry.

== Family background ==
Rickard is reckoned third lord of Athenry and Dunmore, both in County Galway. He was a grandson of Meyler de Bermingham, the founder of Athenry. He was the chief tenant in south Connacht of Richard Óg de Burgh, 2nd Earl of Ulster, whose demesne lands stretched from the port town of Galway to Meelick on the River Shannon, de Burgh's caput been the town of Loughrea.

Despite his ethnic background, de Bermingham and his family are always described in the Gaelic-Irish annals as Mac Fheorais, indicating his descent from Peter (Piarus, a quo Fheorais) de Bermingham. The identity of Rickard's mother is uncertain though it is thought she was Gaelic.

This may explain why the family were regarded as at least semi-Gaelic by bards and seanchai so early in their history. Alternatively, the appellation Mac Fheorais may have begun with Peter of Tethmoy, father of Rickard's grandfather, Meyler de Bermingham.

Rickard is described in Leabhar na nGenealach as:

Risteard na gCath [=of the battles] – the battle of Ath na Riogh [=Athenry], the battle of Cnoc an Tochair [=Knocktopher] and the battle of Fionnlugh

== Lord of Athenry ==
He succeeded his father, Peter, around 1309. He had land around the Moy in northern Connacht, but his main estate laid between Dunmore and Athenry in what is now County Galway, the caput of the lordship been based at the latter town. Immediately due east was the Gaelic kingdom of Uí Maine, which had only been lightly settled by the Anglo-Irish, mainly along the border between it and the lordship.

In 1310 he obtained a murage charter, to enable him to enclose Athenry in stone walls. When finished, they enclosed over one hundred acres (40 ha) on the west bank of the Clarin River, making it one of the largest walled towns in Ireland. Over two-thirds of the walls still remain, almost unique for a town in medieval Ireland and Great Britain. Some six round watchtowers were included in the walls, most of which survive in some form, two exceptionally well-preserved.

He also extended and raised Athenry Castle. When work was completed c. 1315, it stood over three stories and had a vaulted roof, thought to be slated as thatch would make it vulnerable to lighting, fire arrows, and accident. It was situated at the north edge of the town, overlooking the Tuam and Monivea roads. It was abandoned by Rickard's descendants c. 1550, but the stonework survived almost intact. It was refurbished and re-roofed in 1990 and is at present open to the public.

Finally, he incorporated the Clarin into the town moat, and built a number of tower gates along the wall. The total number is uncertain but it is thought there were around four. Only one partially restored gate, the North Gate, now survives, though it may date from as much as one hundred years later.

== Connacht Wars of 1315–16 ==
During the Connacht Wars of 1315–16 (an offshoot of the Irish Bruce Wars 1315–1318, de Bermingham defended the Anglo-Irish colony in Connacht against Ruaidhri O Conchobair, who was supported by Prince Edward Bruce in his wish to become King of Connacht. Ruaidhri defeated the then king, Fedlim Ó Conchobair, who turned to the Anglo-Irish such as de Bermingham for help.

A coalition of Gaelic and Anglo forces defeated and killed Ruaidhri at the battle of Mullach Fidicci in north Galway, in January 1316. De Bermingham was wounded, how seriously is unknown.

After the battle, Fedlim betrayed his Anglo-Irish allies. He began destroying their settlements, killing their inhabitants and stealing their goods, his ultimate aim was to exterminate the entire colony and re-establish an independent Connacht kingship, and later, establish himself as King of Ireland. Due to the ongoing warfare with Edward Bruce in Meath and Leinster, no help was forthcoming and the Anglo-Irish of Connacht were left to fend for themselves. Famine had broken out the previous year and its effect exacerbated the situation.

== Second Battle of Athenry ==
Sir William Liath de Burgh had been captured at the battle of Connor in 1315 and had been held hostage in Scotland. Sometime in early, the Earl of Ulster obtained his release. De Burgh arrived back in Connacht with new forces and made his way to Athenry to support de Bermingham. Upon hearing of this, King Fedlim broke off a march towards Roscommon, assembled an army estimated as much as eight thousand, and marched towards Athenry, intending to raze it to the ground.

The exact circumstances surrounding the events, and location, of the Second Battle of Athenry are obscure. All that can be said with certainty is that it was fought somewhere very close to the town on 10 August 1316, and the Gaelic-Irish forces were comprehensively defeated. John Clyn states that one thousand five hundred heads were collected from the battlefield and sent to Dublin for bounty. Among the dead were King Fedlim and Tadhg Ó Cellaigh, King of Uí Maine. Their heads were afterwards set on pikes on either side of the town gate. This image is still the coat of arms of Athenry.

Due to a falling-out with King Fedlim, Muirchertach O Brian, Prince of Thomond, defected at some point and aided de Bermingham and de Burgh in defending the town. He became undisputed king of Thomond in 1318. In the same year, Rickard's kinsman, John de Bermingham of Offaly, fought and defeated Edward Bruce at Faughart, for which he was made Earl of Louth.

Local tradition holds that a soldier prayed for deliverance at Lady's Well, one mile east of the town, on the day of the battle, and was rewarded with a vision of the Virgin Mary. The soldier may have been Rickard de Bermingham.

== Children ==
Rickard was succeeded by his son Thomas in 1322.

Another son, Risteard Ruadh, is listed by Dubhaltach Mac Fhirbhisigh as an ancestor of "The family of Feorus of Clar Cairbre", giving a descent for a Eabhard Mac Feorais from An Charraig s. Baitear s. Seaan over thirteen generations inclusive, though part of the pedigree is faulty.

A third son, Andrew, became notorious for murdering the Royal judge Sir Hugh Canoun, against whom he had a grievance, near Naas, County Kildare, about New Year of 1318. Andrew in his turn was murdered in 1323, in the course of a feud with the O'Nolans.

One Baitear mc Risder an Chatha is given in the same work as the ancestor of a line whose pedigree is given as Thomas s. Risteard an Bhealaigh s. Maoilir Buidhe s. Thomas Og (or Dubh) s. Thomas na Feasoige [=of the beard] s. Baitear s. Risteard an Chatha. They are listed as of Dunmore, County Galway.

== Select genealogy ==
 Peter (Piers) of Tethmoy, d. 1254
 |
 |__________________________ William de Worchester, fl. 1230.
 |      |       |         |                      |
 |      |       |         |                      |
 James Andrew Maurice Meyler de Bermingham= Basilia de Worchester
 |                                              |
 |                                              |_______________________________________
 John de Bermingham, 1st Earl of Louth          |              |                       |
                                                |              |                       |
                                                Peter Basilia William, Archbishop of Tuam
                                               =Ni Cellaigh?  =Jordan de Exeter d. 1309
                                                |              |                       |
                                                |              |                       |
                                             Rickard   Jordan Óge de Exeter Simon
                                               =?             d.1319 d. 1329.
                                                |
                                                |________________________________________________
                                                |      |                  |                     |
                                                |      |                  |                     |
                                                Myler Thomas, d. 1375 Risteard Ruadh Baitear (Walter)
                                               d.1302. |              (Bermingham of Carbury) (Bermingham of Dunmore)
                                                       |                (in County Sligo) (in County Galway)
                                                       Walter, d.1428
                                                       |
                                                       |
                                                       Thomas, d.1473, from who descended the later Lords Athenry.

Peerage of Ireland
| Preceded by Peter de Bermingham | Baron Athenry c. 1309 – 1322 | Succeeded by Thomas de Bermingham |

== See also ==
- Baron Athenry
