= Meyler de Bermingham =

Anglo-Irish lord (??–c.1275)

Meyler de Bermingham (d. before 1275) was an Anglo-Irish lord, founder of Athenry.

== Ancestry ==
Meyler was a great-grandson of Robert de Bermingham who is said to have obtained a grant of Offaly from Strongbow or Henry II about 1172. Robert's son (Meyler, killed 1211) and grandson (Peter, died 1254) were both described as of Tethmoy, which is thought to have been the baronies of Warrenstown and part of Coolestown. Peter de Bermingham had sons James, Andrew, Maurice and Meyler.

== Athenry ==
Peter and Meyler participated in the Norman invasion of Connacht in the 1230s, Peter obtaining Dunmore in County Galway and Tireragh in County Sligo.

Meyler himself made a separate settlement in an area called Clann Taidg, and founded a castle by the River Clarin at a ford called Áth na Rí (ford of the kings, or kingdoms). This became the town of Athenry.

== Family ==
Meyler married Basilia de Worcester of County Tipperary, and had issue Peter (d. 1309?), Basilia de Bermingham, and William (Archbishop of Tuam, died 1309). Two of the latter's sons, Will Finn de Bermingham and Simon de Bermingham, were killed with their cousin John de Bermingham, 1st Earl of Louth during the Bragenstown Massacre in 1329.

Peter de Bermingham survived Meyler till as late as 1309, and had issue, Meyler (died 1302) and Rickard de Bermingham, who defeated King Fedlim of Connacht at the Second Battle of Athenry. Rickard's eldest son, John, was also killed at Bragenstown but was succeeded by his brother, Thomas de Bermingham.

== Descendants ==
Meyler's senior descendants ceased with the death of Thomas, 19th Lord Athenry, in 1799, but the name is still common in Galway via junior branches. Among his descendants were philosopher Francis Bermingham and astronomer John Birmingham.

== Select genealogy ==
Available evidence indicates that Myler's ancestor could have been one Richard, alive in 1066 and recorded as holding four hides of land at Birmingham as a Knight-service in 1086 for William fitz Ansculf. The descent is uncertain; the family may have been descendants of fitz Ansculf via the Pagnall family. The following family tree is based on their presumed descent from Richard of Birmingham (fl. 1066–1086). If true, it may indicate the family to be of English rather than Norman origin.

 Richard, alive 1066–1086
 |
 |
 William de Birmingham, fl. 1100–1135
 |
 |
 Peter de Birmingham, fl. 1154–1166.
 |
 |
 William, fl. 1172–1189.
 |
 |_________________________
 |                       |
 |                       |
 Peter, fl. 1213/1215 Robert of Tethmoy, fl. 1172.
 |                       |
 |                       |
 William, fl. 1250.      Myler of Tethmoy, died 1211
 |                       |
 |                       |
 William, d. 1265.       Peter of Tethmoy, d. 1254
 |                       |
 |                       |_________________________ William de Worchester, fl. 1230.
 William, fl. 1283–97    |      |       |        |       |
 |                       |      |       |        |       |
 |                       James Andrew Maurice Myler = Basilia de Worchester
 William, fl. 1305                                     |
 |                                                     |______________________________________
 |                                                     |              |                      |
 William, fl. 1325                                     |              |                      |
 |                                                     Peter Basilia William de Bermingham
 |______________________                              =Ni Cellaigh?  =Jordan de Exeter d. 1309
 |                     |                               |              |                      |
 |                     |                               |              |                      |
 Fulk, fl. 1340–67 William Rickard Jordan Oge Simon
 |                     |                               d. 1322 d.1319 d. 1329.
 |____________         |                               |
 |           |      William                            |
 |           |    fl. 1441–79 Thomas, d. 1375
 John Thomas       |                               |
 fl. 1397              |                               |
                William, fl. 1449 Walter, d.1428
                       |                               |
                       |                               |
               Edward, d. 1538 Thomas, d.1473.

== See also ==
- De Birmingham family

Preceded by New creation	Baron Athenry	Succeeded by Peter de Bermingham
