= Second Battle of Athenry =

1316 battle of the Bruce Campaign in Ireland

- Part of the Bruce campaign in Ireland
Date	10 August 1316
Location	Athenry, County Galway 53°18′38″N 8°44′53″W
Result	Anglo-Irish victory

Belligerents
Kingdom of Connacht; Kingdom of Thomond; Kingdom of Breffny	Lordship of Ireland and Gaelic allies

Commanders and leaders
Feidhlimid mac Aedh Ó Conchobair †; Tadgh mac Domhaill Ó Cellaigh †; Donnchadh Ó Briain; Ualgarg Mór Ó Ruairc	Rickard mac Fheorais de Birmingham; William Liath de Burgh; Muircheartaigh Ó Briain

Strength
Unknown	Believed to be over 1,100

Casualties and losses
Thought to be less	Up to 3,000 killed according to the Regestum of the Dominicans in Athenry
- Location within island of Ireland

The Second Battle of Athenry (/æθənˈraɪ/ ath-ən-REYE) took place at Athenry (Irish: Áth na Ríogh) in Ireland on 10 August 1316 during the Bruce campaign in Ireland.

== Overview ==
The collective number of both armies are unknown, and can only be estimated. Martyn believes the royal army to have been as much as or more than a thousand, while that of Athenry was probably several hundred less. The list of deceased participants on the Irish side alone indicates that exceptionally high numbers were involved.

== Outcome ==
Unlike the First Battle of Athenry in 1249, no surviving account gives the date of the battle itself. Even the site of the battle itself is uncertain.

Rickard de Bermingham and William Liath de Burgh led an Anglo-Irish force to victory. John Clyn states that "According to common report a sum of five .... thousand in all [were killed] the number decapitated was one thousand five hundred."

The battle was a devastating defeat for the Connacht Gaels, who were allied with the Scotsman Edward Bruce. Among those killed were kings Fedlim Ó Conchobair and Tadhg Ó Cellaigh King of Uí Maine.

In 2016, Martyn wrote that:

Though various Uí Chonchobair were Rí Connacht till 1477, prospective recovery of the overkingdom died with Fedlimid at Athenry. The real beneficiaries were among the ostensible losers, the kings of Tuadhmhumha, Uí Maine, and Uí Fhiachrach Muaidhe. Within decades each was successfully reconstituted as independent kingdoms, existing as such for the next two hundred and fifty years. Descendants of their leading lineages survive as titled aristocracy today.

The heads of King Fedlimid of Connacht and King Tadhg of Uí Maine were mounted over the town's main gate. This image remains the coat of arms of Athenry today.

== Annalistic accounts ==
=== The Annals of Ulster ===
The Annals of Ulster give the following account (U1313, recte 1316):

A great hosting was undertaken by Feidhlimidh, together with the nobles of the Fifth of Connacht and with Donnchadh O'Briain, king of Munster and O'Mael-Sheclainn, king of Meath and Ualgharc O'Ruairc, king of Breifni (Ualgharc O'Ruairc took the kingship that year) and O'Ferghail, king of Muinter-hAnghaile and Tadhg O'Cellaigh, king of Ui-Maine and Maghnus, son of Domnall Ua Concobuir, tanist of Connacht and Art O'hEaghra, king of Luighni and Brian O'Dubhda, king of Ui-Fiachrach.

They went, all those, to Ath-na-righ. The Foreigners of the West of Connacht all assembled against them: to wit, William de Burgh and the Baron Mac Feorais Birmingham, lord of Ath-na-righ and all the Foreigners of the greater part of the Half of Conn. Battle was engaged in by them and defeat inflicted on the Gaidhil there. Feidhlimidh O'Concobuir (son of Aedh, son of Eogan), king of Connacht, was slain there: the one person on whom the attention of the Men of all Ireland was most directed and who was best in generosity and prowess.

Tadhg Ua Cellaigh, king of Ui-Maine, was slain there and eight and twenty of the Clann-Cellaigh that had right to kingship of Ui-Maine were slain there. Art O'hEghra, king of Luighni was slain there. But for one thing, there was not slain in this time in Ireland the amount that was slain there of sons of kings and of chiefs and of many other persons in addition. Ruaidhri, son of Donnchadh, son of Eogan Ua Concobuir, was then made king by the Connachtmen.

=== The Annals of Loch Cé ===
After winning the battle of Tóchar-móna-Coinnedha (Templetogher, County Galway), on 25 January,

Fedhlim afterwards plundered the favorites of Ruaidhri O'Conchobhair, and then assumed himself the sovereignty of Connacht from Es-Ruaidh to Echtghe. And he seized the territory of the Uí-Briuin-Breifne, and took choice hostages from them, and made Ualgharg O'Ruairc kingover them; and he took the hostages of Clann-Cellaigh, and O'Madadhain, and Uí-Diarmada, and O'hEghra, and O'Dubhda.

And he afterwards went to expel the Foreigners of the West of Connacht; and Baile-Atha-lethain was burned by him, and Stephen de Exeter, and Miles Cogan, and William Prendergast, and John Staunton, were slain there, (viz., these were noble knights); and William Laighleis was slain there, and a countless multitude [along with them].

And the entire country was plundered and burned by him, from the castle of the Corran to Rodhba, both church and territory; and he returned home afterwards with gladness, and with great spoils. And they went forthwith to Milic-na-Sinda, to meet the people of Leth-Modha; and he burned and demolished the castle of Milic; and Muirchertach O'Briain, king of Tuadh-Mumha, went into his house there, the descendants of Brian Ruadh being opposed to each other. And he turned back to Ros-Comain, to demolish it. And when Fedhlim heard that William Burk had arrived in Connacht from Alba, he commanded a muster of his people to one place, to expel him. And this was the muster that came there, viz., all from Es-Ruaidh to Echtghe.

And Donnchadh O'Briain, king of Tuadh-Mumha, came in his following and muster; and O'Maelechlainn, king of Midhe; and O'Ruairc, king of Breifne; and O'Ferghail, king of Conmaicne; and Tadhg O'Cellaigh, king of Uí-Maine, and many more of the sons of kings and chieftains of Erinn, came in his muster.

And they all went to Ath-na-righ, against William Burk, Mac Feorais, and the other Foreigners of Connacht; and a battle was fought between them at the door of the town, and the Gaeidhel were defeated there, and Feidlilimidh O'Conchobhair, king of Connacht, and undisputed heir presumptive to the sovereignty of Erinn, was slain there, and Tadhg O'Cellaigh, king of Uí-Maine, and twenty-eight persons entitled to the sovereignty of Uí-Maine, fell there along with him; and Maghnus, son of Domhnall O'Conchobhair, tanist of Connacht; and Art O'hEghra, king of Luighne; and Maelechlainn Carrach O'Dubhda and Muirchertach, son of Conchobhar O'Dubhda; and Conchobhar Og O'Dubhda; and Diarmaid Mac Diarmada, who was fit to be king of Magh-Luirg; and Muirchertach, son of Taichlech Mac Diarmada; and Muirchertach, son of Diarmaid, son of Ferghal; and Maelechlainn Og Mac Maghnusa; and John, son of Murchadh O'Madadhain; and Domhnall, son of Aedh O'Concennainn, king of Uí-Diarmada, and his brother Muirchertach along with him; and Murchadh O'Madadhain; and Domhnall O'Baighill; and Donnchadh O'Maelmhuaidh, together with his people; and the son of Murchadh Mac Mathghamhna, and one hundred of his people along with him; and Niall Sinnach, king of Feara-Tethbha, with his people; and Ferghal, son of John Gallda O'Ferghail; and William, son of Aedh Og O'Ferghail; and Thomas, son of Amhlaibh O'Ferghail.

And five of the Clann-Donnchaidh were also slain there, viz. Tomaltach, son of Gilla-Christ Mac Donnchaidh, and Murchadh Mac Donnchaidh, and Conchobhar son of Tadhg, and Muirchertach and Maelsechlainn Mac Donnchaidh.

And John Mac Aedhagan, O'Conchobhair's brehon, and Gilla-na-naemh, son of Dal-redochair O'Dobhailen, the standard bearer, and Thomas O'Conallan, were slain there around their lord. And not alone this; but it is not easy to tell all that were then slain of Momonians and Meathians, and of the men of Erinn likewise, ut dixit the poet:

- Many of the men of Erin all, around the great plain—
- Many sons of kings, whom I name not, were slain in the great defeat:
- Sorrowful to my heart is the conflict of the host of Midhe and Mumha.

On the day of St. Laurence the martyr these deeds were committed; and Fedhlimidh was twenty-three years old when slain; and he had been five years in the sovereignty of Connacht when Ruaidhri, son of Cathal Ruadh, assumed it in opposition to him during the space of half a year; and he was another half year after Ruaidhri in the sovereignty until he was slain in this battle of Ath-na-righ.

== See also ==
- History of Ireland
- Irish battles
