= Strade =

Village in County Mayo, Ireland

Straide An tSráid
- Village
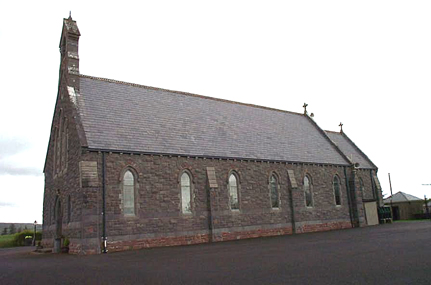
- Roman Catholic church, Straide

- Location in Ireland
- Coordinates: 53.921°N 9.131°W
- Country: Ireland
- Province: Connacht
- County: County Mayo
- Elevation: 20 m (66 ft)

Population (2006)
  - Total: 570
- Time zone: UTC+0 (WET)
  - Summer (DST): UTC-1 (IST (WEST))
- Irish Grid Reference: M255969

Straide (Irish: An tSráid), or Strade, is a village in County Mayo, Ireland. It is located on the N58 national secondary road between Foxford and Castlebar. The name Strade is an anglicisation of the Irish words an tsráid, meaning the street.

Straide Abbey has a number of carved reliefs on its ruined walls.

George Moore (1727–1799), who founded the Moore Hall estate at Lough Carra, came from Ashbrook House near Strade.

A museum in the village records the story of Michael Davitt who was born in Strade, and how he and Charles Stewart Parnell formed the Land League at the end of the nineteenth century to abolish landlordism in Ireland and enable tenant farmers to own the land on which they worked.

== See also ==
- List of towns and villages in Ireland
