= Ó Cormacáin =

Surname of Gaelic-Irish origin

Ó Cormacáin is a surname of Gaelic-Irish origin.

== Overview ==
Ó Cormacáin was mainly found west of the Shannon, in Connacht. The Ó Cormacáin ecclesiastical family were based in Síol Anmchadha, in what is now southeast County Galway.

There were at least three or possibly four septs of this name, located in what is now County Galway, County Roscommon and County Down.

The surname is now anglicised as Cormican.

Bears of the name included:

- Ua Corcrain of Clonfert, Bishop of Clonfert, d. 1094.
- Maelcoluim Ua Cormacain, Abbot of Aran, died 1114.
- Muirchertach Ua Carmacáin, Bishop of Clonfert, 1195–1203.
- Uilliam Ó Cormacáin, Archbishop of Tuam, 5 May 1386 – 1393.
- Henry Ó Cormacáin, last Abbot of Clonfert, fl. c.1534-c.1567.

== See also ==
- Cormac mac Connmhach, scribe, d. 867.
- Cormac mac Ceithearnach, died 881.
- Cormac mac Ciaran, Abbot, died 879.
