= Maelcoluim Ua Cormacain =

Abbot of Aran

Maelcoluim Ua Cormacain (died 1114) was an Abbot of Aran.

Ua Cormacain is one of the few named successors to Enda of Aran, dying early in the reign of King Tairrdelbach Ua Conchobair of Connacht. He may have been a member of the Ó Cormacáin ecclesiastical family based in Síol Anmchadha, in what is now southeast County Galway.

Since the 18th and 19th century the name has been rendered as Ó Cormacáin, Cormacan, and Cormican.

== See also ==
- Ua Corcrain of Clonfert, Bishop of Clonfert, d. 1094.
- Muirchertach Ua Carmacáin, Bishop of Clonfert, 1195–1203.
- Uilliam Ó Cormacáin, Archbishop of Tuam, 5 May 1386–1393.
- Henry Ó Cormacáin, last Abbot of Clonfert, fl. c.1534-c.1567.

Preceded by Flann Ua Aedha	Abbot of Aran ? - 1114	Succeeded by Gillagori Ua Dubhacan
