= Terence Óg MacDonagh =

Terence MacDonagh

MP Sligo Town
- In office May 1689 – August 1689
- Monarch: James II

Personal details
- Born: c. 1640
- Died: c. 1713
- Resting place: Ballindoon Friary
- Spouse: Eleanor O’Rourke
- Occupation: Soldier; poet; barrister; Member of Parliament
- Nickname(s): ‘Counsellor MacDonagh’, ‘Turlough Óg’ or ‘Tirlough Caoch’

Military service
- Allegiance: Jacobite
- Rank: Lieutenant Colonel

Terence MacDonagh of Creevagh, Co. Sligo (c. 1640–1713), known as the ‘Counsellor MacDonagh’, ‘Turlough Óg’ or ‘Tirlough Caoch’, was a Catholic Irish landowner, soldier, poet, Jacobite, Member of Parliament, and barrister.

== Early life and family ==
Terence MacDonagh, also known as ‘Turlough Óg’ or ‘Tirlough Caoch’ (one-eyed), was born in 1640 to Mary and Terence (Turlough) MacDonagh. His maternal grandfather was the poet Tadhg Dall Ó hUiginn. Despite the turbulent times of the early seventeenth century, the MacDonagh family managed to retain their lands. Records concerning MacDonagh's formative years are scarce, but he served overseas as a lieutenant in the army of Charles II during the 1650s. Following the restoration of the monarchy in 1660, MacDonagh returned to Ireland.

== Legal career ==
Upon his return, MacDonagh was given lands in Gallen, County Mayo, as a reward for services to compensate for his family's losses under the Cromwellian regime. MacDonagh later bought back the family estate at Creevagh, around the village of Kilmactrany in County Sligo from the Cromwellian awardee. In the 1660s, he embarked on a legal career, joining the Middle Temple in 1683 under the name ‘Terence Donno’ of Creevagh. Renowned for his legal acumen, he earned the moniker ‘one-eyed’ due to his handling of a case involving the accidental blinding of a boy. He was appointed King's Counsel under James II. Additionally, he served as a burgess of Sligo town following the borough reforms initiated by the Earl of Tyrconnell in 1687.

== Military service and political involvement ==
In 1688, MacDonagh enlisted in James II's army and for two years served as commander of a detachment of Dillon's regiment at Ballymote Castle. He later commanded a force against Gustav Hamilton and the Enniskilleners, and they were taken prisoner. They were subsequently exchanged for prisoners captured by Patrick Sarsfield. MacDonagh represent Sligo in the Patriot Parliament in 1689. After the session ended, he returned to his unit at Sligo, and was promoted to lieutenant-colonel. He participated in the siege of Derry in September 1689 and was present at Limerick.

== Later life ==
After the war, MacDonagh resumed his legal practice with permission granted under the terms of the Treaty of Limerick. Nevertheless, he was of constantly under suspicion by the government resulting in his internment in 1692 and 1708. He faced accusations from figures like the priest-catcher Edward Tyrrell of harboring Catholic priests, including his brother-in-law, Rev. Thaddeus O'Rourke, Bishop of Killala, but was never charged inder the Banishment Act.

His legal wranglings safeguarded his family estates and famously represented Denis O'Conor (1674-1750) of Belanagare, in county Roscommon, in securing the O'Conor estates. Most of his clients from the 1690s on were Catholics.

Outside his legal pursuits, MacDonagh was a poet, composing scathing critiques of his brothers and neighbors for conforming to the Church of Ireland.

== Personal life ==
In circa 1670, MacDonagh married Eleanor O'Rourke, grand-niece of Brian O'Rourke. The couple had no children.

Following MacDonagh's death, his widow erected a tomb for him at Ballindoon Friary, later replaced by a tall tombstone.

He arranged the marriage of his niece-in-law Mary O'Rourke, daughter of Colonel Tiernan O'Rourke, to his client Denis O’Conor of Bellanagare, and in turn they were the parents of Charles O'Conor of Belanagare. After his death his widow resided with the O'Conors in Bellanagare.
