= Ua Corcrain of Clonfert =

11th century abbot in Ireland

Ua Corcrain of Clonfert, Abbot of Clonfert, died 1095.

Ua Corcrain may have been a member of the Ó Cormacáin ecclesiastical family based in Síol Anmchadha, in what is now south-east County Galway.

Since the 18th and 19th century the name has been rendered as Ó Cormacáin, Cormacan, Cormican.

== See also ==
- Maelcoluim Ua Cormacain, Abbot of Aran, died 1114.
- Muirchertach Ua Carmacáin, Bishop of Clonfert, 1195–1203.
- Uilliam Ó Cormacáin, Archbishop of Tuam, 5 May 1386 – 1393.
- Henry Ó Cormacáin, last Abbot of Clonfert, fl. c.1534-c.1567.

Preceded by Aenghus Ua Flainn	Abbot of Clonfert ?–1095	Succeeded by Gillabhrenainn Ua hAnradhain
