= Máel Brigte Ua hEruráin =

Máel Brigte Ua hEruráin, Bishop of Clonfert, elected 1205.

Preceded by Muirchertach Ua Carmacáin	Bishops of Clonfert; 1205-unknown	Succeeded by Cormac Ó Luimlín
