= Thaddeus Francis O'Rourke =

Irish Catholic prelate

Thaddeus Francis O'Rourke O.F.M. Ref.
- Bishop of Killala
- Church: Catholic Church
- Diocese: Diocese of Killala
- In office: 15 March 1707 – 13 March 1735
- Predecessor: sede vacante
- Successor: Peter Archdeacon

Orders
- Consecration: 4 September 1707 by Patrick Donnelly

Personal details
- Born: c. 1659 County Leitrim, Kingdom of Ireland
- Died: 4 May 1735 (aged 75–76)
- Buried: Creevelea Abbey, Dromahair, County Leitrim, Ireland

Thaddeus ("Thady") Francis O'Rourke (c. 1659–4 May 1735) was an Irish Roman Catholic prelate who served as the Bishop of Killala from 1707 to 1735. He had been the chaplain for a time to Prince Eugene of Savoy.

== Early years and family ==
Little is known of the early life of O'Rourke. He was most likely born in Breffni, north Leitrim as this is the ancestral home of the family. He was the son of Brian Ballach Óg O'Rourke. O'Rourke was a great nephew of Sir Brian "na Múrtha" O'Rourke, Lord of West Breifne.

His brother, Colonel Tiernan O'Rourke (1650–1702), fled Ireland after the Treaty of Limerick (1691) and served the Hapsburg Empire; he was killed at the battle of Luzzara in the Po Valley in August 1702. Tiernan was regarded as the Chief of the O'Rourke's of Breffney, and by some accounts it seems he had gained the title of Count.

After Tiernan's death in 1702, his wife Isabella MacDonagh daughter of Capt. Brian MacDonagh of Ballindoon Castle, Co. Sligo became a Lady-in-waiting to Mary of Modena at the Jacobite court at Château de Saint-Germain-en-Laye outside Paris. She then retired to the house of her daughter Mary and her husband Denis O'Conor at Bellanagare in county Roscommon. She was the grandmother of the antiquarian and protagonist for catholic civil rights Charles O'Conor.

His sister, Eleanor O'Rourke, married Lt-Col. Terence MacDonagh of Creevagh in county Sligo. He was the only Catholic Barrister allowed to practice after the Penal Laws, Member of Parliament for Sligo in the Patriot Parliament in 1689, soldier, poet and landowner. After her husband's death in 1713, Eleanor moved to Bellanagare with her O'Conor relations.

== Religious life ==
He joined the Irish Franciscans on the continent some time before 1665. He obtained the Licentiate in Sacred Theology (Latin: Sacrae Theologiae Licentiatus; abbreviated STL) and lectured for a while. The most likely location for his lecturing career was the Irish Franciscan College of the Immaculate Conception, Prague. O'Rourke served as chaplain and private secretary to Prince Eugene of Savoy. Here he came to the attention of James III who nominated him as Bishop of Killala in 1705. Prince Eugene then introduced O'Rourke Leopold I, Holy Roman Emperor. Leopold gave O'Rourke letters of commendation to Queen Anne and a personally signed passport.

A Papal brief appointing O'Rourke to Killala was issued on 15 March 1707. The bishop-elect travelled to London and received an audience with Queen Anne. Now under royal protection from the effects of the Banishment Act of 1697, he made his way to Dublin. There he arranged his consecration in Newgate jail by Patrick Donnelly, Bishop of Dromore, assisted by Edmund Byrne, archbishop-elect of Dublin, and Fergus O'Farrell (Ferral), archdeacon of Ardagh and Clonmacnoise.

The diocese of Killala was one of the smallest and most remote in Ireland and had effectively been without a bishop since 1661. Unable to reside in the diocese, he took up residence with his brother-in-law, Terence MacDonagh, at Creevagh, Co. Sligo. There were only nineteen priests in the diocese at the time and bishop O'Rourke and had a busy job, When visiting his diocese, he stayed in the cottages of the ordinary people. One of the few active catholic bishops in Ireland at the time, he confirmed many people, ordained priests in several parts of the country, and consecrated a number of bishops such as in 1714 he consecrated Francis Burke as Archbishop of Tuam and Ambrose O'Madden as Bishop of Clonfert.

Queen Anne changed her religious policies after the death of Emperor Joseph I in 1711. No longer immune from prosecution, O’Rourke fled to the isolated area around Meelick friary in east County Galway and hid his identity under the name of Mr Fielding. After the death of Councellor MacDonagh in 1713, he took up residence with the O'Conors of Bellanagare, Co. Roscommon, where he acted as tutor to his great-nephew, the antiquarian and writer Charles O'Conor (1710–91). He had to go into hiding again in 1732–4.

== Death ==
Bishop O'Rourke died, probably at Bellanagare, on 13 March 1735 and was buried at Creevelea Abbey near Dromahair in county Leitrim.

Among the family heirlooms of the O’Conor family at Clonalis House is O’Rourke's plain chalice (designed to screw apart for easy concealment), his liturgical vestments, a copy of a letter of safe conduct from Emperor Leopold I to Queen Anne relating to O’Rourke's return to Ireland as well as his pectoral cross and episcopal ring, the latter two believed to have been presented to him by Prince Eugene.

Catholic Church titles
Preceded by Sede vacante	Bishop of Killala; 15 Mar 1707 – 13 Mar 1735	Succeeded by Peter Archdekin
