= Andrew O'Crean =

Irish bishop

Andrew O'Crean (? – 1594) was an Irish Roman Catholic Bishop. He served as the Bishop of Elphin from 1562 to 1594.

Not much is known about O'Crean's birth or early life. He was appointed as the Bishop of Elphin on January 28, 1562. He maintained control mainly in the northern parts of Elphin as Roland Burke, the Bishop of Elphin for the Church of Ireland, had control of most of the diocese. O'Crean also advocated for the Tridentine Reforms to be implemented, and he also refused to take the Oath of Supremacy. He died in the Convent of Sligo in 1594.
