= Petrus Ua Mórda =

Irish Cistercian bishop

Petrus Ua Mórda O.Cist.
- Bishop of Clonfert
- Province: Tuam
- Diocese: Clonfert
- Installed: circa 1150
- Term ended: 27 December 1171
- Predecessor: Gilla Pátraic Ua hAilchinned
- Successor: Máel Ísu Mac in Baird

Petrus Ua Mórda (Anglicised: Peter O'Mordha, (O')More, or (O')Moore) was Bishop of Clonfert from circa 1150 to 1171.

He appears to have been a member of a family from Ui Maine, one of the oldest and largest kingdoms located in Connacht, Ireland. Ua Mórda was abbot of Grellach dá Iach, the first of three sites inhabited by the Cistercians, and who finally settled at Boyle Abbey. In around 1150 AD, he became Bishop of Clonfert; styled as Bishop of Cluain-fearta-Brenainn or Bishop of Ui Maine.

He was greatly esteemed as "a divine and learned monk". He drowned in the River Shannon (Irish: Abha na Sionainne), near Port-da-Chaineg, on 27 December 1171.

A Dionysius Ó Mórdha would be Bishop of Clonfert from 1509 to 1534. The surname is nowadays rendered as Ó Mórdha and Moore.
