= Matthew O'Connor =

Matthew O'Connor may refer to:

- Matthew O'Connor (soccer) (born 1989), Canadian soccer player
- Matthew O'Connor (swimmer) (born 1971), British swimmer

== See also ==
- Matthew O'Conor (1773–1844), Irish historian
- Matt O'Connor (disambiguation)
