= Matthew O'Conor =

Irish historian

Matthew O'Conor (Irish: Mathghamhain Ó Conchubhair; 1773–1844) of Mount Druid House, Ballinagare, County Roscommon, Ireland was an Irish historian, Landowner from the O'Conor family, Barrister and de jure King of Connacht.

O'Conor was the grandson of Charles O'Conor (1710–1791) the famed Irish antiquarian of the 18th century. His brother the Rev. Charles O'Conor (1767–1828) was likewise a historian. Matthew was educated for the priesthood in Rome, but changed his mind and became by profession a lawyer.

Matthew was highly regarded by fellow Irish scholars such as George Petrie and John O'Donovan. To the latter he gave unstinting aid during his field work in Roscommon for the Ordnance Survey; O'Donovan held him in very high regard, not only because of his historical efforts and political work, but also because of his noble descent and status as a Prince of the Royal Family of Connacht. In this he was not alone; during the Tithe War a large assembly of Roscommon Catholics unanimously elected him King of Connacht (in his absence) and sent word to him to meet them at Carnfree for the formal inauguration, although it was his nephew Denis O'Conor, O'Conor Don was the O'Conor Don at the time.

He wrote The History of Irish Catholics from the Settlement in 1691, based on letters of his grandfather Charles O’Conor to Dr. John Curry.

== Bibliography ==
The History of Irish Catholics from the Settlement in 1691 (1813)

Military History of the Irish Nation comprising a Memoir of the Irish Brigade in the Service of France... AD 1550–1738 (1845).
