= Charles O'Conor (historian) =

Irish writer & antiquarian (1710–1791)

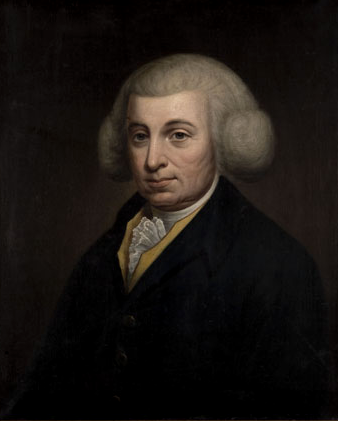
- Charles O'Conor of Belanagare.
- Born: 1 January 1710; Killintrany, County Sligo, Ireland
- Died: 1 July 1791 (aged 81); Bellanagare, County Roscommon, Ireland
- Occupations: Writer, antiquarian, protagonist of catholic civil rights
- Spouse: Catherine O'Fagan
- Children: 4 (Denis, Charles, Bridget, Catherine)
- Writing career
- Notable work: Dissertations on the ancient history of Ireland
- Movement: Enlightenment

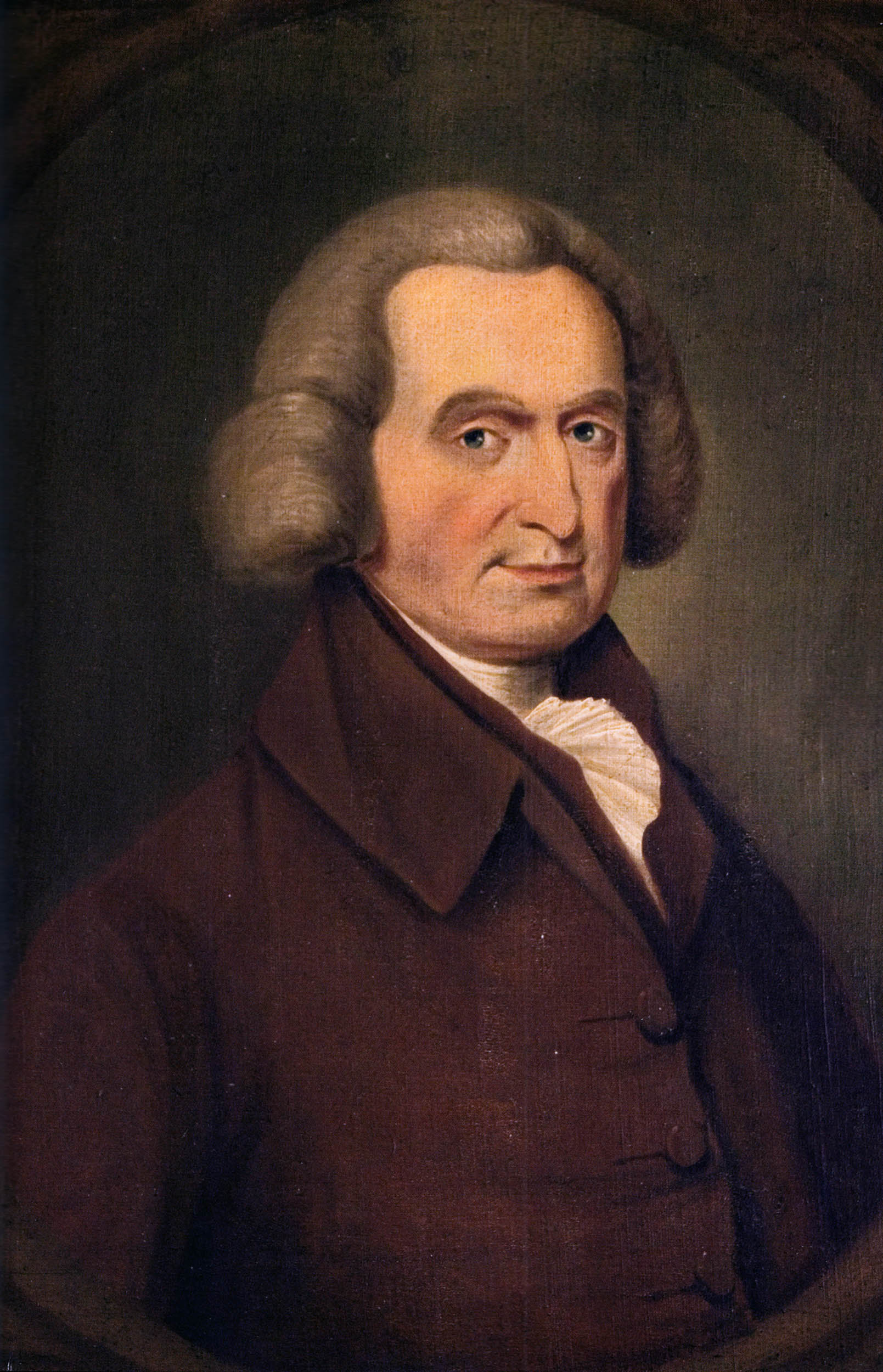
Charles O'Conor of Ballinagare (1710–1791), in middle age.

Charles O'Conor, RIA (Irish: Cathal Ó Conchubhair; 1 January 1710 – 1 July 1791), also known as Charles O'Conor of Belanagare, was a member of the Gaelic nobility of Ireland and antiquarian who was enormously influential as a protagonist for the preservation of Irish culture and Irish mythology during the 18th century. He combined an encyclopaedic knowledge of Irish manuscripts and Gaelic culture in demolishing many specious theories and suppositions concerning Irish history.

O'Conor was an activist for Catholic Emancipation during the eighteenth century. He worked relentlessly, first for the relaxation and then the complete repeal of the Penal Laws, and was a co-founder of the first Catholic Committee in 1757, along with his friend Dr. John Curry and Mr. Wyse of Waterford. In 1788, he became a member of the Royal Irish Academy.

His collection of manuscripts and manuscript copies, annotated with his copious notes and comments, made up the first part of the Annals of the Four Masters (originally the property of Fearghal Ó Gadhra) that were collected at the Stowe Library, and at that time many of them were the only copies known to exist.

== Early life ==
Charles O'Conor was born in 1710, in Knockmore, near Kilmactrany in the County Sligo, to Denis O'Conor of Bellanagare a scion of a cadet branch of the land-owning family of O'Conor Don, and Mary O'Rourke daughter of Colonel Count Tiernan O'Rourke, The O'Rourke (d. in 1702 at the Battle of Luzzara fighting for the armies of the Holy Roman Emperor) and Isabella MacDonagh daughter of Captain Brian MacDonagh of Ballindoon, county Sligo. His grandmother, Isabella, was once a lady in waiting to Mary of Modena at the Château de Saint-Germain-en-Laye outside Paris.

Furthermore, His mother was a niece of one of the only Catholics allowed to practice as a barrister under the Penal laws, Terence MacDonagh of Creevagh, County Sligo, who helped his father regain a mere 800 acres at Bellanagare of the family's former estates. Another uncle of his mother was Rev. Thaddeus Francis O'Rourke, outlawed Catholic Bishop of Killala, and once chaplain and personal assistant of Prince Eugene of Savoy.

After initially attending a hedge school taught by the surviving Dominicans of Ballindoon Friary while also being tutored by his great uncle, Rev. Thaddeus Francis O'Rourke. The bishop instructed him in English and Latin literature, and urged him to cultivate Irish. He translated as an exercise the Miserere into Irish. The bishop was delighted with the version, and read it aloud. Torlogh O'Carolan the harper, a frequent guest at Belanagare, wept on hearing it, and, taking his harp, at once began to compose and sing his lay, Donnchadh MacCathail oig, in which the fall of the Milesian families is lamented, and the goodness of O'Conor of Belanagare celebrated. Charles preserved throughout life the harp upon which O'Carolan sang, and himself became a skilful harper. Cathaoir MacCabe, the poet, and Major MacDermot, the ‘broken soldier’ of Oliver Goldsmith's Traveller, were other friends of his youth, and the Rev. Thomas Contarine, Goldsmith's relative, was his first literary correspondent.

After some further education from a priest named Dynan, O'Conor was then sent for his education to Father Walter Skelton's school in Dublin. Thus, he grew up in an environment that celebrated Gaelic culture and heritage, while also emphasizing the study of the Classics. He began collecting and studying ancient manuscripts at an early age. Also Skelton ingeniously demonstrated the refraction of rays of light by the aid of a partly filled punchbowl and led O'Conor to take an interest in natural philosophy.

His marriage to Catherine O'Hagan, daughter of a Merchant named John O'Hagan of Boyle, County Roscommon. Such was the rigour of the laws against priests that, in the year after his marriage, he was obliged to attend mass in a sort of cave, thence called Pol an aiffrin. The marriage brought him financial stability so that he could live at Bellanagare and devote himself to his writing. He was widowed in 1750, within a year of his father's death. When his eldest son Denis married in 1760, he gave up the residence at Bellanagare to him and moved into a smaller house that he had built on the estate, which he called the Hermitage. He would devote the remainder of his life to the collection and study of Irish manuscripts, to the publication of dissertations, and especially to the cause of Irish and Catholic emancipation.

In the 1749 census of the Diocese of Elphin, O'Conor was listed as having 4 servants in Bellanagare and 5 couples living on his land who also worked as servants.

== Professional life ==
O'Conor was well known in Ireland from his youth as a civil-tongued, but adamant advocate of Gaelic culture and history, who had suffered for his adherence to the Roman Catholic faith. He was profoundly knowledgeable about Irish culture and history.

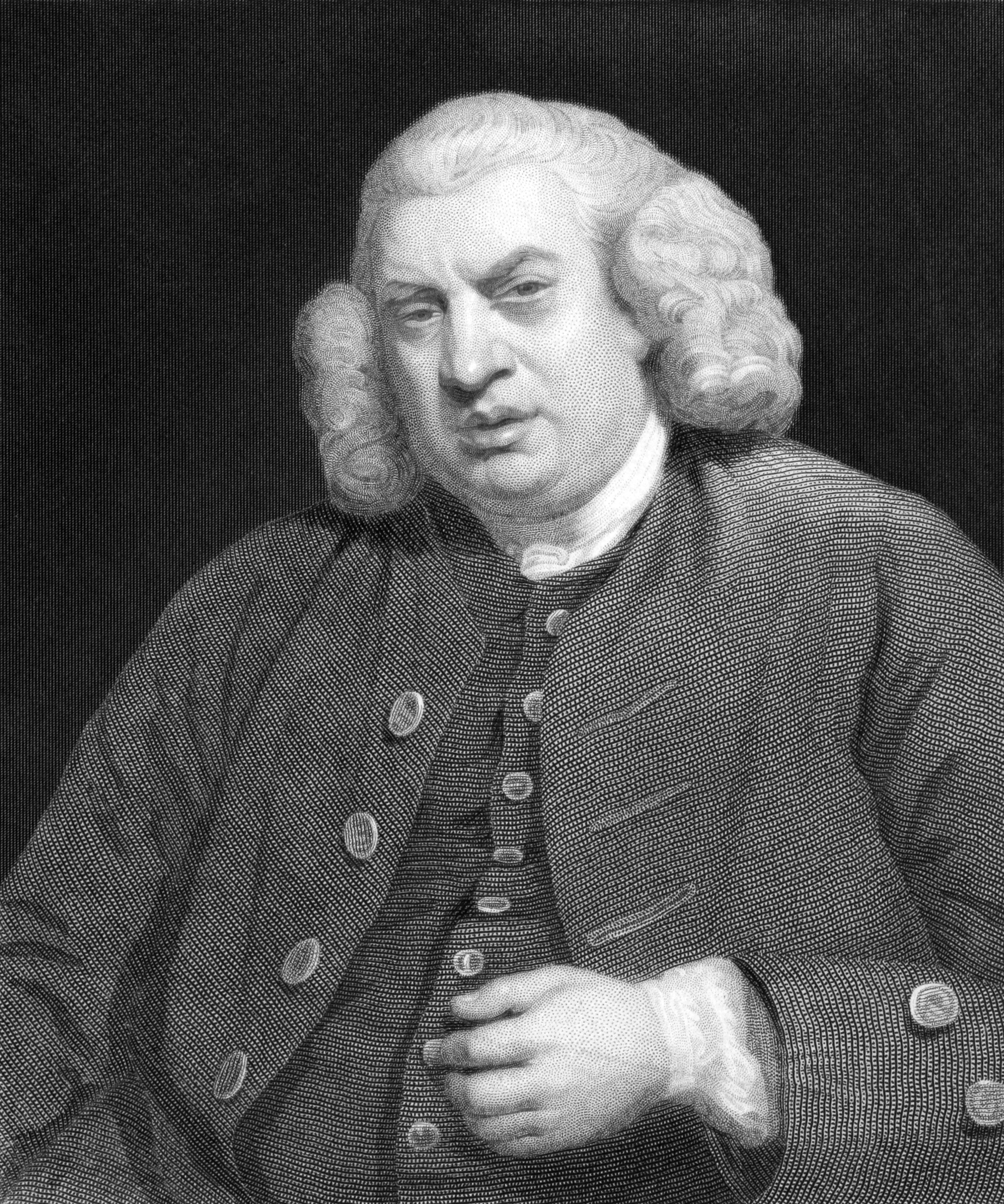
Samuel Johnson in 1775.

He garnered fame outside Ireland through his Dissertations on the ancient history of Ireland (1753). Like all of his works, his account was everywhere consistent with the historical record. The book was generally well received, and when Samuel Johnson was made aware of it, he was moved to write a letter to O'Conor in 1755, complimenting the book, complimenting the Irish people, and urging O'Conor to write on the topic of Celtic languages.

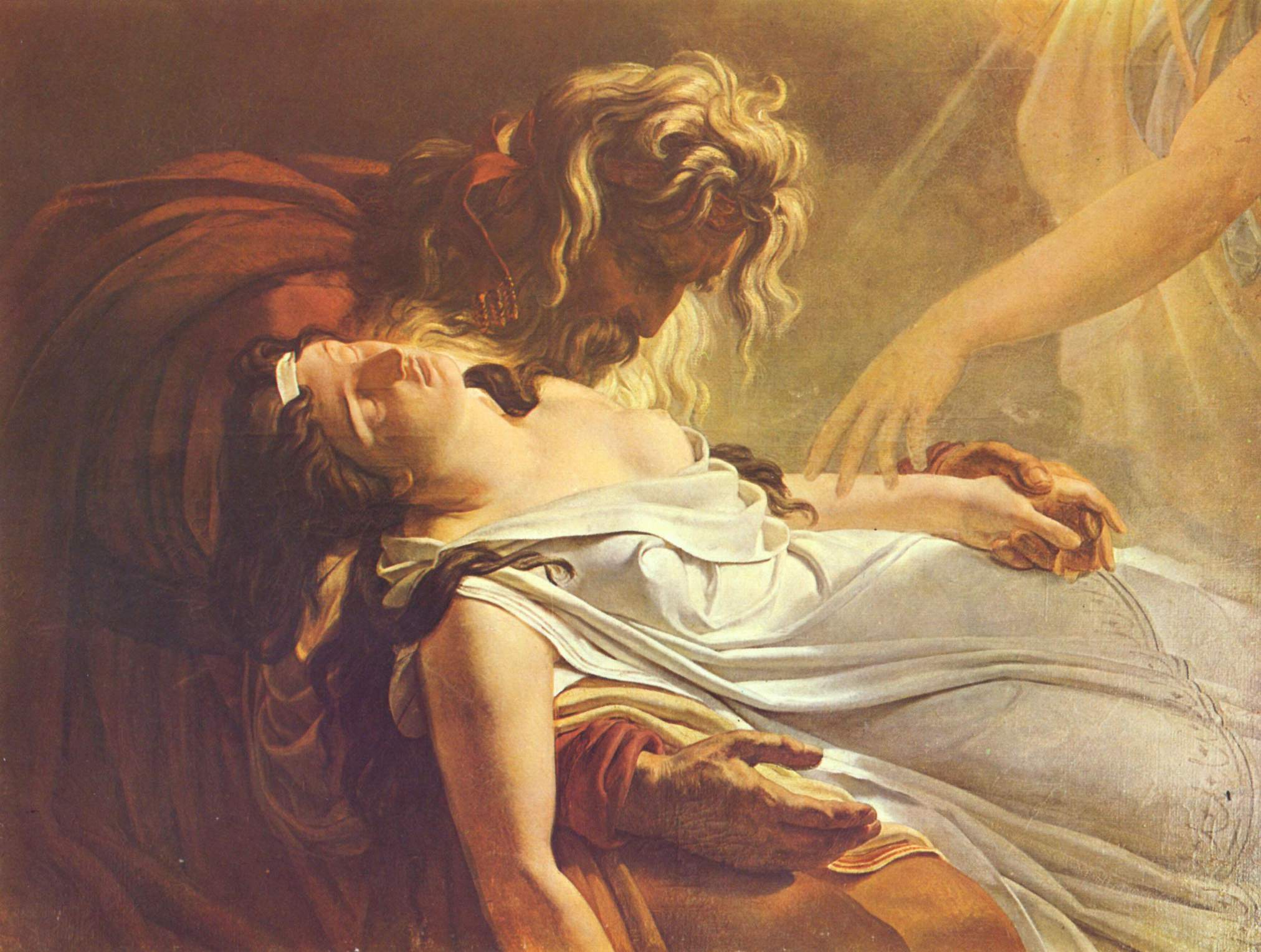
Malvine, dying in the arms of Fingal, by Ary Scheffer.

The book was less well received in some Scottish circles, where there existed a movement to write Celtic history based upon Scottish origins. When James Macpherson published a spurious story in 1761 that he had found an ancient Gaelic (and Scottish) cycle of poems by a certain "Ossian", among the critics who rejected it as false was O'Conor, as an inclusion (Remarks on Mr. Mac Pherson's translation of Fingal and Temora) in the 1766 rewrite of his 1753 work. While the issue was laid to public rest by others (notably Samuel Johnson), the issue was laid to intellectual rest by O'Conor in 1775, with the publication of his Dissertation on the origin and antiquities of the antient Scots. The fact that the issue occurred provided O'Conor the opportunity to establish Ireland as the source of Gaelic culture in the minds of the non-Irish general public.

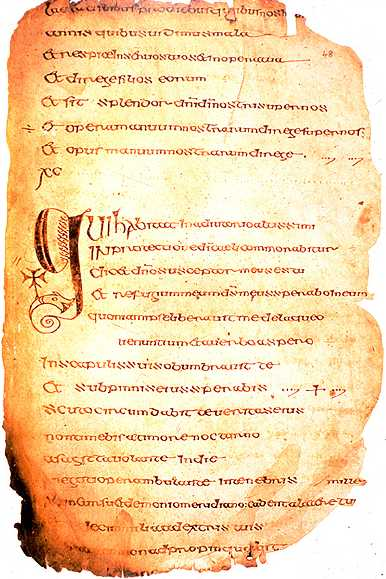
An Irish manuscript from the Cathach of St. Columba.

O'Conor's later life was that of the respected dean of Irish historians. He continued to write as he had always done, in favour of ideas that he himself favoured and were consistent with the historical record, and against any and all ideas that were inconsistent with the historical record, including those of other Irish historians. Such was his esteemed reputation that even those whom he challenged would include his challenges in the next edition of their own books. He would continue to collect, study, and annotate Irish manuscripts, and when he died, his collection became the first part of the Annals of the Four Masters at the Stowe Library. In 1883 these were returned to the Royal Irish Academy library.

In 1766, he was introduced by Edmund Burke to the Revd. Thomas Leland at Trinity College Dublin, and was using its library and meeting its Provost from 1767.

His unfinished History of Ireland, which Johnson had encouraged in 1777, was destroyed on his instructions at his death.

In his Tour in Ireland (1780) Arthur Young mentioned his visit to O'Conor:

At Clonells, near Castlerea, lives O’Connor, the direct descendant of Roderick O’Connor, who was king of Connaught six or seven hundred years ago; there is a monument of him in Roscommon Church, with his sceptre, etc. I was told as a certainty that this family were here long before the coming of the Milesians. Their possessions, formerly so great, are reduced to three or four hundred pounds a year, the family having fared in the revolutions of so many ages much worse than the O’Niels and O’Briens. The common people pay him the greatest respect, and send him presents of cattle, etc., upon various occasions. They consider him as the prince of a people involved in one common ruin.

== Legacy ==
His legacy in modern history is succinct. Though the effort was promoted by many, it was largely through his effectiveness that Ireland received the recognition that it deserved as the font of Gaelic culture and the premier disseminator of literacy in ancient times. O'Conor also strove for the presentation of Celtic Christianity as something separate from early Roman Catholicism as a means of allaying Protestant British distrust of the Catholic Irish, a perspective that has survived into modern times.

O'Conor's support for the first Catholic Committees from 1758 was copied nationwide, resulting in the successful, but slow, repeal of most of the Irish penal laws in 1774–1793.

An account of his life, "Memoirs of the life and writings of the late Charles O'Conor of Belanagare", was written by his grandson, Charles O'Conor. Another grandson Matthew O'Conor also became a historian and used papers collected by his grandfather to write "The History of Irish Catholics from the Settlement in 1691". Another grandson, Owen O'Conor, became O'Conor Don in 1820. A prominent supporter of Catholic Emancipation and was a close associate of Daniel O'Connell and the first catholic member of parliament for Roscommon since before the penal laws.

== Personal life ==
O'Conor married Catherine O'Hagan, daughter of John O'Hagan of Boyle, a merchant, and had issue:

- Denis Óg O'Conor (1732–1804); he was the father of Owen O'Conor, O'Conor Don MP (father of Denis O'Conor, O'Conor Don), Rev. Charles O'Conor, and Matthew O'Conor.
- Charles O'Conor of Mount Allen house (1736–1808); he was the father of Thomas O'Conor, and grandfather of Charles O'Conor of New York
- Bridget O'Conor who married Myles MacDermot, The MacDermot and had issue including Hugh MacDermot, The MacDermot

After his wife's death, it appears he had an illegitimate daughter named Catherine (Kitty Bahn) who married her sister's widower and had a son; Andrew McDermot.

== Partial bibliography ==
Among O'Conor's principal works are:

- Dissertations on the ancient history of Ireland (1753)
- Principles of the Roman Catholics (1756)
- Introduction to Dr. Curry's Civil Wars (1756)
- The Protestant Interest of Ireland considered (1757)
- Dissertations on the ancient history of Ireland. To which is subjoined a dissertation on the Irish colonies established in Britain. With some remarks on Mr. Mac Pherson's translation of Fingal and Temora. (1766)
- A dissertation on the origin and antiquities of the antient Scots, and notes, critical and explanatory, on Mr. O'Flaherty's text – included in The Ogygia vindicated: against the objections of Sir George Mackenzie, king's advocate for Scotland in the reign of king James II, by Roderic O'Flaherty (1775)
- On the Heathen State and Topography of Ancient Ireland (1783)

== See also ==
- Tadhg Og Ó Cianáin
- Peregrine Ó Duibhgeannain
- Lughaidh Ó Cléirigh
- Mícheál Ó Cléirigh
- Sylvester O'Halloran
- James Ussher
- Sir James Ware
- Mary Bonaventure Browne
- Dubhaltach Mac Fhirbhisigh
- Ruaidhrí Ó Flaithbheartaigh
- Uilliam Ó Duinnín
- Eugene O'Curry
- John O'Donovan (scholar)
- James MacLagan
- Bellanagare

== Sources ==
- Stephen, Leslie, ed. (1888). "O'Conor, Charles (1710–1791)" . Dictionary of National Biography. Vol. 14. London: Smith, Elder & Co. pp. 855–857.
- Moran, Patrick Francis (1899), The Catholics of Ireland Under the Penal Laws in the Eighteenth Century, London: Catholic Truth Society
- Napier, Alexander (1889), "Appendix IV. Johnson's Relations with Charles O'Conor.", The Life of Samuel Johnson, LL.D. (by James Boswell), vol. III, London: George Bell and Sons, pp. 477–480
- O'Conor, Charles (c. 1750), "The Ancient Regal Family of O'Conor of Connaught", in Hardiman, James (ed.), A Chorographical Description of West or H-Iar Connaught (by Roderic O'Flaherty in 1684), Dublin: Irish Archaeological Society, pp. 134–142
- O'Conor, Charles (1775), "The Editor's Preface", The Ogygia [by Roderic O'Flaherty] Vindicated, Dublin: G. Faulkner, pp. i–xxii
- O'Conor, Charles (1775), "A Dissertation on the Origin and Antiquities of the antient Scots of Ireland and Britain.", The Ogygia [by Roderic O'Flaherty] Vindicated, Dublin: G. Faulkner, pp. xxv–xlviii
- O'Conor, Charles (1786), "Second Letter to Colonel Vallancey, on the Heathen State, and Antient Topography of Ireland", Collectanea de Rebus Hibernicis (by Charles Vallancey), vol. III, Dublin: Luke White, pp. 647–677
- O'Conor, Charles (the grandson) (1818), Bibliotheca Ms. Stowensis, vol. I, Buckingham: J. Seeley
- O'Conor, Charles (the grandson) (1819), Bibliotheca Ms. Stowensis, vol. II, Buckingham: J. Seeley
- O'Donovan, John (1891), O'Conor, Charles Owen (ed.), The O'Conors of Connaught: An Historical Memoir, Dublin: Hodges, Figgis, and Co., pp. 292–297
