= Tomás mac Gilbert Ó Cellaigh =

Tomás mac Gilbert Ó Cellaigh, Bishop of Clonfert, died 1378.

== Early life ==
Tomás was a son of a king of Ui Maine, Gilbert Ó Cellaigh, who reigned 1307–15, and again from 1318 till his death in 1322.

== Career ==
Tomás became bishop before 14 October 1347, the see having been vacant for some years after the death of Bishop Seoán Ó Leaáin in 1336. Ó Cellaigh died 1378, being succeeded by his cousin, Muircheartach mac Pilib Ó Ceallaigh.

Catholic Church titles
Preceded by Seoán Ó Leaáin	Bishops of Clonfert c.1347–1378	Succeeded by Muircheartach mac Pilib Ó Ceallaigh
