= Gilla Pátraic Ua hAilchinned =

Gilla Pátraic Ua hAilchinned, Bishop of Clonfert, died 1149.

Preceded by Muiredach Ua hÉnlainge	Bishops of Clonfert unknown-1149	Succeeded by Petrus Ua Mórda
