= Gillabhrenainn Ua hAnradhain =

Abbot in Ireland (died 1134)

Gillabhrenainn Ua hAnradhain (died 1134) was Abbot of Clonfert.

Preceded by Ua Corcrain of Clonfert	Abbot of Clonfert ?–1134	Succeeded by ?

== See also ==
- Corpus of Electronic Texts
