= Thady Keogh =

Irish prelate

Thady Keogh (also known as Thaddeus Keogh or Tadhg Mac Eogha) was an Irish prelate who served as Bishop of Clonfert in the seventeenth century.

Keogh was born in County Roscommon. He was appointed on 13 July and consecrated in October 1671. Tadhg Keogh or Mac Eogha.
