= Peter O'Donnellan =

Irish prelate

- Bishop of Clonfert
- Church: Catholic Church
- Diocese: Diocese of Clonfert
- In office: 11 August 1733 – 7 May 1778
- Predecessor: Edmund Kelly
- Successor: Andrew O'Donellan

Personal details
- Born: c. 1678
- Died: 7 May 1778 (aged 99–100)

Peter O'Donnellan (c. 1678 - 7 May 1778) was a long serving Irish prelate who served as Bishop of Clonfert for over forty years.

He was selected as Clonfert on 3 August 1733, and confirmed on the 11 August that year. He died on 7 May 1778 aged 100.

Catholic Church titles
Preceded by Edmund Kelly	Bishop of Clonfert; 1733–1786	Succeeded by Andrew O'Donellan
