= Thomas Costello (bishop) =

Irish prelate

- Bishop of Clonfert
- Church: Catholic Church
- Diocese: Diocese of Clonfert
- In office: 6 July 1786 – 9 October 1831
- Predecessor: Andrew O'Donellan
- Successor: Thomas Coen
- Previous posts: Titular Bishop of Aenus (1786); Coadjutor Bishop of Clonfert (1786)

Orders
- Ordination: December 1767

Personal details
- Born: 1744 Ballaghaderreen, County Mayo, Kingdom of Ireland
- Died: 8 October 1831 (aged 86–87)

Thomas Costello (1744 – 1831) was an Irish prelate who served as Bishop of Clonfert.

He was born in Ballaghaderreen. Coen went to the Irish College in Rome to study for the priesthood and was ordained priest in December 1767. Coen was appointed titular bishop of Milevum on 26 January 1816; and Diocesan Bishop of Clonfert on 6 July 1786. He died in post on 8 October 1831.

Catholic Church titles
Preceded by Andrew O'Donellan	Bishop of Clonfert; 1786–1831	Succeeded by Thomas Coen
