= Thomas Ryan (bishop) =

Irish prelate

The Most Reverend Thomas Ryan
- Bishop of Clonfert
- Church: Roman Catholic Church
- Diocese: Clonfert
- Appointed: 16 June 1963
- Term ended: 1 May 1982
- Predecessor: John Dignan
- Successor: John Kirby

Orders
- Ordination: 10 July 1938
- Consecration: 16 June 1963

Personal details
- Born: February 8, 1915 Kilcommon, County Tipperary, Ireland
- Died: August 21, 1983 (aged 68) Ireland
- Education: St. Patrick's College, Thurles; Irish College, Rome; Pontifical Lateran University

Thomas Ryan (8 February 1915 – 21 August 1983) was an Irish prelate who served as Bishop of Clonfert.

Ryan was born in Kilcommon, County Tipperary. He was educated locally at Kilcommon national school and Mount Melleray seminary, Co. Waterford. He studied for the priesthood at St. Patrick's College, Thurles and the Irish College, Rome, and ordained priest in Rome on 10 July 1938.

== Priestly ministry ==
After his ordination Ryan continued his studies in the Lateran University, Rome eventually taking a doctorate of theology and doctorate of canon law. He entered the diplomatic service of the Holy See in 1943, serving on the staff of Archbishop Roncalli/Pope John XXIII who was apostolic delegate to Turkey and Greece. In the late 1940s Ryan returned to Rome and served in a variety of Vatican positions. In 1961 he accompanied Gregorio Pietro Agagianian papal legate to the patrician year celebrations; while in February 1963 he represented the Vatican secretariat of state at the funeral of John D'Alton, archbishop of Armagh.

== Episcopal ministry ==
He was consecrated Diocesan Bishop of Clonfert on 16 June 1963.

The most public aspect of his episcopal ministry has become known as "The Bishop and the Nightie" and dates from Feb 1966 when Bishop Ryan denounced from the pulpit the RTÉ chat show host Gay Byrne for asking a married couple about the colour of her nightdress on the night of her honeymoon. Bishop Ryan urged congregation in his Cathedral to register its protest ‘in any manner you think fit, so as to show the producers in Irish television, that you, as decent Catholics, will not tolerate programmes of this nature.’ This intervention was widely regarded as clerical outrage out of step with wider public opinion.

He resigned on 1 May 1982 and died on 21 August 1983.

Catholic Church titles
Preceded by William Philbin	Roman Catholic Bishop of Clonfert; 1963–1982	Succeeded by Joseph Cassidy
