= Andrew O'Donellan =

Irish prelate

- Bishop of Clonfert
- Church: Catholic Church
- Diocese: Diocese of Clonfert
- In office: 7 May 1778 – 1786
- Predecessor: Peter O'Donnellan
- Successor: Thomas Costello
- Previous posts: Titular Bishop of Antiphellus (1776-1778); Coadjutor Bishop of Clonfert (1776-1778)

Personal details
- Died: c. 1786

Andrew O'Donnellan was an Irish prelate who served as Bishop of Clonfert in the eighteenth century.

He was appointed coadjutor bishop of Clonfert on1 December 1776, succeeded on 7 May 1778 and died in 1786.

Catholic Church titles
Preceded by Peter O'Donnellan	Bishop of Clonfert; 1778–1786	Succeeded by Thomas Costello
