= Charles O'Conor (priest) =

Irish priest and historical author

Charles O'Conor (Irish: Cathal Ó Conchubhair Donn; 1764–1828) was an Irish priest and historical author. He was chaplain and librarian to the Marchioness of Buckingham and catalogued many manuscripts, including the famous Stowe Missal, now in the Royal Irish Academy. His grandfather was the historian Charles O'Connor, his brother the historian Matthew O'Conor.

== Description ==
O’Conor was a man of mild and timid disposition, liked by every one who knew him, and possessing extensive historical and ‘bookish’ information. In appearance he was short and slight, of sallow complexion, with prominent but distinguished looking features, giving him as age advanced a most vulnerable appearance. His manners were a curious compound of Irish and Italian. He was known locally as ‘the Abbé,’ and was for many years daily to be seen walking between Stowe and Buckingham, with his book and gold-headed cane, reading as he walked.

== Life ==
Charles O'Conor was educated in Ludovisi College, Rome from 1779 to 1791 and was appointed parish priest of Kilkeevin, County Roscommon (1792–98). In 1796 he published a memoir of his grandfather, the historian Charles O'Connor which he later suppressed.

In 1798 he was invited to become chaplain to Mary Nugent, the Marchioness of Buckingham and to organize and translate a collection of Gaelic manuscripts at Stowe. With him he brought papers of his grandfather to Stowe, including fifty-nine Gaelic manuscripts. In Stowe O'Conor wrote Columbanus ad Hibernos (1810–13), a series of letters supporting the royal veto on Catholic episcopal appointments in Ireland. These were answered by Francis Plowden and saw him suspended from duties of parish priest by John Troy, Archbishop of Dublin. In his duties as librarian he edited the Four Masters, and other chronicles from the Stowe Library as Rerum Hibernicarum Scriptores Veteres (1814–26), an edition regarded as unreliable.

Connor experienced mental illness. After leaving Stowe in 1827, he was briefly confined in a Dublin asylum. He died in Belenagare and is buried in Ballintober.

== Partial bibliography ==
- Memoirs of the Life and Writings of the Late Charles O’Connor (1796)
- An Historical Address, on the Calamities Occasioned by Foreign Influence, in the Nomination of Bishops to Irish Sees. (1812)
- Columbanus ad Hibernos (1810-1813) part VI (1813)
- Narrative of the most Interesting Events in Irish History (1812)
- Rerum Hibernicarum Scriptores Veteres (1814–26), Volume II (1825), Volume IV (1826)
- Bibliotheca Ms. Stowensis: A Descriptive Catalogue of the Manuscripts in the Stowe Library (1818)
