= Domnall Ua Finn =

Domnall Ua Finn (died 1195), Bishop of Clonfert.

Ua Finn (later Ó Finn or Finn) derived from the Irish fionn, meaning fair or fair-haired. From the medieval annals, the surname appears to have arisen independently in at least three distinct areas: in Oriel; in Ui Fiachrach Aidhne in what is now County Galway and in Uí Fiachrach Muaidhe in what is now County Sligo. All three families were unrelated.

The Galway family were based around Kilcolgan in the south of the county, where they were hereditary abbots of Kilcolgan. The date of Ua Finn's appointment is uncertain; the Annals of the Four Masters, citing him as Coarb of Clonfert-Brendan, records his death sub anno 1195.

Preceded by Muirchertach Ua Máel Uidir	Bishops of Clonfert unknown-1195	Succeeded by Muirchertach Ua Carmacáin
