= Matt O'Connor =

Matt O'Connor may refer to:

- Matt O'Connor (activist), (born 1967) founder and leader of Fathers 4 Justice
- Matt O'Connor (ice hockey) (born 1992), Canadian ice hockey player
- Matt O'Connor (rugby union) (born 1971), Australian rugby player and coach

== See also ==
- Matthew O'Connor (disambiguation)
