= Parliament of Northern Ireland =

Bicameral legislature of Northern Ireland (1921–1972)

- Devolved Parliament
- Arms of Northern Ireland, 1924–1972

Type
- Type: Bicameral
- Houses: Senate; House of Commons

History
- Established: 7 June 1921
- Disbanded: 30 March 1972
- Preceded by: UK Parliament (1801–1921)
- Succeeded by: Northern Ireland Assembly (1973)

Leadership
- Speaker of the Senate: Lord Glentoran (last)
- Speaker of the House: Ivan Neill (last)

Elections
- Senate voting system: Elected by the Commons via STV
- House of Commons voting system: Single transferable vote (1921–1929); First-past-the-post (1929–1972)

Meeting place
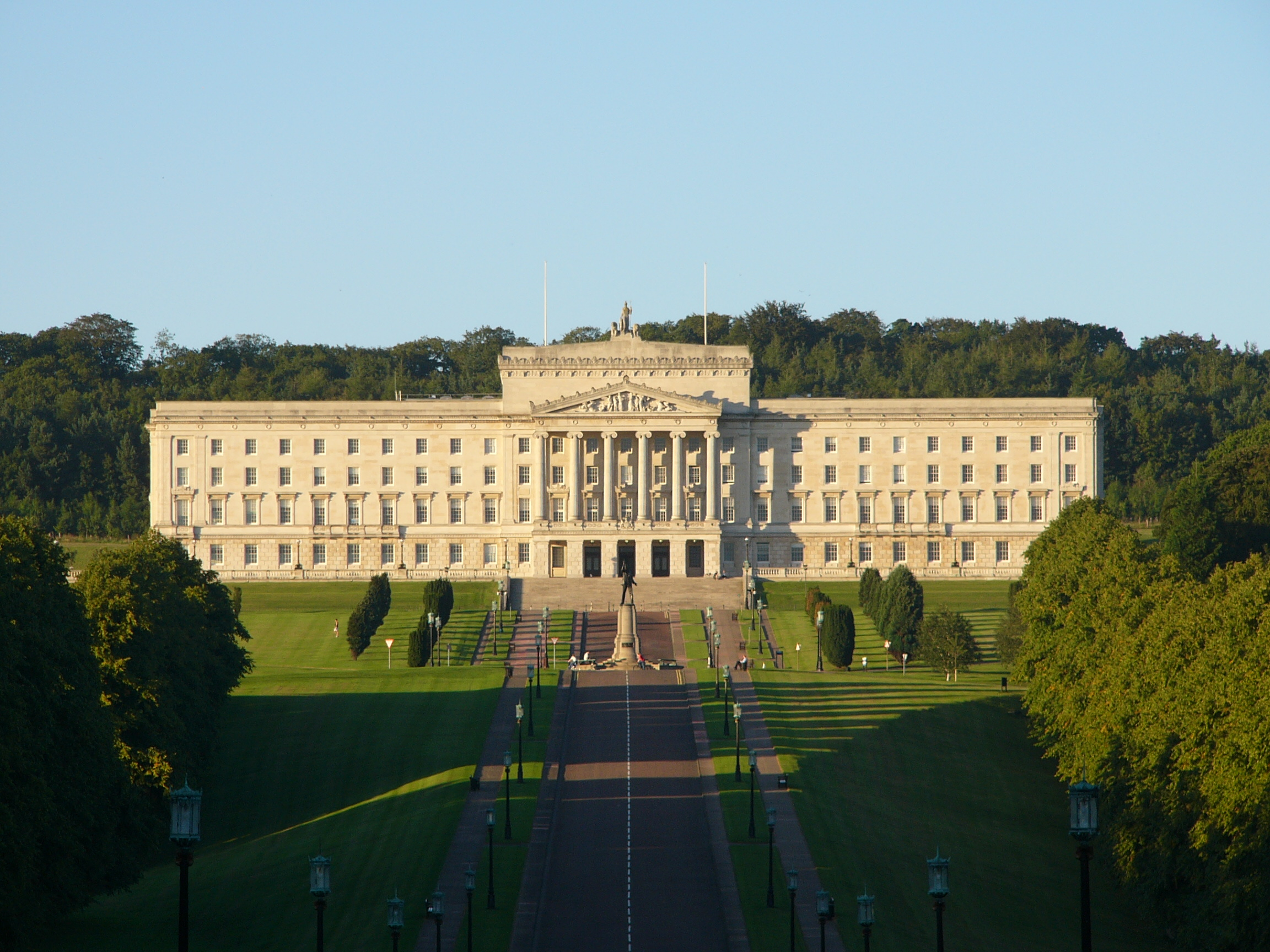
- Parliament Buildings, Stormont, Belfast

The Parliament of Northern Ireland was the home rule legislature of Northern Ireland, created under the Government of Ireland Act 1920, which sat from 7 June 1921 to 30 March 1972, when it was suspended because of its inability to restore order during the Troubles, resulting in the introduction of direct rule. It was abolished under the Northern Ireland Constitution Act 1973.

The Parliament of Northern Ireland was bicameral, consisting of a House of Commons with 52 seats, and an indirectly elected Senate with 26 seats. The Sovereign was represented by the governor (initially by the Lord Lieutenant), who granted royal assent to Acts of Parliament in Northern Ireland, but executive power rested with the prime minister, the leader of the largest party in the House of Commons.

== House of Commons ==
The House of Commons had 52 members, of which 48 were for territorial seats, and four were for graduates of Queen's University, Belfast (until 1969, when the four university seats were replaced by an additional four territorial seats, alongside the abolition of plural voting). The Government of Ireland Act 1920 prescribed that elections to the House of Commons should be by single transferable vote (STV), though the Parliament was given the power to alter the electoral system from three years after its first meeting. The STV system was the subject of criticism from grassroots Unionists, but because the three-year period ended during the Labour government of 1924, the Stormont government decided not to provoke the known egalitarian sympathies of many Labour backbenchers and held the second election on the same basis. The loss of eight Unionist seats in that election caused great acrimony, and in 1929, the system was changed to first-past-the-post for all territorial constituencies, though STV was retained for the university seats.

In the 1925 election, however, Republicans also lost four seats and a substantial proportion of votes. Nationalists gained the same number of seats that Republicans had lost, but had only gained a small percentage of votes. It had been felt by some that Northern Ireland should use the same first-past-the-post system that was in place in the rest of the UK.

By the time the first-past-the-post system was implemented by the House of Commons (Method of Voting and Redistribution of Seats) Act (Northern Ireland) 1929 (19 Geo. 5. c. 5 (N.I.)) for the 1929 election, the Republicans had few or no candidates and pro-Irish unification voters were represented almost solely by the Nationalist Party. Despite the change in the electoral system and accusations of gerrymandering, the Nationalist Party lost 9.5% share of the vote, but still gained a seat. The more moderate Northern Ireland Labour Party and Ulster Liberal Party both gained in vote share but lost seats.

The boundary changes for 1929 were not made by an impartial boundary commission but by the Unionist government, for which it was accused of gerrymandering. The charges that the Stormont seats (as opposed to local council wards) were gerrymandered against Nationalists is disputed by historians (since the number of Nationalists elected under the two systems barely changed), though it is agreed that losses under the change to single-member constituency boundaries were suffered by independent unionists, the Liberals and the Northern Ireland Labour Party. Population movements were so small that these boundaries were used almost everywhere until the Parliament was dissolved in 1972. In 1968 the government abolished the Queen's University constituency (university constituencies had been abolished at Westminster with effect from 1950) and created four new constituencies in the outskirts of Belfast where populations had grown. This change helped the Unionists, as they held only two of the university seats but won all four of the newly created seats. There had, however, long been calls from outside Unionism to abolish the graduate franchise (and other anomalies) and to have "one person one vote".

== Senate ==
The Senate was a last-minute addition to the Parliament, after the original plans for a single Senate covering both the Stormont and Dublin Parliaments were overtaken by events.

Twenty-four senators were elected by the House of Commons using the single transferable vote. The elections were carried out after each general election, with 12 members elected for two parliaments each time. The other two seats were held ex officio by the Lord Mayor of Belfast and the mayor of Derry. The Senate generally had the same party balance as the House of Commons, though abstaining parties and very small parties were not represented. Because of this, and its dependence on the House of Commons for election, it had virtually no political impact.

== The Crown ==
The British monarch was originally to have been represented in both Northern Ireland and Southern Ireland by the Lord Lieutenant of Ireland. However, the replacement of Southern Ireland by the Irish Free State led to the abolition of the post of Lord Lieutenant. Instead, a new office – Governor of Northern Ireland – was created on 12 December 1922.

== Location ==
Initially the Parliament met in Belfast's City Hall but then moved to the Presbyterian Church's Assembly's College (later Union Theological College), where it remained during the period 1921–1932. The Commons met in the college's Gamble Library and the Senate in the chapel. In 1932, Parliament moved to the new purpose-built Parliament Buildings, designed by Sir Arnold Thornely, at Stormont, on the eastern outskirts of the city. "Stormont" came to be a synecdoche referring both to the Parliament itself and to the Northern Ireland government.

== Legislation ==
Stormont was given power to legislate over almost all aspects of Northern Ireland life, with only a few matters excluded from its remit, the most important of which are: succession to the Crown, making of peace or war, armed forces, honours, naturalisation, some central taxes and postal services (a full list is in section 4 of the Government of Ireland Act 1920). The parliament did not try to infringe the terms of the Government of Ireland Act 1920; on only one occasion did the United Kingdom government advise the king to withhold royal assent. This was the Local Government Act (Northern Ireland) which abolished proportional representation in local government elections; the issue was referred to London and royal assent was eventually given. The output of legislation was high for a devolved parliament, though some of the acts were adaptations of recently passed acts by the United Kingdom parliament. It was nominally prohibited by section 16 of the schedule to the Irish Free State (Agreement) Act 1922 from making any law which directly or indirectly discriminated against a religion, although this provision had little effect.

== Brief history ==
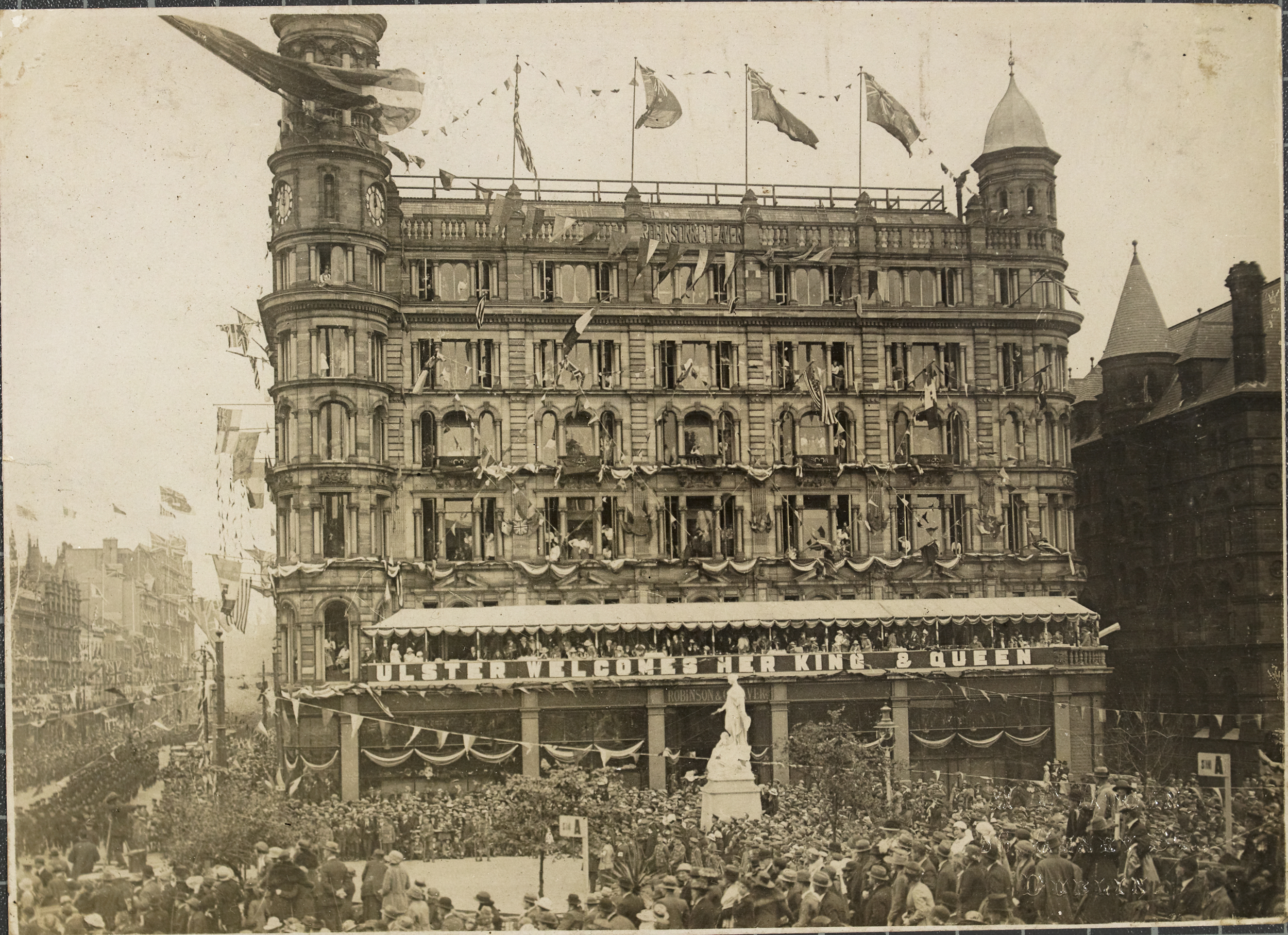
Robinson and Cleaver Department Store in Belfast, decorated for the State Opening of the first Northern Ireland parliament. 22 June 1921.

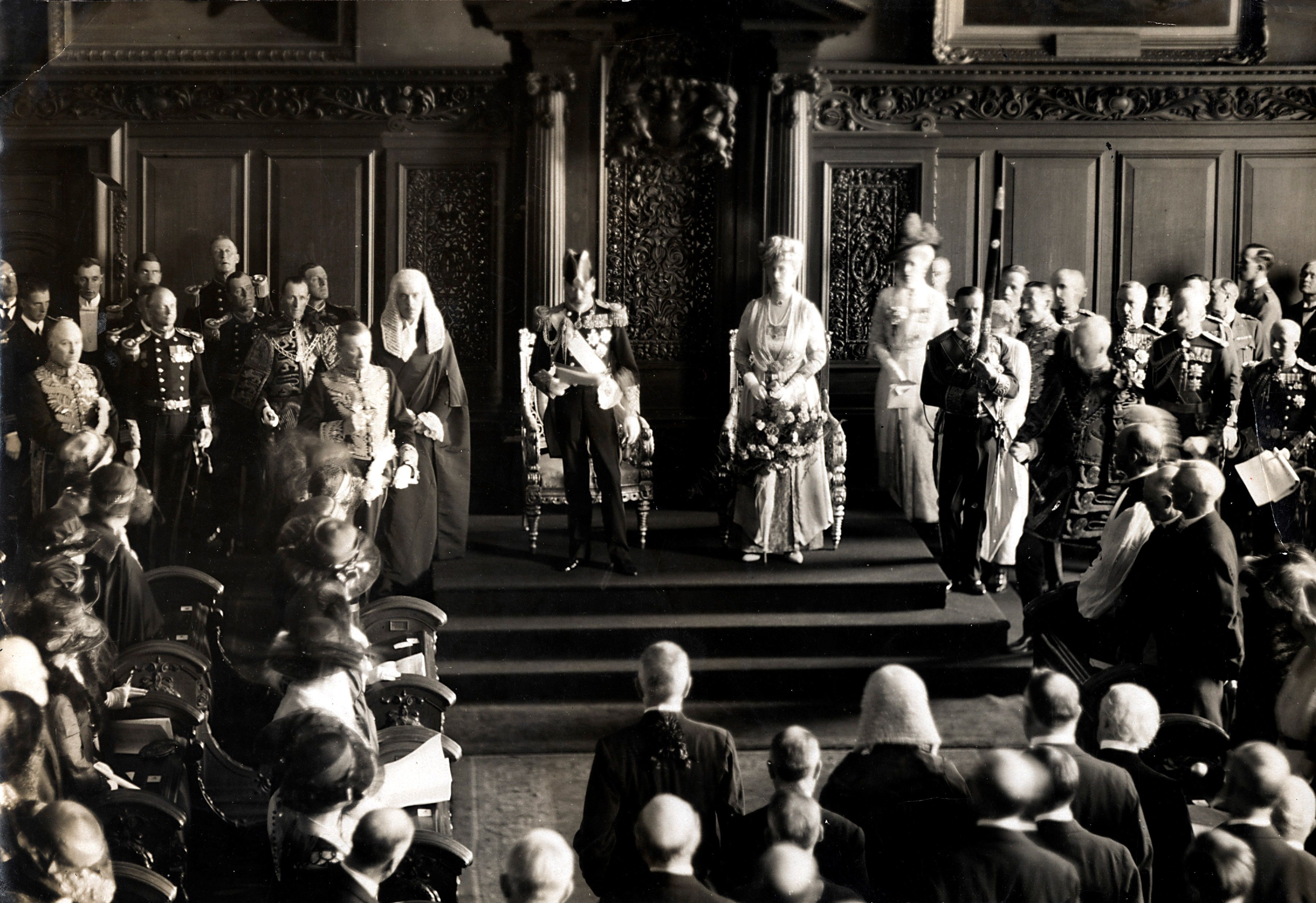
George V and Queen Mary during the opening of the Parliament of Northern Ireland (1921)

The 1921 general election was explicitly fought on the issue of partition, being in effect a referendum on approval of the concept of a Northern Ireland administration. Thereafter, general election timing was up to the Prime Minister. In the 1921 election the Nationalist Party did not take their seats, employing a policy of Abstentionism. Just before the election the southern nationalist (and future Father of the House (United Kingdom)) T. P. O'Connor made clear his feelings on nationalists taking their seats in the Parliament of Northern Ireland: "...the Nationalists are determined not to give even the fig leaf of respectability to the whole rotten arrangement by attending the [northern] Parliament." Elections almost always took place at a time when the issue of partition had been raised in a new crisis. This generally guaranteed the loyalty of Protestant voters to the Unionist Party. Independent Unionist candidates and the Northern Ireland Labour Party were usually accused of being splitters or dupes of the Nationalists.

The 1925 general election was called to tie in with the expected report of the Boundary Commission required by the Anglo-Irish Treaty of 1922. The Boundary Commission was expected to recommend the transfer of many border areas to the Irish Free State, and the Unionist election slogan was "Not an Inch!". They lost eight seats in Belfast and County Antrim, where the issue of the border had far less resonance. Sinn Féin had fought in 1921, but by 1925 was suffering the effects of its split over the Anglo-Irish Treaty. Éamon de Valera's Sinn Féin fought as Republicans but won only two seats. The border was never changed.

A minor row erupted in 1925 when the elections to the Senate took place. Eleven Unionists and one Labour Senator were elected, despite there being a block of three composed of two non-abstaining Nationalists and a dissident Unionist. The latter three had mailed their votes, but due to a public holiday and the practices of the postal service, they arrived an hour after the election. Requests for a recount were denied. (It is doubtful whether the three votes would have been sufficient to elect a Senator under the election system, since they would not have achieved a complete single transferable vote quota alone and the Unionist votes were likely to transfer so heavily to each other that the Nationalist candidate would not reach quota throughout the rounds of counting.) From later in 1925 to 1927, the Nationalist Party members took their seats for the first time.

For the 1929 general election the Unionists replaced the proportional representation system blamed for their bad performance in 1925. The new boundaries set the pattern for politics until Stormont was abolished; the Unionists never fell below 33 seats. In the 1930s, the phrase "A Protestant Parliament for a Protestant People" was a debated term. The 1938 general election was called when the prime minister of the United Kingdom Neville Chamberlain was negotiating a settlement of outstanding disputes with Éamon de Valera, whose new constitution laid claim to Northern Ireland, and the 1949 election was called when the Irish government declared itself a republic.

During the Second World War, the Stormont government called on Westminster to introduce conscription several times, as this was already the case in Great Britain. The British government consistently refused, remembering how a similar attempt in 1918 had backfired dramatically, as nationalist opposition made it unworkable. Much of the population of serving age were either in essential jobs or had already joined up voluntarily, making the potential yield of conscription low.

1965 saw a significant change, in that the Nationalists accepted office as the Official Opposition. This was intended as a reward for the attempts made by Terence O'Neill to end discrimination against Catholics and normalise relations with the Republic. However, the Unionists split over O'Neill's tentative reforms at the 1969 general election and Ian Paisley's Protestant Unionist Party began to win by-elections. The new nationalist party, the Social Democratic and Labour Party, withdrew from Stormont in July 1971 over the refusal of an inquiry into Royal Ulster Constabulary actions in Derry.

Stormont was abolished and Direct Rule from Westminster was introduced in March 1972, just six weeks after Bloody Sunday, when the Unionist government refused to hand over responsibility for law and order to Westminster. In its 50-year history, only one piece of legislation was passed that was introduced by a Nationalist member, the Wild Birds Protection Act. In October 1971, as the Troubles worsened, Gerard Newe had been appointed as a junior minister at Stormont, in an attempt to improve community relations. Fifty years after it came into existence, Newe was the first Catholic to serve in a Northern Ireland government, but because he was neither an MP nor a Senator, his appointment could last only six months.

The influence of the Orange Order in the governance of Northern Ireland was far-reaching. All of the six prime ministers of Northern Ireland were members of the Order, as were all but three cabinet ministers until 1969. Three of the ministers later left the Order, one because his daughter married a Catholic, one to become Minister of Community Relations in 1970, and the third was expelled for attending a Catholic religious ceremony. Of the 95 Stormont MPs who did not become cabinet ministers, 87 were Orangemen. Every unionist senator, with one exception, between 1921 and 1969 was an Orangeman. One of these senators, James Gyle, was suspended from the Order for seven years for visiting nationalist MP Joe Devlin on his deathbed.

A fully digitised copy of the Commons' debates (187,000 printed pages of Parliamentary Debates) is available online.

== See also ==
- Northern Ireland Assembly (1973)
- Northern Ireland Assembly
