= Ambrose O'Madden =

Irish Roman Catholic prelate

- Bishop of Clonfert
- Church: Catholic Church
- Diocese: Diocese of Clonfert
- In office: 28 August 1711 – July 1715
- Predecessor: Maurice Donnellan
- Successor: Edmund Kelly
- Previous post: Bishop of Kilmacduagh (1707-1711)

Orders
- Ordination: 1666
- Consecration: 15 April 1714 by Thaddeus Francis O'Rourke

Personal details
- Died: July 1715

Ambrose O'Madden (died 1715) was an Irish prelate of the Roman Catholic Church. He served as the Bishop of Clonfert from 1713 to 1715.

He was the parish priest of Loughrea when he was nominated Bishop of Killala and Apostolic Administrator of Kilmacduagh by the Sacred Congregation for the Propagation of the Faith on 30 August 1695. However, the nomination to Killala did not take effect, but he probably acted as administrator of Kilmacduagh. He was made Bishop of Kilmacduagh by Pope Clement XI on 15 November 1703, but the papal brief was delayed until 15 March 1707. Although appointed as Bishop of Kilmacduagh, he remained unconsecrated.

On 10 May 1707, Archbishop James Lynch of Tuam wrote to Pope Clement XI saying it would be more convenient for O'Madden to be translated from Kilmacduagh to Clonfert, since O'Madden's parish of Loughrea was in the Diocese of Clonfert. However, it was not judged best at that time, and O'Madden was allowed to retain his parish of Loughrea, along with the see of Kilmacduagh.

Six years later, O'Madden was elected Bishop of Clonfert by the Propagation of the Faith on 6 August, and was approved by Pope Clement XI on 22 August 1713. His papal brief was dated 15 September 1713. He was consecrated on 15 April 1714 by Thaddeus O'Rourke, Bishop of Killala.

Bishop O'Madden died in office in July 1715.

== Bibliography ==
- Brady, W. Maziere (1876). The Episcopal Succession in England, Scotland and Ireland, A.D. 1400 to 1875. Vol. 2. Rome: Tipografia Della Pace.
- Fryde, E. B.; Greenway, D. E.; Porter, S.; Roy, I., eds. (1986). Handbook of British Chronology (3rd, reprinted 2003 ed.). Cambridge: Cambridge University Press. ISBN 0-521-56350-X.

Catholic Church titles
Preceded by John de Burgo (vicar apostolic)	Bishop-designate of Killala; 1695	Succeeded by Thaddeus Francis O'Rourke (bishop)
Preceded by Michael Lynch (vicar apostolic)	Administrator of Kilmacduagh; 1695–1703/07	Succeeded by Francis de Burgo (bishop)
Preceded by Michael Lynch (vicar apostolic)	Bishop-designate of Kilmacduagh; 1703/07–1713	Succeeded by Francis de Burgo (bishop)
Preceded by Maurice Donnellan	Bishop of Clonfert; 1713–1715	Succeeded by Edmund Kelly
