= Cormac Ó Luimlín =

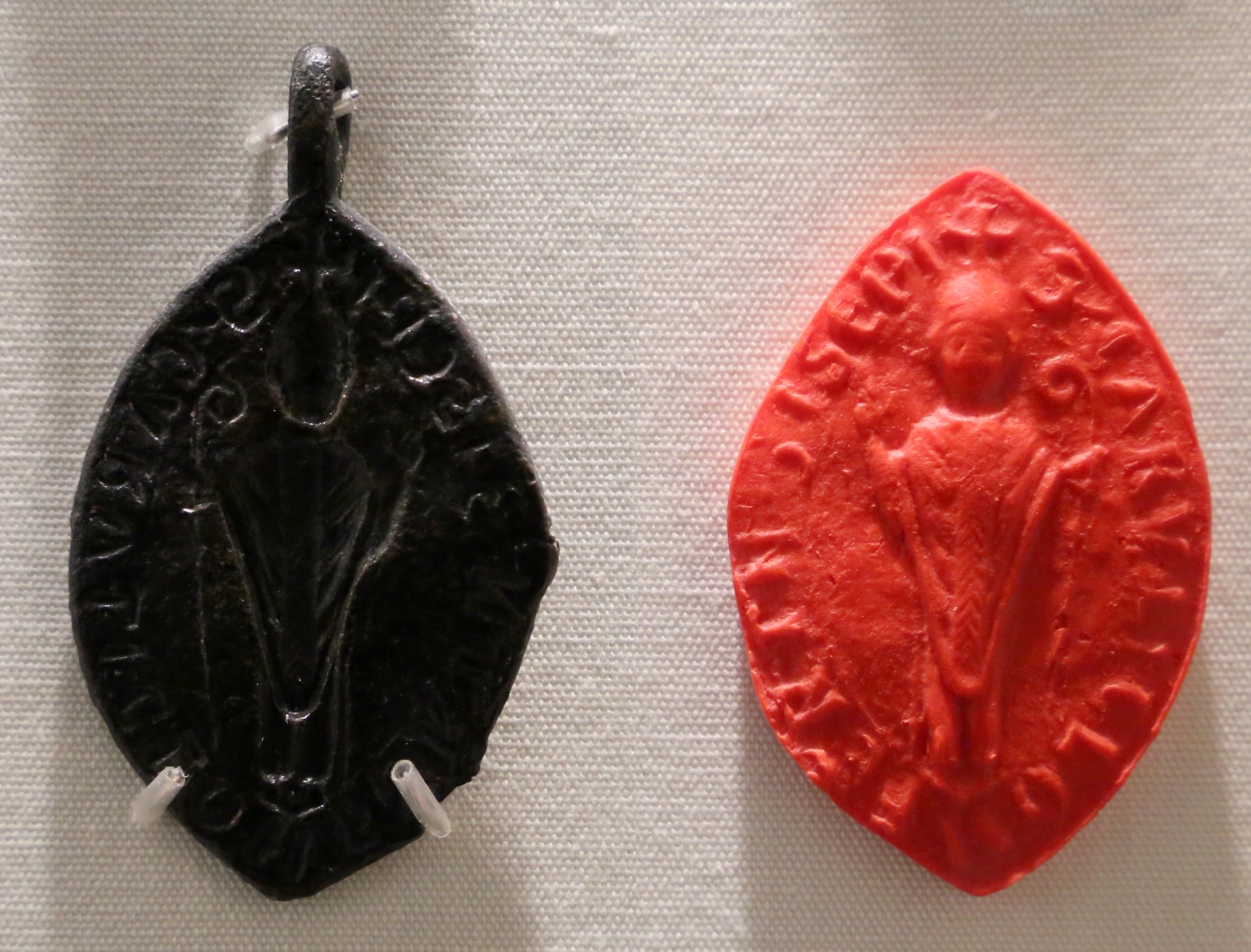
Seal of Cormac Ó Luimlín

Cormac Ó Luimlín, Bishop of Clonfert, died 19 June 1259.

This bishop bore the same surname as Cormac Ua Lumluini, lector of Cluain-fearta-Brenainn, the remnant of the sages of Ireland in his time, who, according to the Annals of the Four Masters, died in 1170.

== See also ==
- Catholic Church in Ireland

Catholic Church titles
Preceded by Muirchertach Ua Carmacáin	Bishops of Clonfert before 1224-1259	Succeeded by Tomás Ó Cellaigh
