= Muircheartach mac Pilib Ó Ceallaigh =

Medieval Irish archbishop

Muircheartach mac Pilib Ó Ceallaigh (Maurice O'Kelly; died 1407 or 1409) was Archbishop of Tuam in Ireland, and patron of the literary compilation An Leabhar Ua Maine. He was a son of Pilib Ó Ceallaigh, and a brother to William Buidhe Ó Cellaigh, King of Uí Maine and Chief of the Name (died c. 1381).

== Leabhar Ua Maine ==
While Bishop of Clonfert, Ó Ceallaigh commissioned the work known as Leabhar Ua Maine, written by ten scribes in Uí Maine before 1392 and after 1394. It includes a series of metrical dindsenchas, An Banshenchas, poems, genealogies and pedigrees. The largest single section is devoted to the origins and genealogies of the Ó Cellaigh dynasty of Ui Maine, its contents updated to the time of compilation. There were ten scribes, eight of whom are anonymous. It remained in the possession of the O'Kelly family till 1757.

== Archbishop ==
Ó Ceallaigh has been described as "a learned and witty prelate" and was in favour with the Pope. He was elected archbishop of Tuam in the summer of 1392, but not translated from Clonfert until 26 January 1393. He died 29 September 1407 or (according to Cotton) 1409.

Catholic Church titles
Preceded by Tommaltach Ó Conchobair	Archbishop of Tuam; 1393-1407	Succeeded by Malachias Hibernicus
Preceded by Tomás mac Gilbert Ó Cellaigh	Bishops of Clonfert; 1378-1393	Succeeded by Uilliam Ó Cormacáin
