= Muirchertach Ua Máel Uidir =

Muirchertach Ua Máel Uidir, Bishop of Clonfert, died 1187.

Ua Máel Uidir was Bishop of Clonmacnoise since about 1152. He was made Bishop of Clonfert in 1186, dying in office the following year.

== Sources ==
- The Surnames of Ireland, Edward MacLysaght, 1978.
- A New History of Ireland: Volume IX - Maps, Genealogies, Lists, ed. T.W. Moody, F.X. Martin, F.J. Byrne.

Catholic Church titles
Preceded by Celechair Ua hAirmedaig	Bishops of Clonfert; 1186-1187	Succeeded by Domnall Ua Finn
