= Máel Ísu Mac in Baird =

Bishop of clonfert

Máel Ísu Mac in Baird (died 1173) was a Bishop of Clonfert.

Máel Ísu Mac in Baird was a native of Soghain, a territory in western Ui Maine (now part of County Galway). From about his lifetime or earlier, members of the Mac an Bhaird would become professional poets and historians. The surname is now generally rendered as Ward.

== Sources ==
- The Surnames of Ireland, Edward MacLysaght, 1978.
- A New History of Ireland: Volume IX - Maps, Genealogies, Lists, ed. T.W. Moody, F.X. Martin, F.J. Byrne.

Catholic Church titles
Preceded by Petrus Ua Mórda	Bishops of Clonfert; 1172-1173	Succeeded by Celechair Ua hAirmedaig
