= Thomas Coen =

Irish bishop (1766–1847)

- Bishop of Clonfert
- Church: Catholic Church
- Diocese: Diocese of Clonfert
- In office: 9 October 1831 – 25 April 1847
- Predecessor: Thomas Costello
- Successor: John Derry
- Previous posts: Titular Bishop of Milevum (1816-1831); Coadjutor Bishop of Clonfert (1816-1831)

Orders
- Ordination: before 30 June 1795
- Consecration: 5 May 1816 by Oliver Kelly

Personal details
- Born: 1766 Fohenagh, County Galway, Kingdom of Ireland
- Died: 25 April 1847 (aged 80–81)

Thomas Coen (1766–1847) was an Irish prelate who served as Bishop of Clonfert.

He was born in Fohenagh. Coen was already ordained priest on 30 June 1795, when he was one of the first students to attend Maynooth College when it opened and continued his studies there for five years. Coen was appointed titular bishop of Milevum on 26 January 1816; and Diocesan Bishop of Clonfert on 8 October 1831. Dr Coen was one of the first Maynooth educated priests to be elevated to a bishopric. He died on 25 April 1847.

His brother James Coen also became a priest and served as parish priest in Lusmagh, County Offaly, and a nephew of his also called Thomas Coen, son of Bishop Coen's brother John, served as parish priest in Killoran, and Abbeygormican, Co. Galway.

Catholic Church titles
Preceded by Thomas Costello	Bishop of Clonfert; 1831–1847	Succeeded by John Derry
