= Tomás Ó Cellaigh =

Irish bishop (died 1263)

Tomás Ó Cellaigh was a Catholic Bishop of Clonfert. His death is recorded as 6 January 1263. O Cellaigh was elected to that position sometime prior to 7 November 1259, as he received possession of temporalities commencing on that date.

His name is also recorded as Tomás mac Domnaill Móir Ó Cellaig. He was probably from Ui Maine.

Preceded by Cormac Ó Luimlín	Bishops of Clonfert before 1259-1263	Succeeded by Johannes de Alatre
