= Richard Nangle =

Irish bishop

Richard Nangle (died c.1541) D.D., Provincial of the Order of Saint Augustine in Ireland was Bishop of Clonfert between 1536 and 1541.

Catholic Church titles
Preceded by Dionysius Ó Mórdha	Bishop of Clonfert; 1536–1541	Succeeded by Roland de Burgo
