= A Protestant parliament for a Protestant people =

British political phrases

"A Protestant parliament for a Protestant people" is a term that has been applied to the political institutions in Northern Ireland between 1921 and 1972. The term has been documented as early as February 1939, when Bishop Daniel Mageean, in his Lenten pastoral, stated that prime minister, James Craig had adopted the words as his slogan.

The implication was that Irish Catholics had no political status in the country. Many of them supported the Nationalist Party that chose a policy of abstentionism between 1921 and 1965, resulting in a large majority of Protestant members. They also alleged that local gerrymandering had increased since 1921.

== Actual quotation ==
The original similar phrase was published in the 1934 Northern Irish parliamentary debates (volume 16).

A bitter debate arose in the Parliament of Northern Ireland on 24 April 1934 on the rights of the minority (the minority in Northern Ireland being Nationalist supporters, who were mostly Catholic), itemising how these had generally deteriorated since 1921. Craig denied the assertions at length, ending with:

Since we took up office we have tried to be absolutely fair towards all the citizens of Northern Ireland. Actually, on an Orange platform, I, myself, laid down the principle, to which I still adhere, that I was Prime Minister not of one section of the community but of all, and that as far as I possibly could I was going to see that fair play was meted out to all classes and creeds without any favour whatever on my part.

George Leeke of the Nationalist Party retorted: "What about your Protestant Parliament?"

Craig replied:

The hon. Member must remember that in the South they boasted of a Catholic State. They still boast of Southern Ireland being a Catholic State. All I boast of is that we are a Protestant Parliament and a Protestant State. It would be rather interesting for historians of the future to compare a Catholic State launched in the South with a Protestant State launched in the North and to see which gets on the better and prospers the more. It is most interesting for me at the moment to watch how they are progressing. I am doing my best always to top the bill and to be ahead of the South.

== Similar usage ==
A similar phrase that he used was "That is my whole object in carrying on a Protestant Government for a Protestant people". The correct phrase was quoted by Jonathan Bardon, and Professor Ronan Fanning, but the common misquotation has been relayed by eminent historians such as Diarmaid Ferriter, Seán Cronin, Patrick Buckland and Mark Tierney, to the extent that "A Protestant Parliament for a Protestant People" has now become very widely accepted as the actual quotation.

In 1967, prime minister, Terence O'Neill also misattributed the phrase itself to his predecessor, but strongly argued that it was no longer representative of the then present spirit of Ulster Unionism. Newspapers continued to use the term in the 1970s and 1980s, particularly in relation to the former Stormont Parliament.
