= Muiredach Ua hÉnlainge =

Irish bishop (died 1117)

Muiredach Ua hÉnlainge was a Bishop of Clonfert who died in 1117.

Preceded by Eochu mac Scolaige	Bishops of Clonfert unknown–1117	Succeeded by Gilla Pátraic Ua hAilchinned
