= Seaán Ó hEidhin =

Irish bishop

Seaán Ó hEidhin, Franciscan Bishop of Clonfert, fl. 1437–1459.

Ó hEidhin was a descendant of Eidhean mac Cléireach of the Uí Fiachrach Aidhne dynasty. He was a suffragan bishop, first noted as an attendant of King Henry VI in 1437. He acted as the king's messenger between the rebellious clergy assembled at Basel who were eager to prove that the Pope was subordinate to the General Council; to the Holy Roman Emperor; Sigismund, Archduke of Austria; and to Pope Eugenius IV.

He never took actual possession of his office, it been taken by Tomás mac Muircheartaigh Ó Cellaigh, son of Bishop Muircheartaigh Ó Cellaigh. At the time of Ó Cellaigh's death in 1441, John White, provincial minister of the Friars Minor was deposed from his position for bad government. He traveled to Rome and was appointed to Ó Cellaigh's position, which he held till his death in 1447, leaving Ó hEidhin a bishop without a diocese. He worked as a suffragan or auxiliary bishop in Worcester (1443), London, (1443–1448), Exeter (1447), and was at the time of his death vicar of West Thurrock, near London.
