= Celechair Ua hAirmedaig =

Celechair Ua hAirmedaig, Bishop of Clonfert, died 1186.

Preceded by Máel Ísu Mac in Baird	Bishops of Clonfert before 1179-1186	Succeeded by Muirchertach Ua Máel Uidir
