= John Derry (bishop) =

Roman Catholic bishop (1811–1870)

- Bishop of Clonfert
- Church: Catholic Church
- Diocese: Diocese of Clonfert
- In office: 9 July 1847 – 2 July 1870
- Predecessor: Thomas Coen
- Successor: Patrick Duggan

Orders
- Ordination: 1834
- Consecration: 21 September 1847 by John MacHale

Personal details
- Born: 19 June 1811 County Roscommon, United Kingdom of Great Britain and Ireland
- Died: 2 July 1870 (aged 59) Brideswell, County Roscommon, United Kingdom of Great Britain and Ireland

John Derry (19 June 1811 – 2 July 1870) was an Irish prelate who served as Bishop of Clonfert. He was born in the Hermitage, Moore, Co. Roscommon, close to Ballinasloe, Co. Galway. Educated privately at an academy run by John O’Farrell, he went to Maynooth College to study for the priesthood. Derry was ordained priest in 1834. Derry was consecrated Bishop of Clonfert on 21 September 1847, a post he held until his death. He served as a Council father at the First Vatican Council, and returning to Ireland he received medical treatment for a heart condition in Dublin, however he died at his sister's residence in Brideswell on 2 July 1870.

Catholic Church titles
| Preceded by Thomas Coen | Bishop of Clonfert; 1847–1870 | Succeeded by Patrick Duggan |
