= Edmund Kelly (bishop) =

Irish prelate

- Bishop of Clonfert
- Church: Catholic Church
- Diocese: Diocese of Conflert
- In office: 12 February 1718 – 1732
- Predecessor: Ambrose O’Madden
- Successor: Peter O'Donnellan

Orders
- Consecration: 14 May 1718

Personal details
- Born: 1658 County Galway, Kingdom of Ireland
- Died: 1732 (aged 73–74)

Edmund Kelly (1658-1732) was an Irish prelate who served as Bishop of Clonfert.

Kelly was born in County Galway. was selected as Clonfert on 3 July 1717, and consecrated on 14 May 1718. He died in 1732.

Catholic Church titles
Preceded by Ambrose O'Madden	Bishop of Clonfert; 1718–1732	Succeeded by Peter O'Donnellan
