= Henry Ó Cormacáin =

16th-century Irish abbot

Henry Ó Cormacáin, last Abbot of Clonfert, fl. c. 1534-c. 1567.

Ó Cormacáin was a member of an ecclesiastical family based in Síol Anmchadha, in what is now south-east County Galway. Two members of the family served as Bishop of Clonfert - Muirchertach Ua Carmacáin (died 1203) and Uilliam Ó Cormacáin (died 1398).

The family appear to have founded an abbey in the parish of Abbeygormican, from which it takes its name, sometime prior to 1309.

Writing from Loughrea on 5 November 1838, John O'Donovan gave the following account of Abbot Henry Ó Cormacáin:

"Henry O'Gormacain was abbot, at the time of the general suppression on Monastries. He never surrendered the abbey [Clonfert] but continued seized of the temporalities of it till his death, notwithstanding the king had, on the 24th of November in the 35 (XXV(? sic) year of his reign, united them for ever to the bishoprick. Immediately on the death of Henry, William O'Gormacain supported by the sept of the O'Maddens procured the abbey from the popu and kept quiet possession thereof till about the year 1657."

Clonfert Abbey eventually came to be held by the Earl of Clanricarde.

O'Donovan noted that the surname Cormican was then still in existence in the parish of Abbeygormican.

== See also ==
- Ua Corcrain of Clonfert
