= Dionysius Ó Mórdha =

Irish bishop

Dionysius Ó Mórdha, Bishop of Clonfert, died 1534.

Preceded by David de Burgo	Bishops of Clonfert; 1509–1534	Succeeded by Richard Nangle
