= Cormac mac Connmhach =

Cormac mac Connmhach (died 867) was a scribe.

Cormac mac Connmhach was alive three hundred years after the foundation of Clonfert by Brendan in 553. He is described as an oeconomus, scribe, and wise man and does not seem to have been either bishop or abbot of Clonfert. Of his scriptorial work, nothing is known to survive. Nor does it seem to be known from what people he originated.
