= John Curry (historian) =

Irish doctor of medicine, historian, and Roman Catholic activist

John Curry (born in the first quarter of the eighteenth century in Dublin, Ireland; died 1780 also in Dublin, Ireland) was an Irish doctor of medicine, historian, and Roman Catholic activist. Curry was one of the founders of the Irish Catholic Committee.

== Life ==
Curry studied medicine at Paris and Reims, then returned to Dublin to practise his profession. Anti-Catholic legislation barred Catholics from most forms of schooling, but it was not unusual for wealthy families to break the law and arrange for their children to be educated abroad.

In 1743, Curry published the first of two early books on the nature of fever.

As an ardent Catholic, Curry was troubled by the anti-Catholic historiography hegemonic in his day and resolved to refute the various and sundry "calumnies". The result was his Brief Account from the most authentic Protestant writers of the Irish Rebellion, 1641, first published in London in 1747. The book was bitterly attacked by Walter Harris in a 1752 volume published in Dublin, and in reply Curry published his Historical Memoirs, afterwards enlarged and published in 1775 under the title An Historical and Critical Review of the Civil Wars in Ireland. In the Review, his most important publication, Curry provides a brief summary of the developments in Ireland after the invasion of Henry II of England, then discusses the developments from the reign of Elizabeth I of England and to the Settlement under William III of England. A second edition, extended from Curry's manuscript by Charles O'Conor, was published in Dublin in 1786. Originally printed in two volumes, the O'Conor edition went on to be reprinted as a single volume in 1810.

Curry took a prominent part in the campaign of the Irish Catholics for the repeal of the Penal Laws against Irish Catholics. In the late 1750s, together with Charles O'Connor and Thomas Wyse, Curry became one of the founders of the Irish Catholic Committee.

Curry was one of 49 physicians and chirurgeons who declared their public support for the construction of a Publick Bath in Dublin in May 1771 and named Achmet Borumborad as a well qualified individual for carrying such a scheme into existence.

== Selected publications ==
- Curry, John (1743). An essay on ordinary fevers. : And the methods to be used, to prevent their becoming so grievous, and mortal, as they are often found to be. In three parts. By John Curry, M.D. London: printed for J. Robinson at the Golden Lion in Ludgate-Street, and sold by the other booksellers and publishers of London and Westminster.
- Curry, John (1744). Some Thoughts on the Nature of Fevers. London.
- Curry, John (1770). Historical memoirs of the Irish rebellion, in the year 1641 : Extracted from Parliamentary journals, State-Acts, and the most eminent Protestant historians. Together with an appendix, Containing Several authentic Papers relating to this Rebellion, not referred to in these Memoirs. In a letter to Walter Harris, Esq;. Dublin: printed for J. Hoey, Jun. at the Mercury, in Parliament-Street.
- Curry, John (1771). Observations on the popery laws. Dublin.
- Curry, John; O'Conor, Charles (1786). An historical and critical review of the civil wars in Ireland, : from the reign of Queen Elizabeth, to the Settlement under King William. With the state of the Irish Catholics, from that settlement to the relaxation of the popery laws, in the year 1778. Extracted from Parliamentary Records, State Acts, and other Authentic Materials. By John Curry, M.D. In two volumes (2nd ed.). London: printed for G. G. J. and J. Robinson, and J. Murray.
