= Roland de Burgo =

Irish cleric and Bishop of Clonfert and Elphin (died 1580)

- Church: Church of Ireland
- See: Bishop of Elphin
- In office: 1551–1580
- Predecessor: Conach O'Shiel
- Successor: Thomas Chester
- Other posts: Bishop of Clonfert; Dean of Clonfert

Orders
- Consecration: 8 June 1537

Personal details
- Born: Roland Burke
- Died: 20 June 1580
- Parents: Redmond Burke

Roland de Burgo (died 20 June 1580) was an Irish Church of Ireland cleric who was Dean of Clonfert, Bishop of Clonfert (1534–1580) and Bishop of Elphin (1551–1580).

== Background ==
Burke or de Burgo, was the grandson of Ulick Fionn Burke, 6th Clanricarde (d. 1509) who had fought at the Battle of Knockdoe in 1504. He was a descendant of the House of Burgh: the surname "de Burgo" is the latinised form of this name (with the gaelicised form being de Búrca or Búrc, later Burke).

== Career ==
De Burgo was the papal nominee for the See of Clonfert since 1534, when he was Dean of Clonfert, and was consecrated on 8 June 1537. He accepted royal supremacy in 1538 and was confirmed or re-appointed by King Henry VIII on 24 October 1541. De Burgo acknowledged papal authority in the reign of Queen Mary I, but again accepted royal supremacy under Queen Elizabeth I. He was described by the papal legate Fr David Wolfe, S.J. as an 'adherent of the Queen' in a letter of 12 October 1561. This letter has also been translated that he had 'taken the oath of allegiance to the queen'. He retained the deanery in commendam.

He was, from 23 November 1551, also Bishop of Elphin until his death. The Annals of the Four Masters record his obituary as follows:

Roland, the son of Redmond, son of Ulick Burke of Knocktua, Bishop of Clonfert, died; and the loss of this good man was the cause of great lamentation in his own country.

== See also ==
- House of Burgh, an Anglo-Norman and Hiberno-Norman dynasty founded in 1193
- Church of Ireland

Preceded by Conach O'Shiel	Bishop of Elphin; 1551–1580	Succeeded by Thomas Chester
Preceded by Richard Nangle	Bishop of Clonfert; 1538–1580	Succeeded by Stephen Kirwan
