= Kilmactranny =

Civil parish in County Sligo, Ireland

Coordinates: 54°35′8″N 8°15′14″W

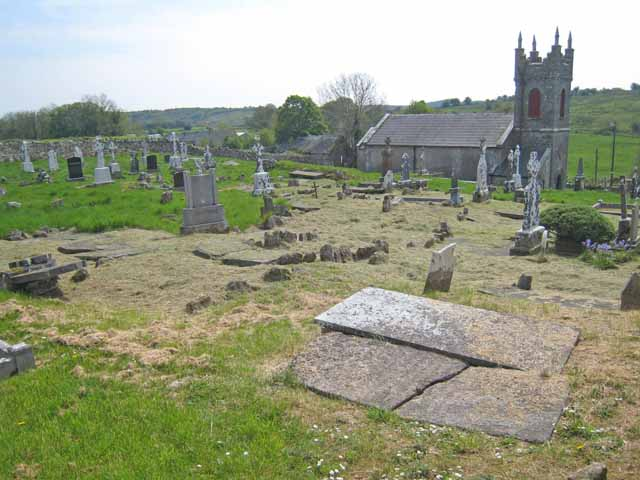
Church of Ireland, Kilmactranny

Kilmactranny (Irish: Cill Mhic Treana, meaning 'Mac Tranny's church'), also Kilmactrany, is a civil parish in the barony of Tireragh in County Sligo, Ireland, on the border with counties Leitrim and Roscommon. It has an area of 2,643 hectares.
