= Uilliam Ó Cormacáin =

14th-century Archbishop of Tuam, Ireland

Uilliam Ó Cormacáina, Archbishop of Tuam 5 May 1386 – 1393.

Ó Cormacáin was a member of an ecclesiastical family based in Síol Anmchadha, in what is now south-east County Galway. Muirchertach Ua Carmacáin (died 1203) served as Bishop of Clonfert, as did Uilliam after becoming Archbishop.

== See also ==
- Henry Ó Cormacáin

Catholic Church titles
Preceded by Gregorius Ó Mocháin II	Archbishop of Tuam; 1386-1393	Succeeded by Muircheartach mac Pilib Ó Ceallaigh
Preceded by Muircheartach mac Pilib Ó Ceallaigh	Bishops of Clonfert; 1393-1398	Succeeded by David Corre
