= Ballindoon Friary =

Monastery in County Sligo, Ireland

Coordinates: 54.082832°N 8.323308°W

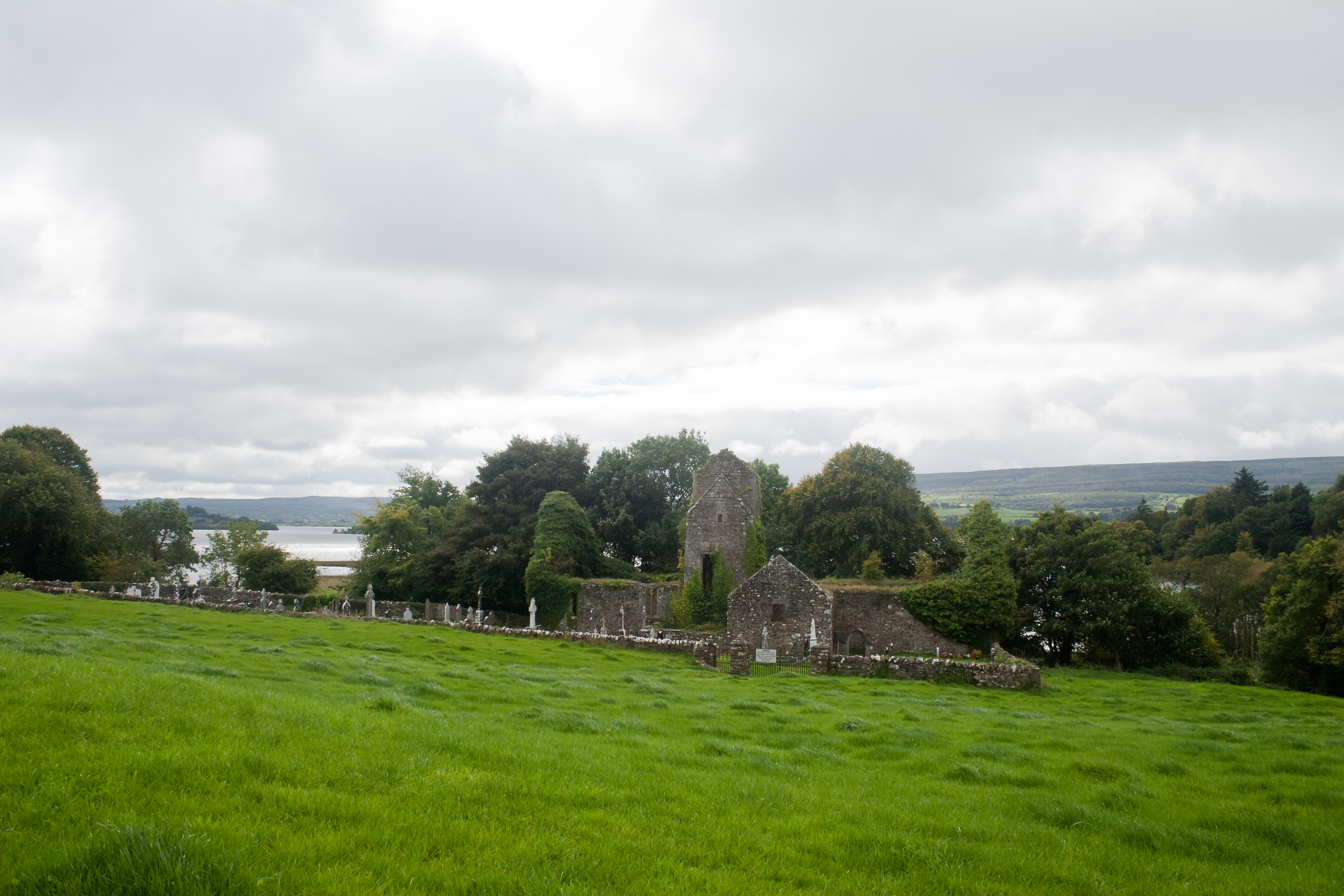
Ballindoon Priory in front of Lough Arrow

Ballindoon (Irish: Baile an Dúin) Friary was a Dominican priory beside Lough Arrow in County Sligo, Ireland. It was dedicated to St. Mary and founded in 1507 by Thomas O'Farrell. It was dissolved c. 1585 and is now in ruins.

== See also ==
- List of abbeys and priories in Ireland (County Sligo)
