= Bellanagare =

Village in County Roscommon, Ireland

Bellanagare Béal Átha na gCarr
- Village
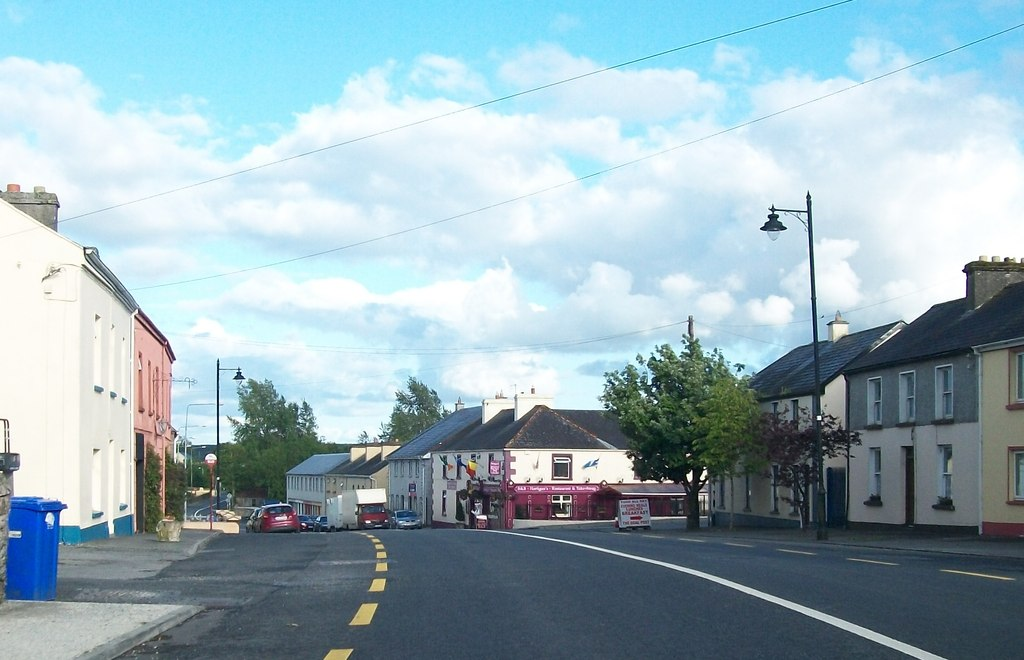
- River Oaks (part of the N5 road, the main road through Bellanagare) in 2011

- Location in Ireland
- Coordinates: 53°50′14″N 8°22′56″W
- Country: Ireland
- Province: Connacht
- County: County Roscommon
- Elevation: 60 m (200 ft)

Population (2016)
  - Total: 153
- Time zone: UTC+0 (WET)
  - Summer (DST): UTC-1 (IST (WEST))
- Irish Grid Reference: M745876

Bellanagare (Irish: Béal Átha na gCarr, meaning 'ford-mouth of the carts') or Ballinagare is a village in County Roscommon, Ireland. It is between Tulsk and Frenchpark on the N5 road, which goes from Dublin to Castlebar/Westport.

== History ==
=== Built heritage ===
Evidence of ancient settlement in the area includes several ringfort, enclosure, standing stone and Ogham stone sites in the townlands of Bellanagare, Drummin and Kilcorkey. Bellanagare Castle, located in Bellanagare townland and historically associated with the O'Conor family, was surrounded by a bawn wall and was the site of a later house.

=== O'Conor Don ===
The O'Conor Don ancestral lands were in County Roscommon centred on Clonalis House near Castlerea in County Roscommon. When Alexander O'Conor Don died in 1820 without a male heir, the title was inherited by the O'Conors of Bellanagare. In 1828, O'Conor Don of Belanagar was a member of the Grand Panel of County Roscommon. At the time of Griffith's Valuation (1860s), Charles Owen O'Conor was one of the principal lessors in the parishes of Kilcorkey and Kilkeevin, barony of Castlereagh.

=== Charles O'Connor ===
Charles O'Conor, of Belanagare, was a scholar and antiquary who was born in 1710. In 1754 he published a work on Irish mining, and in 1766 he published the work for which he is best known, Dissertations on the History of Ireland. O'Conor died at Belanagare on 1 July 1791, and his collection of manuscripts (containing the only then known original of the first part of the Annals of the Four Masters), passed into the hands of the Marquis of Buckingham.

=== Hermitage House ===
Hermitage House was built by Charles O'Conor circa 1760, and the former O'Conor family residence at Bellanagare Castle subsequently fell into ruin. Hermitage House, built some distance away, was a smaller Georgian house which O'Conor referred to as his "hermitage". At Hermitage House, he devoted his time to the collection and study of Irish manuscripts, the publication of dissertations, and the cause of Irish and Catholic emancipation. His great-great-grandson, also Charles O'Conor, was leasing the property at Ballaghcullia, valued at £10, to Honoria O'Conor at the time of Griffith's Valuation in 1868. As of the 21st century, Hermitage House is still extant though not occupied and a modern bungalow has been constructed in front of it.

== Sport and community ==
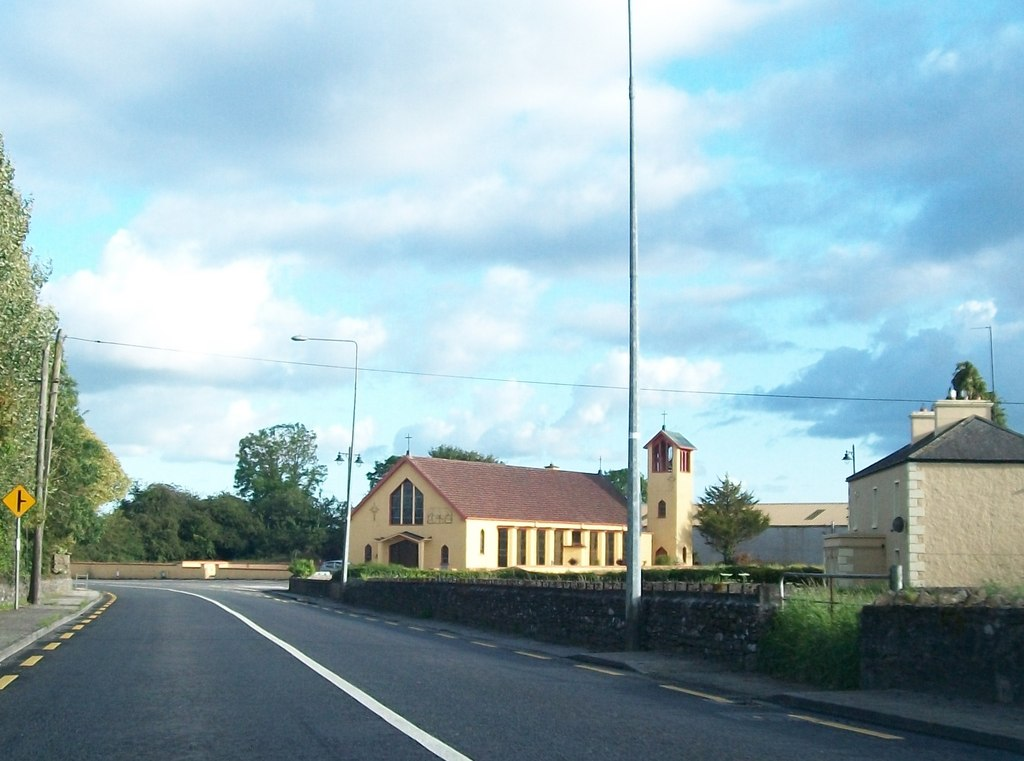
Bellanagare's Roman Catholic church

Ballinagare Community Centre, a community-run centre for the village and surrounding area, runs leisure activities and has a gym, and astro turf pitch.

Ballinagare Football Club, an association football club which was established in 2004, plays its home games at Ballinagare Community Pitch beside the community centre. The club colours are orange with a black trim

Other sports clubs in the area include the Western Gaels GAA Club. This Gaelic Athletic Association club was formed in Fairymount Hall in 1962. The club's catchment area consists of the parishes of Frenchpark and Fairymount in West Roscommon, close to the towns of Castlerea and Ballaghaderreen. The club's crest includes images of several landmarks from the area, including Mount Druid House near Ballinagare.

Ballinagare Horse and Pony Racing club was established in 2012.

== People ==
- Pádraig Ó Caoimh (1897–1964), soldier and secretary of the Gaelic Athletic Association
- Charles O'Conor (1710–1791), antiquarian and activist for Catholic Emancipation
- Douglas Hyde (1860–1949), the first President of Ireland, was from the area and attended fairs in Bellanagare
- Andrew McDermot (1790–1881), fur trader with the Hudson's Bay Company.

== See also ==
- List of towns and villages in Ireland
