= Muirchertach Ua Carmacáin =

Muirchertach Ua Carmacáin, Bishop of Clonfert, 1195-1203.

Ó Cormacáin was a member of an ecclesiastical family based in Síol Anmchadha, in what is now south-east County Galway. Later members of the family were bishops of Clonfert and Archbishop of Tuam, as well as Abbots of the abbey of Abbeygormican in that county.

== See also ==
- Uilliam Ó Cormacáin
- Henry Ó Cormacáin

Preceded by Domnall Ua Finn	Bishops of Clonfert; 1195-1203	Succeeded by Máel Brigte Ua hEruráin
