= Bishop of Clonfert =

Episcopal title

The Bishop of Clonfert (Irish: Easpag Chluain Fearta) is an episcopal title which takes its name after the village of Clonfert in County Galway, Ireland. In the Roman Catholic Church it remains as a separate title; but in the Church of Ireland it has been united with other bishoprics.

== History ==
The diocese of Clonfert was one of the twenty-four dioceses established at the Synod of Rathbreasail in 1111, and its boundaries were fixed at the Synod of Kells in 1152. During the Reformation, the bishops changed their allegiance back and forth between the Pope and the Crown. After the Reformation, there were parallel apostolic successions.

In the Church of Ireland, the title continued until 1625, when it united with Kilmacduagh, forming the united see of Clonfert and Kilmacduagh.

In the Roman Catholic Church, the title remains a separate bishopric. The current incumbent is the Most Reverend Michael Duignan, Bishop of the Roman Catholic Diocese of Clonfert, who was appointed on 16 July 2019 and ordained bishop on 13 October 2019. In 2021 the Holy See determined that the diocese of Clonfert and the Roman Catholic Diocese of Galway, Kilmacduagh and Kilfenora would share a bishop.

== Pre-Reformation bishops ==
Pre-Reformation Bishops of Clonfert
From	Until	Ordinary	Notes
unknown	1117	Muiredach Ua hÉnlainge	Died in office
unknown	1149	Gilla Pátraic Ua hAilchinned	Died in office
c.1150	1171	Petrus Ua Mórda, O.Cist.	Died 27 December 1171
1172	1173	Máel Ísu Mac in Baird	Died in office
bef.1179	1186	Celechair Ua hAirmedaig	Died in office
1186	1187	Muirchertach Ua Máel Uidir	Bishop of Clonmacnoise since c. 1152; also became Bishop of Clonfert in 1186; died in office
unknown	1195	Domnall Ua Finn	Died in office
unknown	1203	Muirchertach Ua Carmacáin	Died in office
1205	unknown	Máel Brigte Ua hEruráin	Elected in 1205
bef.1224	1259	Cormac Ó Luimlín	Died c. 19 June 1259; also known as Carus
1259	1263	Tomás Ó Cellaigh	Elected before 7 November 1259 and received possession of temporalities after that date; died 6 January 1263; also recorded as Tomás mac Domnaill Móir Ó Cellaig
1263	1266	See vacant	
1266	1295	Johannes de Alatre	Appointed before 29 September 1266 and received possession of temporalities on that date; consecrated 19 December 1266; translated to Benevento 2 October 1295
1296	1307	Robert, O.S.B.	Appointed 2 January and consecrated after 21 April 1296; received possession of temporalities 24 September 1296; acted as a suffragan bishop in the diocese of Canterbury 1296–1307; died after December 1307
1308	1319	Gregorius Ó Brócaig	Elected before 22 March 1308 and received possession of temporalities after that date; died in office
1320	1321	Robert Petit, O.F.M.	Elected 10 February and confirmed by the king 24 February 1320; consecrated c. 1320; deprived c. 1321; acted as a suffragan bishop in the dioceses of Worcester 1322 and Exeter 1324; later appointed Bishop of Annaghdown 27 October 1325; also known as Robert Le Petit
1322	1336	Seoán Ó Leaáin	Elected 10 November 1319, but was not appointed until 6 August 1322; consecrated 20 September and received possession of temporalities 29 December 1322; died 7 April 1336
1336	1347	See vacant	
1347	1378	Tomás mac Gilbert Ó Cellaigh	Became bishop before 14 October 1347; died 1378; also known as Thomas O'Kelly
1378	1393	Muircheartach mac Pilib Ó Ceallaigh	Appointed before 6 March 1378 and consecrated in the same year; translated to Tuam 26 January 1393; also known as Mauricius
1393	1398	Uilliam Ó Cormacáin	Translated from Tuam 27 January 1393; deprived in 1398; also known as Wiliam Ó Cormacáin
1398		David Corre, O.F.M.	Appointed 20 March 1398, but did not take effect
1398	1405	Énri Ó Connmhaigh	Appointed c. July 1398; translated to Kilmacduagh 11 March 1405
1405	1438	Tomás mac Muircheartaigh Ó Cellaigh, O.P.	Translated from Ardfert and Aghadoe 11 March 1405; translated to Tuam 15 July 1438
1410		Cobhthach Ó Madagáin	Elected in 1410, but was not consecrated
1438	1459	Seaán Ó hEidhin, O.F.M.	Appointed 18 July 1438 and again 25 October 1441; acted as a suffragan bishop in the dioceses of London, Diocese of Exeter, and Worcester 1443–59; died after 1459
1441	1448	John White, O.F.M.	Appointed 25 October 1441, but did not obtain possession of the see; resigned in July 1448
1447	1448	Conchobair Ó Maolalaidh, O.F.M.	Appointed 22 May 1447 and again 18 July 1448; translated to Emly 30 August 1448; also known as Cornelius
1448	1463	Cornelius Ó Cuinnlis, O.F.M.	Translated from Emly 30 August 1448; resigned in 1463; died after 1469
1463	1507	Matthaeus Mág Raith, O.S.A.	Appointed 22 June 1463; died in office
1508	1509	David de Burgo	Appointed 5 July 1508; died in office
1509	1534	Dionysius Ó Mórdha, O.P.	Appointed 7 November 1509; died office; also known as Denis O'More

== Bishops during the Reformation ==
Bishops of Clonfert during the Reformation
From	Until	Ordinary	Notes
1534	1580	Roland de Burgo	Appointed by Pope Clement VII 18 May 1534; accepted royal supremacy in 1538; confirmed (re-appointed) by King Henry VIII 24 October 1541; acknowledged papal authority in the reign of Queen Mary I, but again accepted royal supremacy under Queen Elizabeth I; also was Bishop of Elphin 1551–1580; died 20 June 1580; also known as Roland Burke
1536	1538	Richard Nangle	Appointed by King Henry VIII; consecrated 1536; expelled before July 1538 by the papal nominee who had accepted royal supremacy

== Post-Reformation bishops ==
=== Church of Ireland succession ===
Church of Ireland Bishops of Clonfert
From	Until	Ordinary	Notes
1582	1601	Stephen Kirwan	Translated from Kilmacduagh; nominated 30 March 1582; letters patent 24 May 1582; died before 4 November 1601; also known as Stephen Kerovan
1602	1625	Roland Lynch, Bishop of Kilmacduagh	Held the see of Clonfert "in commendam" from 1602 until his death in 1625
In 1625, the Church of Ireland sees of Clonfert and Kilmacduagh were amalgamated, forming the united Bishopric of Clonfert and Kilmacduagh.

=== Roman Catholic succession ===
Roman Catholic Bishops of Clonfert
From	Until	Ordinary	Notes
1580	1587	See vacant	
1587	1602	Thady Farrell, O.P.	Appointed 8 June and consecrated 30 August 1587; also appointed an Auxiliary bishop of Sigüenza in 1589; died 1602; also known as Tadhg O'Farrell, Tadhg MacEoga and Tadeo O'Farrell
appointed 1609		(Dermot Nolan)	Appointed vicar apostolic by papal brief 4 February 1609
appointed 1622		(Thady Egan)	Appointed vicar apostolic by papal brief 13 July 1622
1629	1647	John de Burgh	Appointed vicar apostolic by papal brief 13 October 1629, and appointed bishop 16 September 1641; translated to Tuam 11 March 1647; also recorded as John de Burgo and John Burke
1647	1663	Walter Lynch	Arrived in Ireland in 1647; appointed 11 March 1647 and consecrated 9 April 1648; left Ireland c. 1648 and spent the rest of his life in Hungary; died 14 July 1663
1663	1678	See vacant	
1678	1687	Thady Keogh, O.P.	Appointed 13 July and consecrated in October 1671; died in office; also known as Tadhg Keogh or Mac Eogha
1687	1695	See vacant	
1695	1706	Maurice Donnellan	Appointed 14 November 1695; died 2 July 1706; also known as Murtagh Donnellan or Muircheartach Ó Domhnalláin
1706	1713	See vacant	
1713	1715	Ambrose O'Madden	Previously bishop-designate of Killala and Kilmacduagh; appointed bishop of Clonfert 15 September 1713 and consecrated 15 April 1714; died in July 1715
1715	1718	See vacant	
1718	1733	Edmund Kelly	Appointed in February and consecrated before 14 May 1718; died in office
1733	1778	Peter O'Donnellan	Appointed 11 August 1733; died 7 May 1778
1778	1786	Andrew O'Donellan	Appointed coadjutor bishop 1 December 1776; succeeded 7 May 1778; died before 6 July 1786
1786	1831	Thomas Costello	Appointed coadjutor bishop 30 June 1786; succeeded 6 July 1786; died 8 October 1831
1831	1847	Thomas Coen	Appointed coadjutor bishop 26 January and consecrated 5 May 1816; succeeded 8 October 1831; died 25 April 1847
1847	1870	John Derry	Appointed 9 July and consecrated 21 September 1847; died 28 June 1870
1871		(Hugh O'Rorke)	Appointed 13 February 1871 but was not accepted
1872	1896	Patrick Duggan	Appointed 2 October 1871 and consecrated 14 January 1872; died 15 August 1896
1896	1903	John Healy	Appointed coadjutor bishop 26 June and consecrated 31 August 1884; succeeded 15 August 1896; translated to Tuam 13 February 1903
1903	1909	Thomas O'Dea	Appointed 12 June and consecrated 30 August 1903; translated to Galway and Kilmacduagh 29 April 1909
1909	1918	Thomas Gilmartin	Appointed 3 July 1909 and consecrated 13 February 1910; translated to Tuam 10 July 1918
1919	1923	Thomas O'Doherty	Appointed 3 July and consecrated 14 September 1919; translated to Galway and Kilmacduagh 13 July 1923
1924	1953	John Dignan	Appointed 24 March and consecrated 1 June 1924; died 12 April 1953
1953	1962	William J. Philbin	Appointed 22 December 1953 and consecrated 14 March 1954; translated to Down and Connor 5 June 1962
1963	1982	Thomas Ryan	Appointed 9 May and consecrated 16 June 1963; resigned 1 May 1982; died 20 August 1983
1982	1987	Joseph Cassidy	Appointed coadjutor bishop 24 August and consecrated 23 September 1979; succeeded 1 May 1982; translated to Tuam 22 August 1987
1988	2019	John Kirby	Appointed 18 February and consecrated 9 April 1988; resigned 16 July 2019
2019	present	Michael Duignan	Appointed 16 July and consecrated 13 October 2019

== Bibliography ==
- Fryde, E. B.; Greenway, D. E.; Porter, S.; Roy, I., eds. (1986). Handbook of British Chronology (3rd, reprinted 2003 ed.). Cambridge: Cambridge University Press. ISBN 0-521-56350-X.
