= Brian Molloy (Irish republican) =

Irish nationalist and revolutionary figure

Brian Molloy, born in 1888, was an Irish nationalist and revolutionary figure who played a significant role in the struggle for Irish independence during the early 20th century. He was an active member of the Irish Republican Brotherhood and later served as an officer in both the Irish Volunteers and the Irish Republican Army, fl. 1916-1921. Molloy held the rank of Battalion Commandant in the No. 1 Galway Brigade of the Irish Volunteers during the Irish War of Independence (1919–1921). This period marks some of the most intense guerrilla activity in the Irish revolutionary period, involving ambushes, intelligence gathering, and the coordination of military actions against British forces.

== Membership in the Castlegar Circle ==
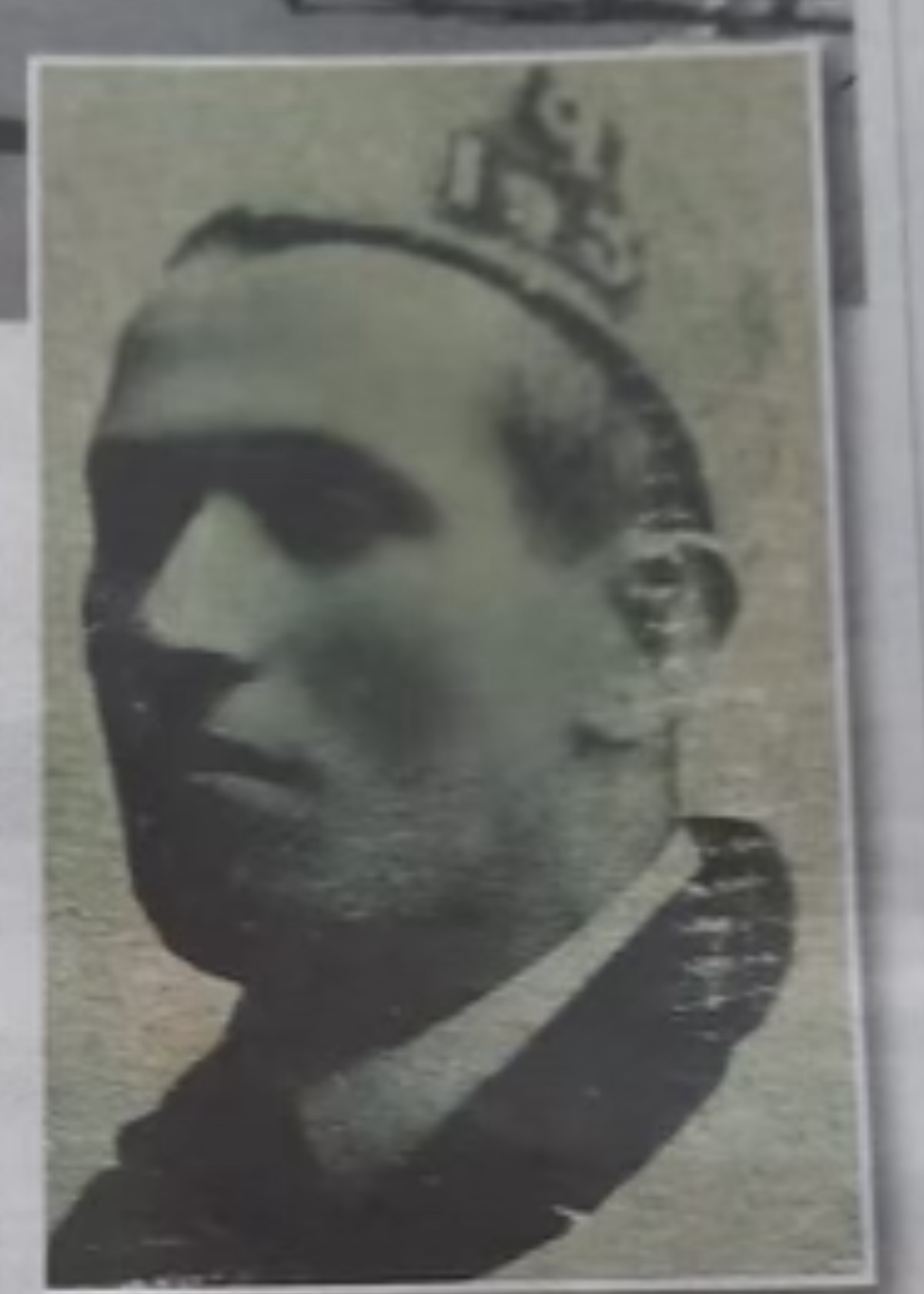
Brian Molloy photographed wearing a prison hat following the Easter Rising.

The Castlegar Circle of the IRB was formed in the early 1900s, with Molloy becoming a sworn member in 1907 at nineteen years old. He joined under the oath administered by Dick Murphy. Initial activities included land agitation, such as cattle drives and wall-breaking, which attracted scrutiny from the Royal Irish Constabulary (R.I.C.).

The Castlegar Company conducted sham battles and maneuvers to simulate engagements with Crown Forces. This training spanned areas from Oranmore to Lough Corrib. As the Rising approached, Molloy and other leaders strategized on potential actions and coordinated with Captain Monahan, who was under constant surveillance by Crown Forces. Plans included defending strategic locations and anticipating the arrival of arms by submarine, although these were hampered by logistical challenges.

In 1913, the Irish Volunteers were established to defend Irish autonomy, and Molloy became an officer of the Galway brigade in 1915. His leadership in this paramilitary organization was significant in organizing local forces and preparing for potential conflict with British authorities.

== Easter 1916 Rising ==
Molloy, along with Michael Newell, was described as "... a born leader ... was the guide and motivator of the Castlegar Company in the 1916 rising and later in the War of Independence." In preparation for the Rising, Molloy followed orders from Liam Mellows and Captain Monahan, discussing the potential actions to be taken. Molloy received orders to mobilize his company and to pledge their commitment to the cause of Irish independence. This directive came through on the Friday before the Easter Sunday mobilisation, a final call to arms for the Irish Volunteers.

Molloy, along with his company, was tasked with monitoring strategic locations and ensuring their readiness in case of action. As detailed by Molloy in his witness statement (released by the Bureau of Military History), his company was kept on high alert, with secretive plans to intercept potential arms shipments and to ensure the success of the Rising in the region.

On orders from Patrick Pearse, Liam Mellows led the Irish Volunteers in a Rising in east Co. Galway, which lasted from Tuesday April 25 to Saturday April 29. Between 5:00 and 5:30 AM on Wednesday, April 26, 1916, the second day of the Easter Rising in County Galway, an exchange of fire took place at Carnmore Crossroads between the Claregalway and Castlegar Volunteers and British forces. The Volunteer Companies were led by Nicholas Kyne and Brian Molloy respectively.

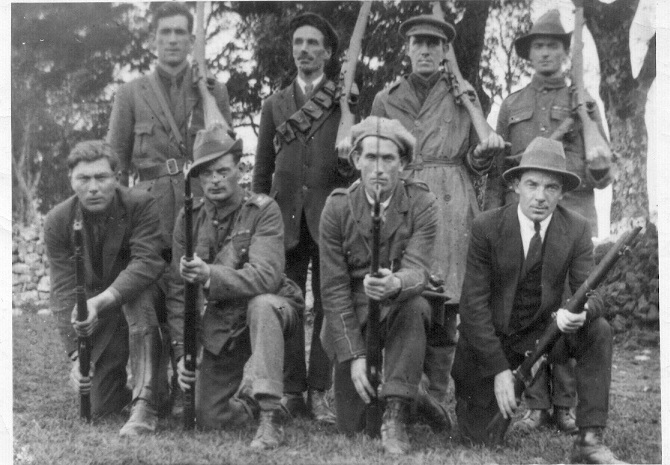
Castlegar and Claregalway Men, 1922. Photo courtesy of CC BY NC-ND. Brian Molloy is in the front row, third from the left.

He was captured in the aftermath of the Easter Rising and sentenced to death. This was subsequently commuted to ten years' penal servitude, but he was released in June 1917.

== Active service in Galway ==
Following the reorganization of nationalist forces, Molloy became an officer in the Irish Republican Army (IRA) in Galway. Between 1919 and 1921, during the Irish War of Independence, Molloy played a critical role in orchestrating guerrilla warfare against British forces. His work involved planning ambushes, gathering intelligence, and maintaining morale among volunteers in Galway. He commanded the Merlin Park Ambush on August 21, 1920.

His family home was looted and burned to the ground by the Black and Tans.

In July 1922, he joined the anti-treaty side during the Civil War and fought against the National Army in Galway city.

Brian Molloy's revolver and holster were donated by the family to the Galway City Museum.

== See also ==
- Liam Mellows
- Galway City Museum
- Tom Ruane
- Joe Howley
- Larry Lardner
