= Pádraig Ó Fathaigh =

Pádraig Ó Fathaigh (1879–1976) was a member of the Gaelic League and an Intelligence Officer of the Irish Republican Army.

== Background and early life ==
A native of Lurgan, Gort, County Galway, Ó Fathaigh was the fifth of six children (and third son) of Laurence and Bridget Ó Fathaigh. Like most of their neighbours, the family were tenant farmers "who lived in a three-roomed house and raised grains, root crops and livestock for sale at local markets. They also maintained a few outbuildings for their animals, indicating that the family was able to invest in some improvements on their farm." Growing up amid the Irish Land War and Home Rule, Ó Fathaigh – whose family spoke Irish at home – joined the Gaelic League. He was certified to teach Irish in national schools in 1907 and two years later became the full-time múinteoir taistil (travelling teacher) for the Gort area. He regularly cycled all over the district each week, his night classes been as large as 150 pupils.

== Irish Volunteer ==
He joined the Irish Volunteers in 1914, possibly becoming a member of the Irish Republican Brotherhood around the same time. His older brothers, Mícheál and Seán were also Volunteers, while their youngest sister, Mary, was secretary of the local Cumann na mBan. Liam Mellows was a regular visitor to the family home. His participation in the Easter Rebellion of 1916 was cut short by his arrest at Kinvara presbytery, while the main group of over six hundred Galway volunteers gathered near Athenry and Oranmore under Liam Mellows and Larry Lardner.

== Active service in County Galway ==
After the failure of the rising, Ó Fathaigh served time for penal servitude in England until released in 1917. With the start of the Irish War of Independence he was on the run, serving as an intelligence officer.

He was arrested in January 1920 and was imprisoned in England. He participated in the ten-day hunger strike at London's Wormwood Scrubs prison in 1920. He escaped on 16 May, arriving back in the Gort area in June. Over the following year his friend, Joe Howley, and informant, Constable Kearney of the Royal Irish Constabulary, were killed by the Black and Tans, while other events included the killings of Eileen Quinn, Fr. Michael Griffin, the Loughnane brothers, Frank Shawe-Taylor and Captain C.E.N. Blake. Following the death of the latter, his wife and two fellow officers at the Ballyturin ambush, Ó Fathaigh's family home was burned by Crown forces, after which they ran riot in Gort.

After the Truce of 1922, he was congratulated for his efforts from Michael Collins. However, he took the Anti-Treaty side in the Irish Civil War.

== Later life ==
After the war, he earned a degree in Celtic Studies from National University of Ireland, Galway, teaching in his locality. In later years he worked as a Health Board clerk for Galway County Council and was secretary of the committee which erected a monument to Liam Mellows in Eyre Square.

== Memoir ==
Pádraig Ó Fathaigh wrote a memoir of his life in 1968, which is now National Library of Ireland MS 21288. It was published in 2000.

== See also ==
- Éamonn Ceannt
- Liam Mellows
- Frank Shawe-Taylor
