= Brian Molloy =

Brian Molloy may refer to:

- Brian Molloy (botanist) (born 1930), New Zealand plant ecologist, conservationist, and former New Zealand All Blacks rugby union player
- Brian Molloy (Irish republican), member of the Irish Republican Army, fl. 1916-1921
- Brian Molloy (hurler) (born 1995), Irish hurler
