= Larry Lardner =

20th-century Irish republican

Larry Lardner, a native of Athenry, County Galway, was a Brigade Commandant for the Irish Republican Army in his locality. He was by trade a publican and a member of the Irish Republican Brotherhood (IRB) Supreme Council for Connacht in 1917. He, along with Liam Mellows and Pádraig Ó Fathaigh, travelled to Limerick where they were informed by Patrick Pearse at an IRB meeting that a rebellion would take place at Easter 1916.

Following Ó Fathaigh's arrest, Lardner and Mellows led some hundreds of local men in occupying Moyode Castle on 26 April. Within days they were informed by a local priest that the rising had failed. He is believed to have accompanied Mellows into hiding in the Slieve Aughty for some months afterwards.

In 1919 he was captured and imprisoned in Wormwood Scrubs, and was one of a group of I.R.A. men who went on hunger strike. Early in January 1920, he was part of a group of local men (including Bill Freaney) who approached Frank Shawe-Taylor on behalf of some local people who were requesting a road to travel to Mass. Shawe-Taylor himself was amenable to their demands but the landlord refused via Shawe-Taylor, who was later killed. Lardner died in Athenry in April 1936.
