= Tom Ruane =

Tom Ruane was captain of the Second Western Division of the Irish Republican Army from 1916 to 1920.

== Background ==
Ruane was a native of Carnmore, County Galway, and joined the Irish Republican Brotherhood in 1908. He was already an active sportsman with the GAA, his position being full-back. From 1910 to 1916 he captained the local hurling team.

== Easter 1916 ==
During the Galway Easter Rising in 1916 he was captain of the Claregalway men. They rendezvoused with the Castlegar man under Brian Molloy and Pat Callanan at Carnmore. Orders were received from Liam Mellows to proceed to the deserted Moyode Castle, in Oranmore. The volunteers were discovered while resting at Carnmore Cross by a group of Royal Irish Constabulary. Fighting broke out but the only casualty was a Constable Whelan, who was the first to die during the Rising.

Arriving at Moyode they congregated with other companies but lack of orders and supplies led to fatigue and hunger. When news of the failure of the Rising in Dublin arrived, the men dispersed, some going home. Ruane himself went on the run.

He hid out in Moycullen and used an island in Lough Corrib as a fall-back during searches. However, a letter was found in his wife's handbag which gave his address as at Bohans, Borra, Moycullen. He was arrested and sent to Frongoch internment camp, where he spent ten months. After his release, he was arrested in 1918 in connection with the German Plot, this time in Wormwood Scrubs and Winson Green.

== Military and civil activities ==
After his release from Birmingham Prison he was appointed a justice of the Sinn Féin courts for south and west Galway. His activities came at the price of a thousand-pound reward for his capture, and he was targeted by the Black and Tans. He may have participated on the attack on Loughgeorge R.I.C. Barracks in May 1920, launched by the mid-Galway Brigade.

After the Treaty, he fought on the side of the Republicans. As a reprisal for the Kilroe ambush, near Headford, all his farm produce was burned. In 1925 Ruane was arrested and charged with weapons possession at Boyle, County Roscommon. The charges were later dismissed.

== Later career ==
Ruane was a member of the County Board and a chairman of the Galway District Council for seven years. He served as a Sinn Féin member of the County Council and chairman of the Finance Committee. His son, Paddy Ruane, was elected to the council six times for Sinn Féin while his other son, Stephen, was a member of Fianna Fáil. One of Ruane's grandson's was a British M.P. as of 2000.

Ruane died on 31 August 1937, aged 53, and was buried in Claregalway cemetery.
