= Austin Clarke (poet) =

Irish poet (1896–1974)

- Aibhistín ÓʹCleirigh
- Born: May 9, 1896; Stoneybatter, Dublin, Ireland
- Died: March 19, 1974 (aged 77); Templeogue, Dublin, Ireland
- Occupations: poet, novelist, playwright

Austin Clarke (Irish: Aibhistín Ó Cléirigh) (9 May 1896 – 19 March 1974), born in 83 Manor Street, Stoneybatter, Dublin, was one of the leading Irish poets of the generation after W. B. Yeats. He also wrote plays, novels and memoirs. Clarke's main contribution to Irish poetry was the rigour with which he used technical means borrowed from classical Irish language poetry when writing in English. Irish history and legend are the subjects of many of Clarke's works.

Effectively, this meant writing English verse based not so much on metre as on complex patterns of assonance, consonance, and half rhyme. Describing his technique to Robert Frost, Clarke said "I load myself down with chains and try to wriggle free."

== Early career ==
Clarke's early poetry clearly shows the influence of Yeats. His first book, The Vengeance of Fionn (1917), was a long narrative poem retelling an Ossianic legend. It met with critical acclaim and, unusually for a first book of poetry, went to a second edition. Between this and the 1938 volume Night and Morning, Clarke published a number of collections, all of which, to one extent or another, can be seen as being written in the shadow of Yeats. There was, however, one significant difference; unlike the older poet, Clarke was a Catholic, and themes of guilt and repentance run through this early work.

== Lyric Theatre years ==
Between 1938 and 1955, Clarke published no new lyric or narrative poetry. He co-founded the Lyric Theatre Company in Dublin with Robert Farren, and wrote a number of verse plays for them. The theatre company grew out of Clarke's Dublin Verse Speaking Society, the purpose of which was "to save from neglect the tradition of verse drama left to us by Yeats". The society operated in the Peacock Theatre until 1944, when it moved to the Abbey Theatre and became the Lyric Theatre Company. It continued until 1951, when the Abbey Theatre burned down.

He also worked as a journalist and had a weekly poetry programme on RTÉ radio. It seems likely that he also experienced some kind of personal crisis during this time and this had significant consequences for his later poetry.

== Return to poetry ==
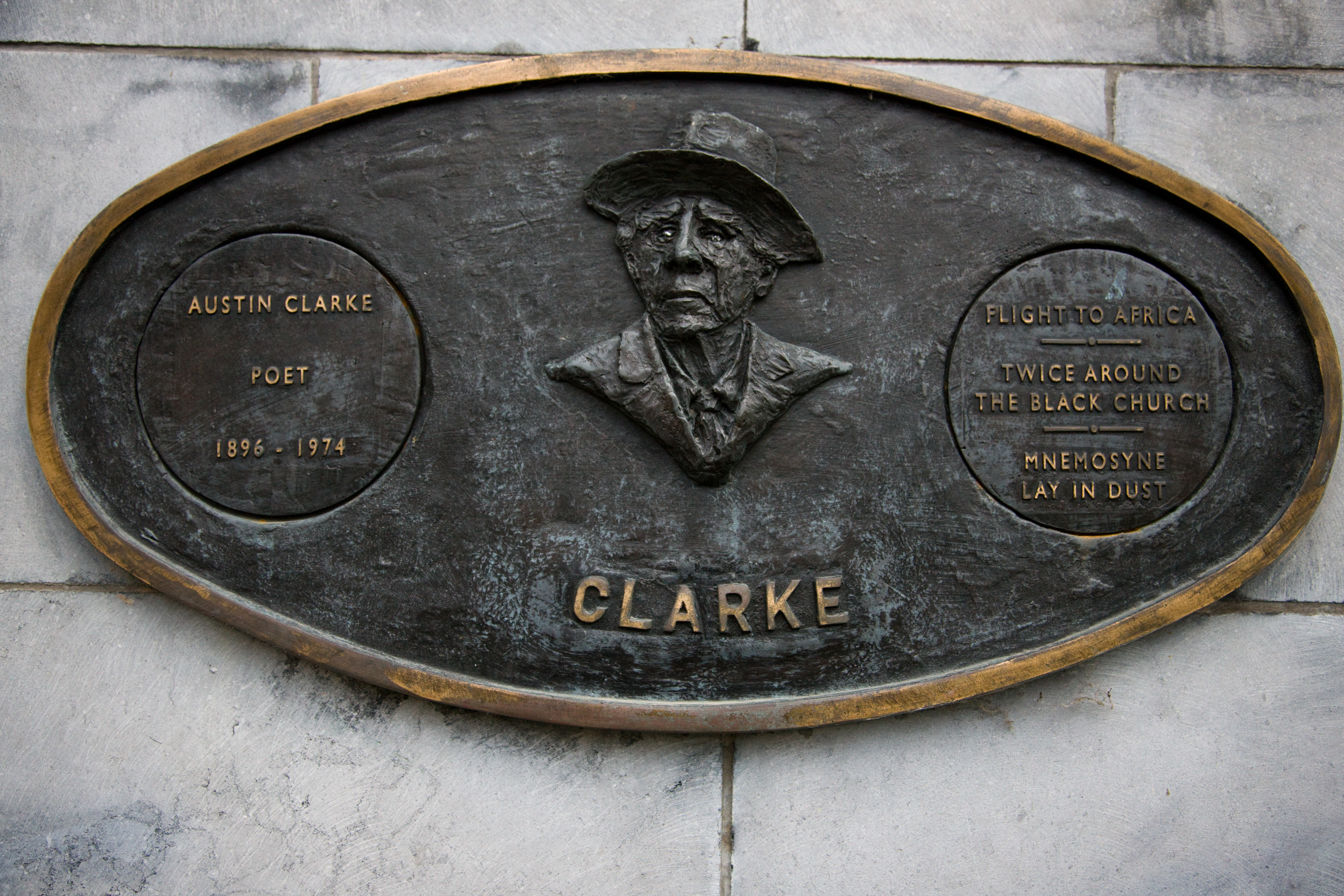
Plaque commemorating Austin Clarke located beside St. Patrick's Cathedral in Dublin.

Clarke returned to publishing poetry with the 1955 collection Ancient Lights, and was to continue writing and publishing prolifically for the remainder of his life. Although he continued to use the same Gaelic-derived techniques, this late poetry is markedly different from the earlier work. Many of the later poems are satires of the Irish church and state, while others are sensual celebrations of human sexuality, free of the guilt of the earlier poems. He also published the intensely personal Mnemosyne Lay in Dust, which is a poem sequence detailing the fictional Maurice Devanes's nervous breakdown and subsequent recovery.

Clarke also came to admire the work of more avant-garde poets like Ezra Pound and Pablo Neruda, both of whom he wrote poems about. A number of the late long poems, such as, for instance, the 1971 Tiresias, show the effects of studying these poets and their looser formal structures. Clarke set up the Bridge Press to publish his own work, which allowed him the freedom to publish work that many mainstream Irish publishers of the time might have been reluctant to handle. His Collected Poems was published in 1974 and his Selected Poems in 1976.

== Other writings ==
In addition to some twenty volumes of poetry and numerous plays, Clarke published three novels: The Bright Temptation (1932), The Singing Men at Cashel (1936), and The Sun Dances at Easter (1952). All of these were banned by the Censorship of Publications Board (Ireland). He also published two volumes of memoirs, Twice Round the Black Church (1962) and A Penny in the Clouds (1968), and a number of scattered critical essays and book reviews. While all of these prose writings are of interest, Clarke's reputation rests firmly on his poetry.

== Family ==
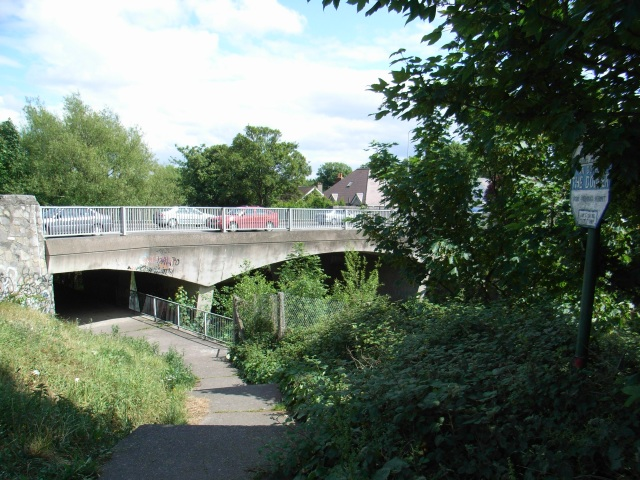
Austin Clarke Bridge in Templeogue.

In 1920 Clarke married Cornelia (Lia) Cummins. The marriage effectively lasted only a few days, and Clarke spent several months in St Patrick's Hospital recovering from it, but they did not divorce before Cummins died in 1943. Clarke met, had three sons with, and later married (1945) Norah Esmerelda Patricia Walker (1900–1985), granddaughter of Matt Harris, MP for East Galway from 1885 to 1890.

Clarke lived in Bridge House beside Templeogue Bridge which spanned the River Dodder in the south Dublin suburb of Templeogue. After his death, there was a proposal to preserve the house and his library of 6,500 books as a memorial. This was not possible owing to long-term plans to demolish the house and widen the road. The old Templeogue Bridge, built in 1800, and Bridge House were removed. A new bridge, opened by Councillor Mrs. Bernie Malone, Chairman Dublin City Council on 11 December 1984, was named Austin Clarke Bridge in his honour.

== Publications ==
=== Poetry collections ===
- The Vengeance of Fionn (1917)
- The Fires of Baal (1921)
- The Sword of the West (1921)
- The Cattledrive of Connaught (1925)
- Pilgrimage (1929)
- Night and Morning (1938)
- Ancient Lights (1955)
- Later Poems (1961)
- Mnemosyne Lay in Dust (1966)
- A Sermon on Swift (1968)
- Orphide (1970)
- Tiresias (1971)
- Collected Poems (1974)
- Selected Poems (1976)

=== Novels ===
- The Bright Temptation (1932)
- The Singing Men at Cashel (1936)
- The Sun Dances at Easter (1952)

=== Memoirs ===
- Twice Round the Black Church (1962)
- A Penny in the Clouds (1968)

=== Plays ===
- The Hunger Demon (1930)
- Sister Eucharia (1939)
- Black Fast (1941)
- The Flame (1941)
- The Kiss (1942)
- The Plot is Ready (1943)
- As the Crow Flies (1943)
- The Viscount of Blarney (1944)
- The Second Kiss (1946)
- The Plot Succeeds (1950)
- The Moment Next to Nothing (1958)
- The Son of Learning (1964)
- The Third Kiss (1967)
- The Impuritans (1972)

=== Essays ===
- Poetry in Modern Ireland (1951)
- First Flight to Africa (1964)

== Bibliography ==
- Harmon, Maurice. Austin Clarke, 1896–1974: A Critical Introduction. Wolfhound Press, 1989. ISBN 0-389-20864-7.
- Schirmer, Gregory A. The Poetry of Austin Clarke. University of Notre Dame Press, 1983. ISBN 978-0268015497.
- Tapping, G. Craig. Austin Clarke: A Study of His Writings. Barnes & Noble, 1981. ISBN 978-0389200413.
- Fryatt, Kit. ‘’Austin Clarke.’’ Aberdeen University Press, 2020. ISBN 978-1-85752-086-6.
