= Howley =

Howley or Howly may refer to:

== People ==
- Chuck Howley (born 1936), former American football player
- Dan Howley (1885-1944), American baseball player nicknamed "Dapper Dan"
- Frank L. Howley (1903–1993), American general and former commandant, U.S. sector of Berlin
- James Patrick Howley (1847–1918), Canadian naturalist
- Joe Howley (fl. 1916–1920), Sinn Féin captain
- Kerry Howley (born 1981), American magazine editor
- Kevin Howley (1924–1997), English football referee
- Michael Francis Howley (184–-1914), Roman Catholic priest and Archbishop of St. John's, Newfoundland
- Orlando Martínez Howley (1944–1975), Dominican Republic journalist
- Paul Howley (born 1955), founder and owner of That's Entertainment comics and collectible
- Richard Howly (1740–1784), American planter and lawyer
- Rob Howley (born 1970), Welsh rugby player
- William Howley (1766–1848), Archbishop of Canterbury

== Places ==
- Howley, Gloucestershire, England, UK
- Howley, Newfoundland and Labrador, Canada
- Howley, Somerset, a location in England, UK
- Howley, Warrington, near Latchford, England, UK
- Howly, Barpeta district, Assam, India

== Other ==
- Howley Hall, Batley, West Yorkshire, England
