= East Galway =

East Galway can mean:

- A Dáil Éireann constituency, see Galway East
- The eastern area of County Galway
- A former UK Parliament constituency 1885–1922, see East Galway (UK Parliament constituency)
