= John Roche (politician) =

Irish politician

John Roche (1848 – 27 August 1914) was an Irish politician.

Born in Woodford, County Galway, he was the son of William Roche, a miller and farmer.

He was a tenant on the Woodford estate of the Earl of Clanricarde, and was jailed on a number of occasions for his active opposition to eviction proceedings during the Land War.

He married, on 30 January 1878, Teresa Donnelly, of Douras, Co. Galway.

He was MP for Galway East from 14 May 1890 to his death in 1914.

He was a member of the Anti-Parnellite Irish National Federation during the split in the Irish Parliamentary Party.

Parliament of the United Kingdom
Preceded by Matthew Harris	Member of Parliament for East Galway; 1890–1914	Succeeded by James Cosgrave
