= Spanish Arch =

Historic site in Ireland

- An Póirse (Irish)
- Eyre Arch
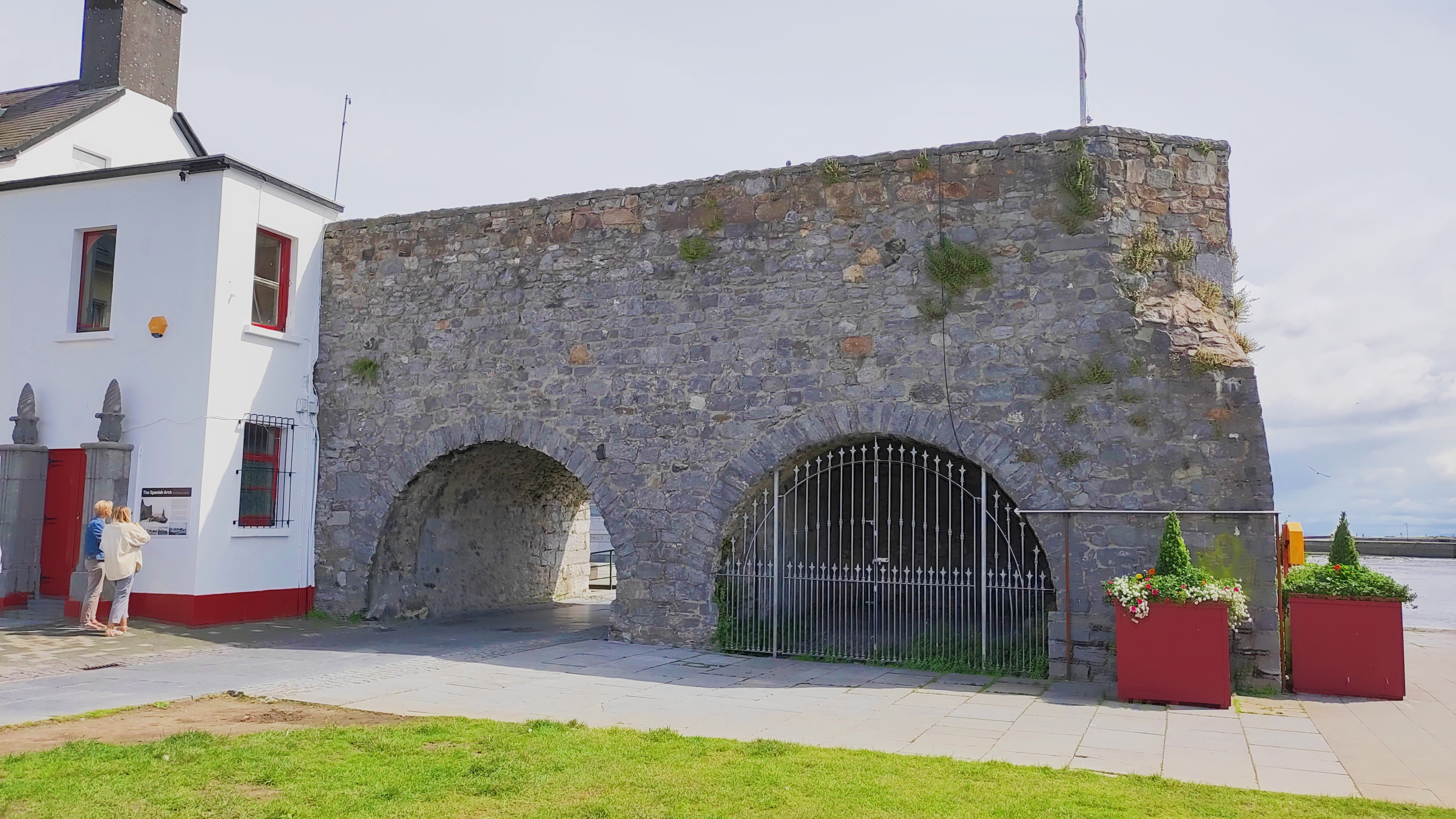
- The Spanish Arch and the Caoċ Arch as they stand today, on the east bank of the Corrib

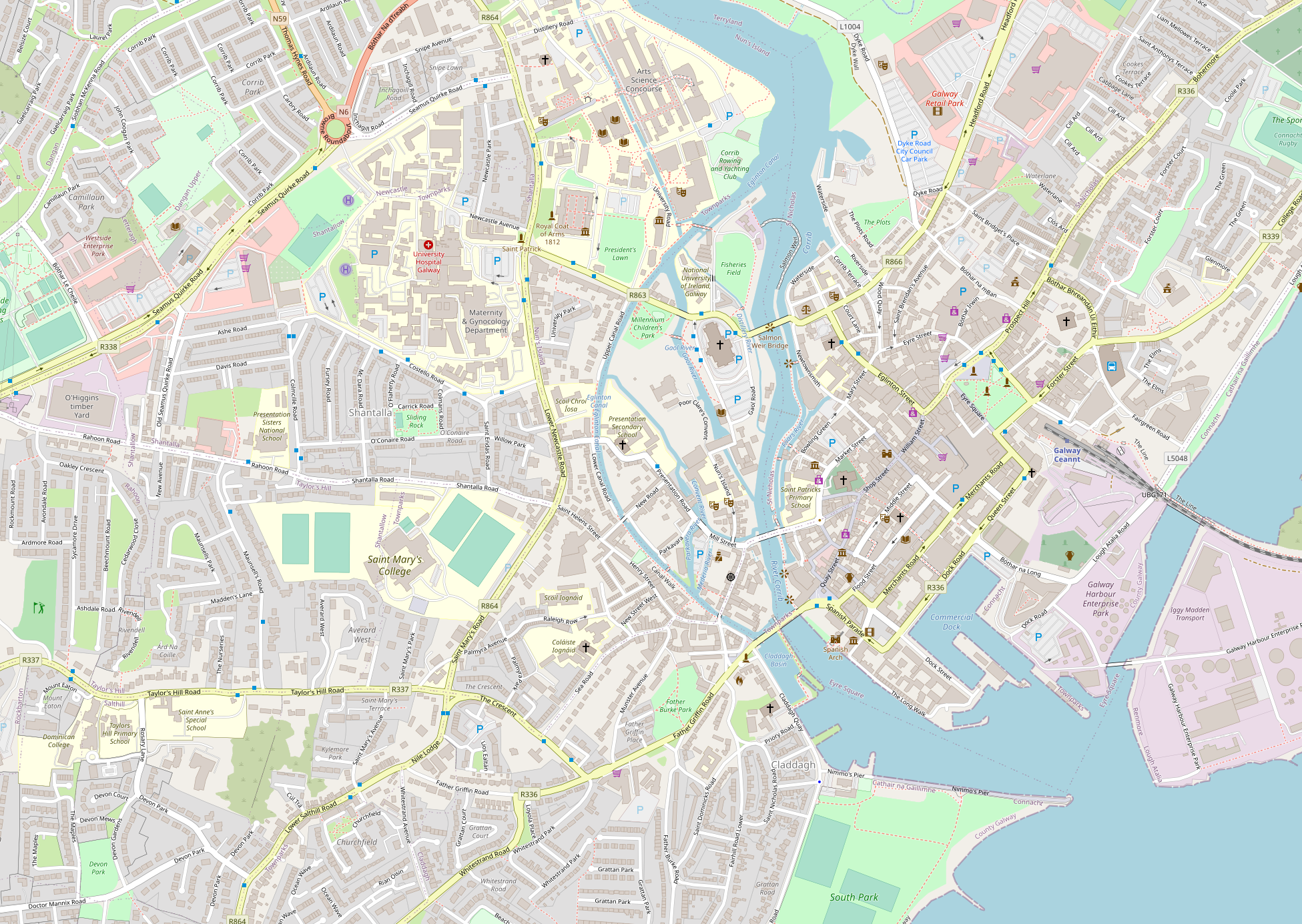
- Location within Galway
- 53°16′11″N 9°03′15″W
- Type: archway, part of a former city wall
- Location: Galway, Ireland

History
- Built: early 18th century

The Spanish Arch (Irish: An Póirse) and the Caoċ Arch (Irish: An Póirse Caoċ, "blind arch") in Galway city, Ireland, are two remaining arches on the Ceann an Bhalla ("Front Wall").

== History ==
The two arches were part of the extension of the city wall from Martin's Tower to the bank of the River Corrib, as a measure to protect the city's quays, which were in the area once known as the Fish Market (now Spanish Parade). It was constructed during the mayoralty of Wylliam Martin in 1584, being called ceann an bhalla (the head of the wall).

In the 18th century the Eyre family of Eyrecourt, County Galway, created an extension of the quays called The Long Walk and created the arches to allow access from the town to the new quays. The designation "Spanish" is not historical to this period and was likely known as the Eyre Arch when built.

In 1755, the arches were partially destroyed by the tsunami generated by the 1755 Lisbon earthquake.

Until 2006, part of the Arch housed the Galway City Museum. At that time, the museum was moved to a new, dedicated building located just behind the Arch.

The Long Walk is a promenade to one side of the Arches.

== Cultural depictions ==
As a historical landmark, the Spanish Arch appears in several media works set in Galway, including the 1957 film The Rising of the Moon.

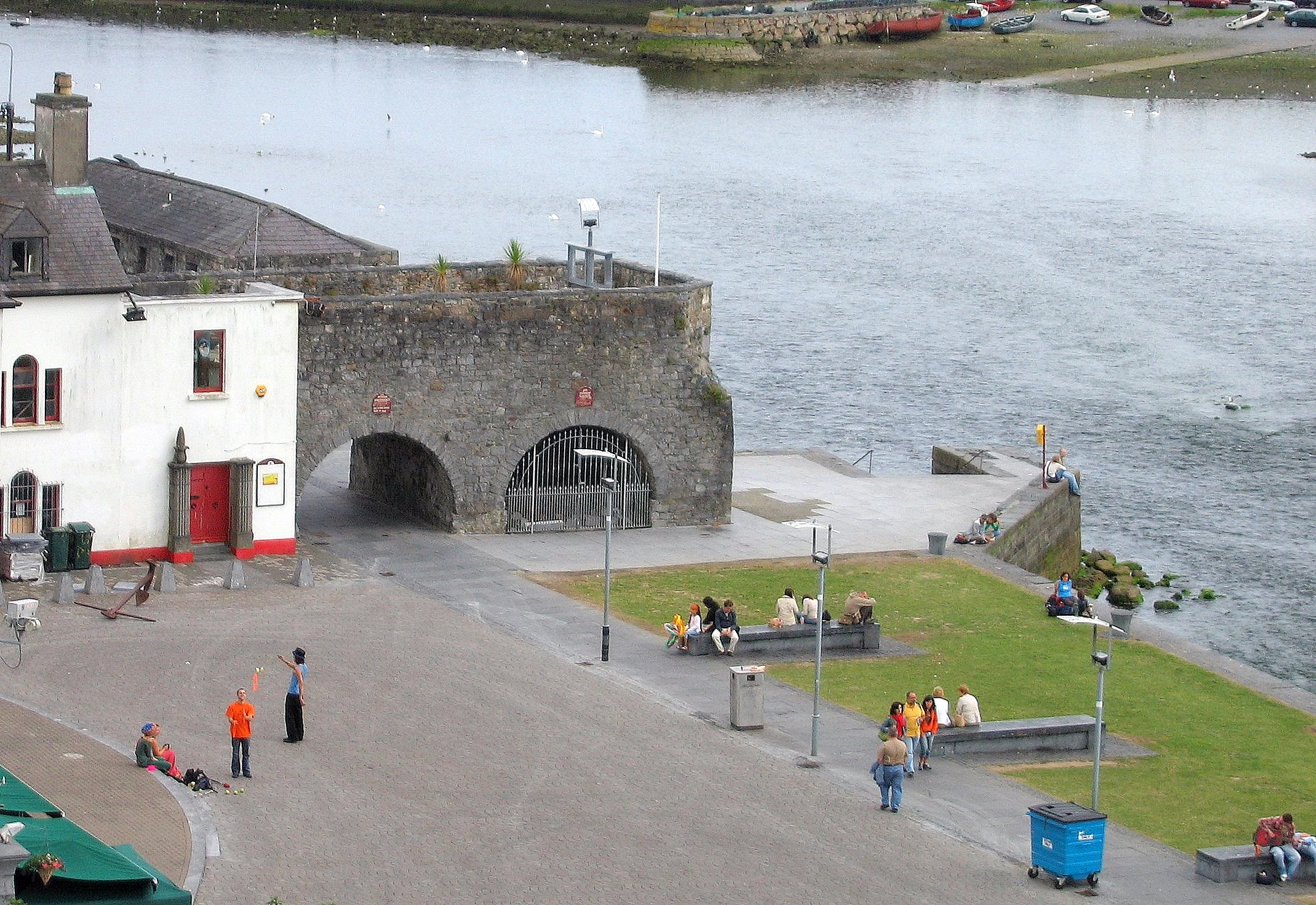
The area in front of the Arch

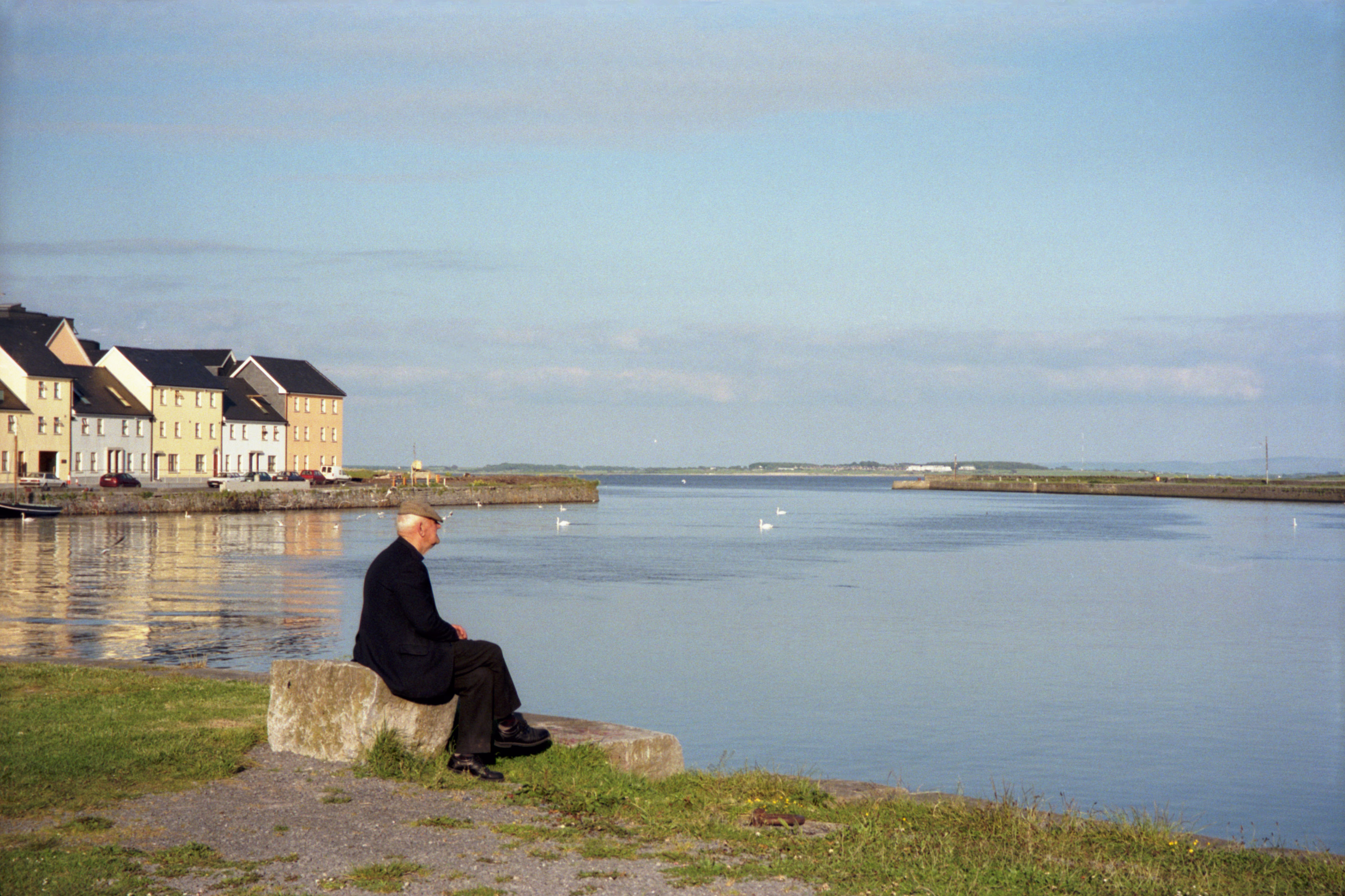
Ballyknow Quay, Claddagh, Galway, with The Long Walk in the background
