= Ulick O'Connor =

Irish writer and historian (1928–2019)

- Born: 12 October 1928; Rathgar, County Dublin, Ireland
- Died: 7 October 2019 (aged 90); Ireland
- Occupations: Biographer, Poet
- Writing career
- Period: 1954–2019
- Genres: Irish History, Poetry, Drama, Biography, Diary, literary criticism
- Notable work: See 'Published works'

Ulick O'Connor (English: /ˈjuːlɪk/ YOO-lik; 12 October 1928 – 7 October 2019) was an Irish writer, historian and critic.

== Early life ==
Born in Rathgar, County Dublin, in 1928 to Matthew O'Connor, the Dean of the Royal College of Surgeons, O'Connor attended Garbally College, Ballinasloe, St. Mary's College, Rathmines and later University College Dublin, where he studied law and philosophy, becoming known as a keen sporting participant, especially in boxing, rugby and cricket, as well as a distinguished debater – during his time there he was an active member of the Literary and Historical Society. He subsequently studied at Loyola University, New Orleans. He was called to the bar in 1951.

== Career and writings ==
After practising at the Irish Bar in Dublin, O'Connor spent time as a critic before turning to writing. His work spanned areas such as biography, poetry, Irish history, drama, diary, and literary criticism. He was a sports correspondent for The Observer from 1955 to 1961.

He was a well-known intellectual figure in contemporary Irish affairs and expressed strong opinions against censorship and the war on drugs. He contributed a regular poetry column to the Irish daily the Evening Herald, also wrote a column for the Sunday Mirror and a sporting column for the Sunday Times, as well as broadcasting on RTÉ.

His best-known writing was his biographies of Oliver St. John Gogarty, Brendan Behan, his studies of the early 20th-century Irish troubles and the Irish Literary Revival.

He was also known for the autobiographical The Ulick O’Connor Diaries 1970-1981: A Cavalier Irishman (2001), which details his encounters with well-known Irish and international figures, ranging from political (Jack Lynch and Paddy Devlin) to the artistic (Christy Brown and Peter Sellers). It also documents the progress of the Peace Process during the same time, and the progress of the Northern Ireland Assembly. Although he travelled extensively, O'Connor lived in his parental home in Dublin's Rathgar. He was a member of Aosdána.

O'Connor's great-grandfather was Matt Harris, Land Leaguer, Fenian, and Irish Parliamentary Party Member of Parliament. He was related to American actor Carroll O'Connor. He died on 7 October 2019, five days short of his 91st birthday.

== Published works ==
=== Plays ===
- The Dream Box (1972)
- The Dark Lovers (1975)
- The Emperor’s Envoy (1976)
- The Grand Inquisitor; Submarine; and Deirdre (Dublin 1977, New York 1980)
- Execution (1985)
- The Oval Machine (1986)
- A Trinity of Two (1988)
- Joyicity (1989)
- Deux de la Trinite (translated by Ramond Gerome, 1990).

=== Poetry collections ===
- Lifestyles (1973)
- Three Noh Plays (1980)
- All Things Counter (1986)
- One is Animate (1990)
- Poems of the Damned (translations from Baudelaire's Fleur du Mal, 1991).

=== Non-fiction and autobiography ===
- Irish Tales and Sagas (1981)
- A Critic at Large (1984)
- Biographers and the Art of Biography (1990)
- The Ulick O'Connor Diaries, 1970-1981: A Cavalier Irishman (2003)

=== Biographical writings ===
- The Times I've Seen: Oliver St. John Gogarty: A Biography (1963)
- Brendan Behan (1970)
- Executions (1983)
- Celtic Dawn: A Portrait of the Irish Literary Renaissance (1984)
  - US edition: All the Olympians: A Biographical Portrait of the Irish Literary Renaissance (1984)
- The Troubles: Michael Collins and the Volunteers in the Fight for Irish Freedom 1912-22 (2001)
