= 1914 East Galway by-election =

UK Parliamentary by-election

The 1914 East Galway by-election was held on 4 December 1914. The by-election was held due to the death of the incumbent Irish Parliamentary MP, John Roche. It was won by the Irish Parliamentary candidate James Cosgrave who was unopposed due to a War-time electoral pact.
