= James Cosgrave =

Irish politician (1865–1936)

Teachta Dála
- In office August 1923 – June 1927
- Constituency: Galway

Member of Parliament
- In office December 1914 – December 1918
- Constituency: East Galway

Personal details
- Born: 12 September 1865 Eyrecourt, County Galway, Ireland
- Died: 18 April 1936 (aged 70) Dublin, Ireland
- Party: Irish Parliamentary Party; Independent
- Other political affiliations: National League Party; Fianna Fáil

James Cosgrave (12 September 1865 – 18 April 1936; surname also spelt as Cosgrove) was an Irish nationalist politician, and also one of the few parliamentarians who served in the House of Commons of the United Kingdom and in Dáil Éireann.

Born in Skehanagh, Eyrecourt, County Galway, he was the son of Michael Cosgrave and Margaret Kirwan.

He was returned unopposed as member of parliament for East Galway in the 4 December 1914 by-election for the Irish Parliamentary Party on the death of John Roche. He did not contest the 1918 general election, and the seat was won by Liam Mellows of Sinn Féin.

He successfully ran as an Independent Nationalist at the 1923 general election and was elected for the Galway constituency. At the 1927 June and September 1927 elections, he unsuccessfully ran as a National League Party candidate.

In later years, he was associated with Fianna Fáil. He was later a member of Galway County Council and chairman of Ballinasloe Mental Hospital Committee.

Cosgrave remarried in 1923 and moved to Dublin, where he died at his residence at Baggot House, 91 Lower Baggot St. He is buried in Quansboro, Killimor, County Galway.

== Sources ==
- "Mr. James Cosgrove, Skehanagh, Eyrecourt", Connacht Tribune, 25 April 1936.

Parliament of the United Kingdom
Preceded by John Roche	Member of Parliament for East Galway; 1914–1918	Succeeded by Liam Mellows

Dáil	Election	Deputy (Party)	Deputy (Party)	Deputy (Party)	Deputy (Party)	Deputy (Party)	Deputy (Party)	Deputy (Party)	Deputy (Party)	Deputy (Party)
2nd	1921	Liam Mellows (SF)	Bryan Cusack (SF)	Frank Fahy (SF)	Joseph Whelehan (SF)	Pádraic Ó Máille (SF)	George Nicolls (SF)	Patrick Hogan (SF)	7 seats 1921–1923	
3rd	1922	Thomas O'Connell (Lab)	Bryan Cusack (AT-SF)	Frank Fahy (AT-SF)	Joseph Whelehan (PT-SF)	Pádraic Ó Máille (PT-SF)	George Nicolls (PT-SF)	Patrick Hogan (PT-SF)	7 seats 1921–1923	
4th	1923	Thomas O'Connell (Lab)	Barney Mellows (Rep)	Frank Fahy (Rep)	Louis O'Dea (Rep)	Pádraic Ó Máille (CnaG)	George Nicolls (CnaG)	Patrick Hogan (CnaG)	Seán Broderick (CnaG)	James Cosgrave (Ind.)
5th	1927 (Jun)	Gilbert Lynch (Lab)	Thomas Powell (FF)	Frank Fahy (Note: Frank Fahy served as Ceann Comhairle from 9 March 1932.) (FF)	Seán Tubridy (FF)	Mark Killilea Snr (FF)	Martin McDonogh (CnaG)	Patrick Hogan (CnaG)	Seán Broderick (CnaG)	William Duffy (NL)
6th	1927 (Sep)	Stephen Jordan (FF)	Thomas Powell (FF)	Frank Fahy (FF)	Seán Tubridy (FF)	Mark Killilea Snr (FF)	Martin McDonogh (CnaG)	Patrick Hogan (CnaG)	Seán Broderick (CnaG)	Joseph Mongan (CnaG)
7th	1932	Stephen Jordan (FF)	Thomas Powell (FF)	Frank Fahy (FF)	Patrick Beegan (FF)	Gerald Bartley (FF)	Fred McDonogh (CnaG)	Patrick Hogan (CnaG)	Seán Broderick (CnaG)	Joseph Mongan (CnaG)
8th	1933	Stephen Jordan (FF)	Mark Killilea Snr (FF)	Frank Fahy (FF)	Patrick Beegan (FF)	Gerald Bartley (FF)	Séamus Keely (FF)	Patrick Hogan (CnaG)	Seán Broderick (CnaG)	Martin McDonogh (CnaG)
8th	1935 by-election	Stephen Jordan (FF)	Mark Killilea Snr (FF)	Frank Fahy (FF)	Patrick Beegan (FF)	Gerald Bartley (FF)	Séamus Keely (FF)	Patrick Hogan (CnaG)	Seán Broderick (CnaG)	Eamon Corbett (FF)
8th	1936 by-election	Stephen Jordan (FF)	Mark Killilea Snr (FF)	Frank Fahy (FF)	Patrick Beegan (FF)	Gerald Bartley (FF)	Séamus Keely (FF)	Martin Neilan (FF)	Seán Broderick (CnaG)	Eamon Corbett (FF)
9th	1937	Constituency abolished. See Galway East and Galway West								
