= 1890 East Galway by-election =

UK Parliamentary by-election

The 1890 East Galway by-election was a parliamentary by-election held for the United Kingdom House of Commons constituency of East Galway on 14 May 1890. The vacancy arose because of the death of the sitting member, Matthew Harris of the Irish Parliamentary Party. Only one candidate was nominated, John Roche of the Irish Parliamentary Party, who was elected unopposed.
