= Matthew Harris (Irish politician) =

Irish politician

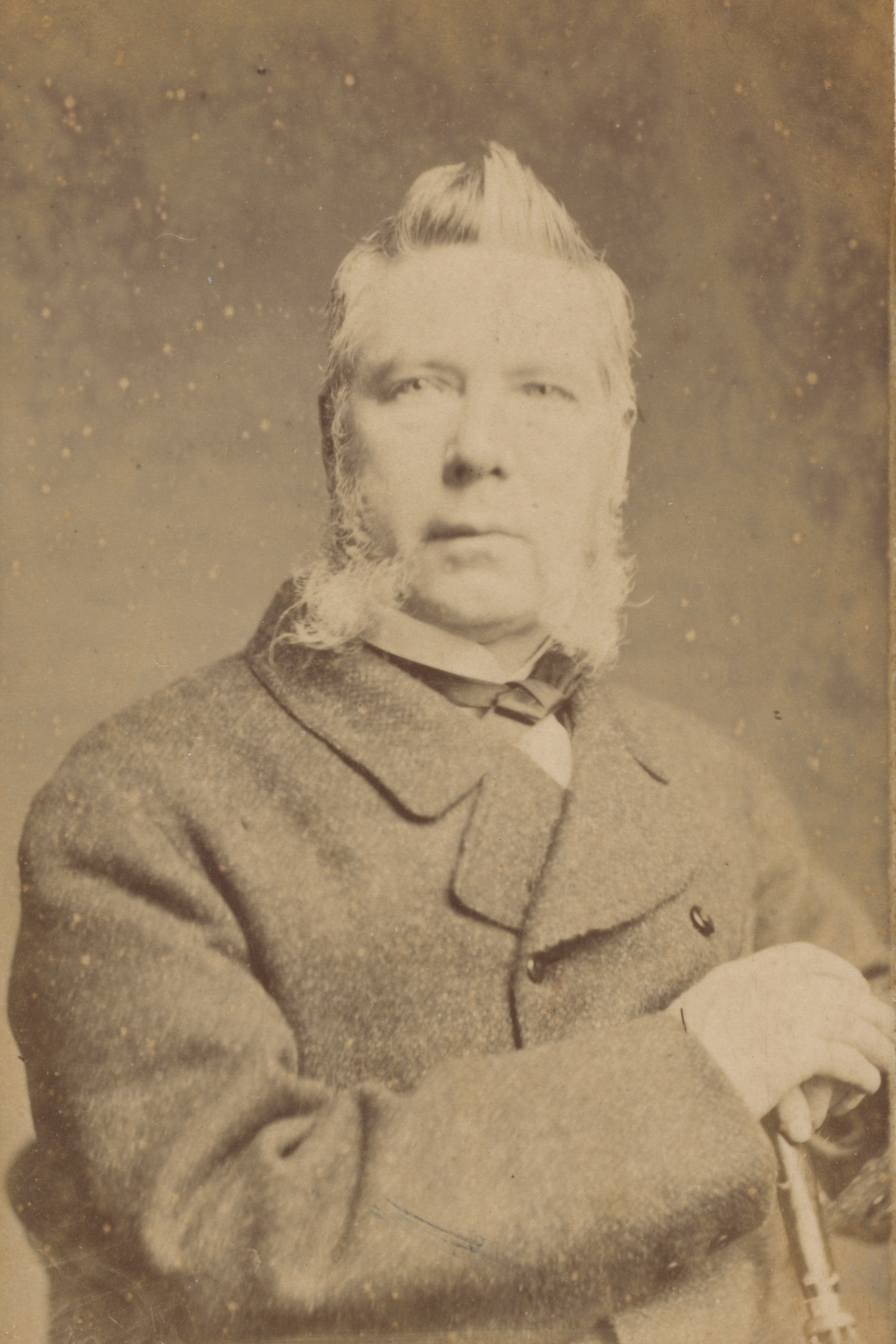
- Harris, c. 1880s

Member of Parliament for Galway East
- In office 27 November 1885 – 13 April 1890
- Preceded by: New constituency
- Succeeded by: John Roche

Personal details
- Born: 11 July 1826 Athlone
- Died: 13 March 1890 (aged 63)
- Resting place: Creagh cemetery, Ballinasloe, County Galway
- Party: Irish Parliamentary Party

Matthew Harris (baptised 11 July 1826 – 13 April 1890), best known as Mat (or Matt) Harris, was an Irish Fenian, Land Leaguer, nationalist politician and member of parliament (MP) in the House of Commons of the United Kingdom of Great Britain and Ireland, for the Irish Parliamentary Party. He represented Galway East from 1885 until his death in 1890.

== Life ==
Harris is believed to have been born in Athlone to Peter and Ann Harris, but spent most of his adult life in Ballinasloe, where he worked as a building contractor. His grandfather, Peter Harris, was executed in Monasterevin by the British forces during the Irish Rebellion of 1798.

He was involved in all the major 19th-century political movements of Irish nationalism, and was in the turn a Repealer, a Young Irelander, before moving to join the Fenians, where he became the main Fenian representative in East Galway and South Roscommon.

From 1865 to 1880, he was an active Fenian and the representative of the West of Ireland on the Supreme Council of the Irish Republican Brotherhood. As the Irish Parliamentary Party under Charles Stewart Parnell began to become more militant, and together with the Land League formed another route for the struggle for independence, Harris, together with Michael Davitt, left the IRB Supreme Council, and focussed his energy on the land struggle. In 1879, he was a member of the founding committee of the National Land League under Parnell's presidency. In 1880, he worked on the T. P. O'Connor's election campaign in the Galway Borough election.

In the 1885 general election, he was elected MP for Galway East. He made his election victory speech in Athenry and said that upon entering the House of Commons, he would:

'go into the house the citadel of the enemy,...I go there not for the purpose of assisting that house or the members of that House, in any effort they make to oppress Ireland. If I go in there it will be alone in the interests of my country, and I shall face them in the interests of our common humanity against that monstrous government ... that government of inequity that has done more evil than any government has ever done since the creation of the world'.

Harris pledged 'not to deviate a hairs breath away from principle', i.e. achieving peasant proprietorship for tenants and the total abolition of landlords and promised to quit the Parliamentary Party if he believed that they were not progressing in the direction that had to be followed. He reminded the people that they needed to work together for the independence of Ireland, and asked them to:

'keep a strong and determined animus against England in your hearts and do not mind the English for they are your enemies. They have destroyed and every day endeavour to destroy you....keep a firm front against these men...the organisation may be objectionable in one sense, but as long as it is against England it has good in it'.

Along with other Land League leaders, he was indicted in 1887 under the Coercion Act for conspiracy in relation to his involvement in the Plan of Campaign. During the Parnell Commission of 1888, Sir Henry James cross-examined Harris, as treasurer of the Land League, as to whether anything had been paid to the Clan na Gael. The other treasurer, the late John Dillon, had left for Australia. Harris declared that the figure Sir Henry James mentioned did not appear in the books of the League.

He was married to Mary Martha Bennett of Ahascragh. His granddaughter Norah Walker (1900–1985) was the wife of Irish poet Austin Clarke. Harris's great-grandson is the Irish playwright Ulick O'Connor. Politicians Patrick Dooley and Thomas Harris were also related to Matt Harris.

== Harris in the words of others ==
William O'Brien recalls an incident in 1881, when the leaders of the Land League decided to meet in Paris to avoid arrest in the United Kingdom:

While we were waiting for Parnell, Mat Harris afforded comic relief. On the Sunday before his arrival Mat and I walked the Boulevards in a foggy frost, cursing his neglect. Suddenly Matt asked could I get him a glass of whiskey. I steered for the Café de la Paix as a likely venue, but no whiskey was then stocked there. I told this to Mat, and proposed brandy. He grumbled, but ordered a "fine champagne". The waiter poured out a tot into a tiny liqueur glass, to Mat's wonderment. "What's that?" he asked. "Fine champagne, monsieur." Mat, glass in hand, surveyed him. Disdaining its insignificance, he threw off its contents, but muttered to the Frenchman, "No wonder the Prussians licked ye!"

Timothy Michael Healy described how Harris was an inspiration for younger Irish nationalists:

Mat was a power in Connaught, and possessed a flow of humour. We youngsters sat at his feet as a veteran to hear him discourse of old times. He once proclaimed, as we pastured on soda and milk, while he drank punch in the Imperial Hotel, Dublin: "I'd rather be at my own humble fireside in Ballinasloe after my third tumbler of punch, than drinking soda and milk in the best hotel in Europe!"

== Death ==
Matthew Harris died from stomach cancer on 13 April 1890, aged 63, and is buried at Creagh cemetery, Ballinasloe. A monument to Harris was unveiled by John Dillon in 1907.

The inscription on the Matthew Harris monument reads:

This monument was erected in memory of
Matthew Harris ESQ M.P.
By his fellow countrymen as a tribute to his lofty
Patriotism his spotless integrity his unselfish devotion
Of great powers to great public ends his lifelong services to
The cause of Irish Nationality his sympathy with the
Oppressed of every race and creed like the great apostle
Preaching Christ he knew only humanity and humanity crucified
BORN 1826 ELECTED MP FOR EAST GALWAY 1885 DIED APRIL 13th 1890

== Writings ==
- Harris, Matthew, The improvement of rivers and reclamation of waste lands ... considered in relation to the Shannon, its tributaries, and the districts through which they flow. A letter addressed to ... B. Disraeli, M.P., Dublin: McGlashan & Gill, 1876.
- Harris, M.. Matthew Harris on the political situation, [n.p., 1880]
- Harris, M., Land reform: a letter to the council of the Irish National Land League, Dublin: Gill, 1881.

== Sources ==
- Dictionary of Irish History: From 1800, D.J. Hickey & J.E. Doherty, Gill & MacMillan, Dublin/Norway, 2003; ISBN 0-7171-2520-3
- Fenian Memories, Dr. Mark F. Ryan, Edited by T.F. O'Sullivan, M. H. Gill & Son Ltd, Dublin, 1945

Parliament of the United Kingdom
New constituency	Member of Parliament for East Galway; 1885 – 1890	Succeeded by John Roche
