= Frank Shawe-Taylor =

Irish land agent

Frank Shawe-Taylor (1869 – 3 March 1920) was an Irish land agent and ex-High Sheriff of County Galway who was killed in an IRA ambush during the Irish War of Independence.

== Background to the dispute ==
Land disputes in Ireland had been a contentious issue for much of the 19th century, with tenants of landlords insisting on fixity of tenure, which later grew into a demand to own their own land. In addition, The Land Purchase (Ireland) Act 1903 enabled the transfer of about 9 million acres (36,000 km²), up to 1914, from landlords to tenants. However, tenure and ownership of land was still a live issue on the eve of the Irish War of Independence.

== Shawe-Taylor ==
Frank Shawe-Taylor was a member of the Taylor family of Castle Taylor, Ardrahan. He was related to Lady Gregory, and another member of the family was Captain John Shawe-Taylor.

Frank had served as High Sheriff of County Galway in 1915.

In 1920 he was married with a family, living at Moorpark House, Coshla, Athenry, where he was a land agent to a local landlord, and was himself a tenant.

== The dispute ==
Early in January 1920, a group of local IRA soldiers (including Mick Kelly, Bill Freaney and Larry Lardner) approached Shawe-Taylor on behalf of some local people who were requesting a road to travel to Mass. While Shawe-Taylor himself was amenable to their demands, his landlord refused them outright and made this known via Shawe-Taylor.

=== The shooting ===
On 3 March 1920, Shawe-Taylor and his driver, Barrett, were making their way to Galway to attend the fair. At 6 a.m. the coach reached Egan's Pub, Coshla, where they found the road blocked. The donkey cart of a local, Johnny Kelly, had been stolen and placed across the road. From behind the wall, at least two shooters fired at Barrett and Shawe-Taylor, wounding the former and killing the latter. This resulted in a huge security presence in the area, which in turn led to more unrest with the locals. This increased with the arrival of the Black and Tans, whose irregular methods resulted in shootings, assaults, rapes and deaths. Moorpark House was placed under Royal Irish Constabulary protection out of fear of further killings.

=== Aftermath ===
Other people who subsequently died as a result of the unrest in Galway included Ellen Quinn (1 November 1920), a pregnant mother of six and a tenant of Lady Gregory; Fr. Michael Griffin (14 November 1920); Tom Egan and Patrick and Harry Loughnane (two brothers). In addition, there were numerous incidents of violence, many of which were recorded with horror by Lady Gregory in her journal, who remarked that "the country has gone wild since the killing of Frank Shawe-Taylor."

Local republican Bill Freaney at one point planned to burn Moorpark House in 'revenge' for the death of Tom Egan (which itself was thought to be a reprisal for Shawe-Taylor's killing), but was dissuaded by Mrs. Egan. Freaney himself was burned to death in Athenry in 1921. No one was ever tried for Frank Shawe-Taylor's killing, though the identities of those involved were known to some locals at the time. His widow eventually sold their property, and with her young children moved to England.

== Family ==
Shawe-Taylor is buried in St. Mary's graveyard, Athenry. The music critic, Desmond Shawe-Taylor (1907–1995) and British racing driver Brian Shawe-Taylor (1915–1999) were among his children. His grandson is Desmond Shawe-Taylor, Surveyor of the Queen's Pictures from 2005 to 2020.

== See also ==
- Land War
- Three Fs
- Irish Parliamentary Party
