= Joe Howley =

Joseph Howley, from Oranmore, County Galway, was a member of the Irish Volunteers. He mobilized and led a combined contingent of 106 Volunteers from Oranmore to attack the Oranmore barracks on the Tuesday morning of the 1916 Easter Rising. The company failed to capture the barracks, and joined those of Liam Mellows.

Howley was shot dead by the R.I.C at the Broadstone Railway Station in Dublin, Ireland, on 4 December 1920. A special Intelligence Unit attached to the RIC known as the Cairo Gang was responsible. A memorial statue to him was erected in 1947 in Howley Court in Oranmore; its inscription reads:

Comdt. Joseph Howley. He led his volunteers in Easter week 1916 and was murdered by English agents at the Broadstone Dublin 1920. Erected in 1947 by his old comrades of 1916 - 1920.

== See also ==
- Pádraig Ó Fathaigh
