= Galway City Museum =

Local museum in Ireland

Coordinates: 53.26984°N 9.05351°W

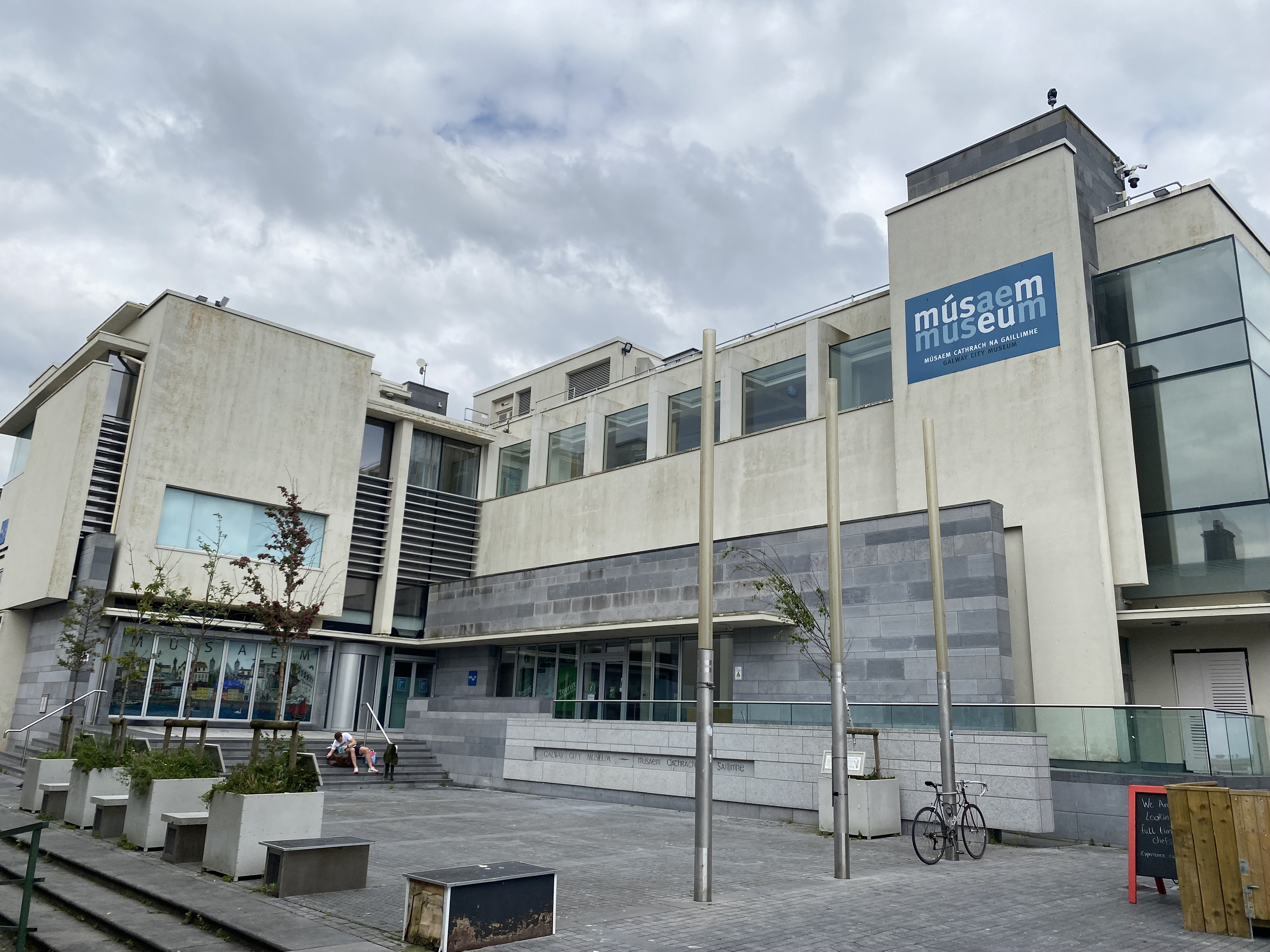
- Established: 2006
- Location: Spanish Arch, Galway, Ireland
- Type: Local Authority Museum
- Visitors: 161,558 (2011)
- Director: Brendán Ó hEaghra
- Website: Galway City Museum

Galway City Museum (Irish: Músaem Cathrach na Gaillimhe, IPA:[ˈmˠuːsˠeːmʲˈkahɾˠəxˈnˠaˈɡal̪ʲəvʲə]) is a museum in Galway City, County Galway, Ireland. It was founded on 29 July 2006, and is located beside the Spanish Arch.

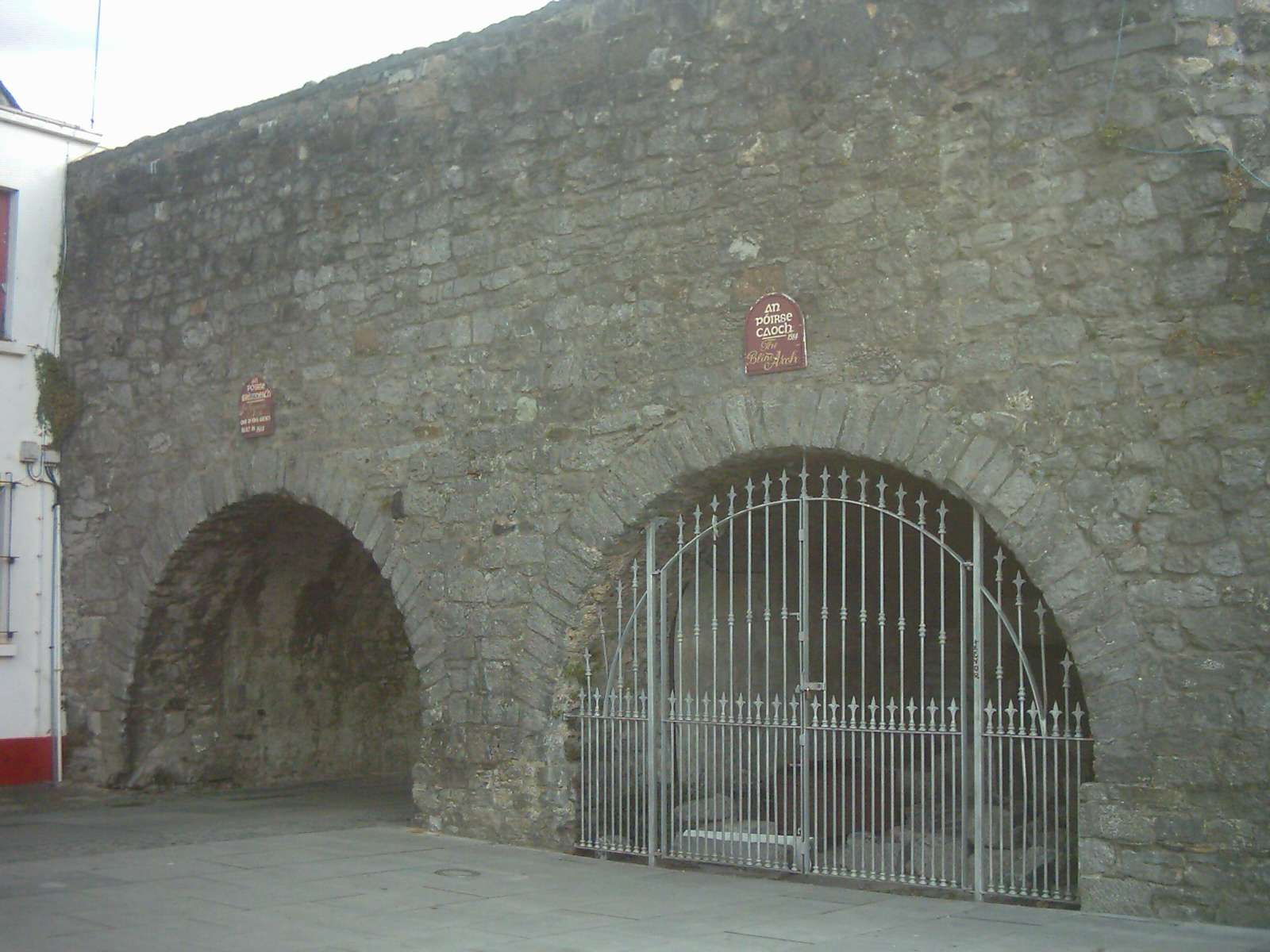
Spanish Arch

== History ==
=== Origin ===
Galway City Museum was founded in 1976. It was originally located in Comerford House, which prior to this had been the home of artist Clare Sheridan. The museum began as a residual collection of medieval stones from the city, acquired by Sheridan. Curated by Etienne Ryan, Michael Keaney, Bill Scanlan and Jim Higgins the museum built up a general folklife, industrial and militia collection.

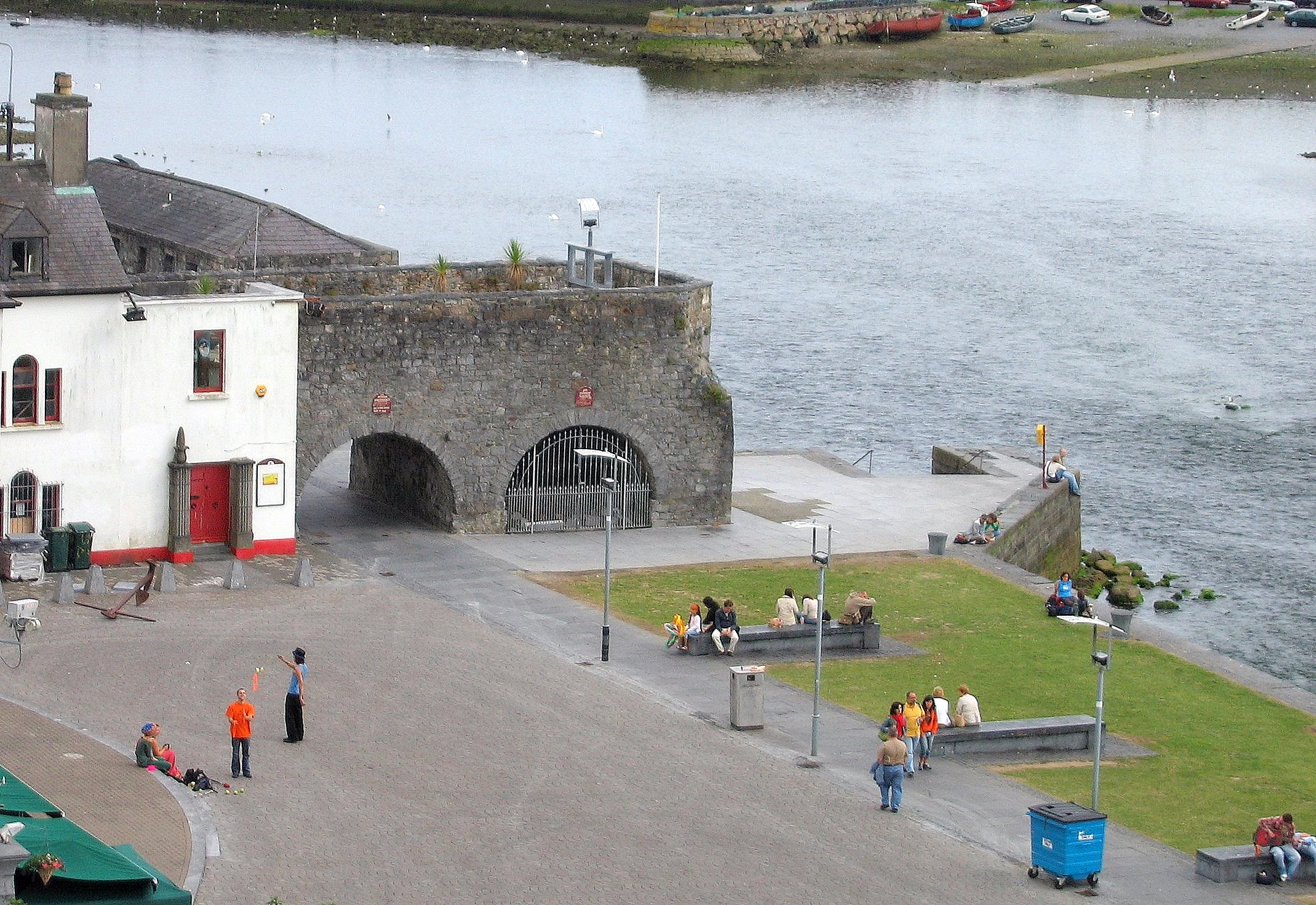
View of Comerford House and the Spanish Arch, beside the River Corrib

==== Comerford House ====
Comerford House is a historic property that was donated to the Galway City Council by the Comerford family for the intention of community care and purpose. The house was built c. 1800 as a private house, originally lived in by the Comerford family and later by the Greenwood family. Clare Consuelo Sheridan (1885–1970), sculptor, journalist, writer and first cousin of Sir Winston Churchill, lived at Comerford House between the years 1948 and 1954.

The building became part of Galway Corporation's administration offices for a period, before Galway City Museum was founded in 1976. This museum closed in 2004.

=== New museum building ===
In April 2007 a new purpose built museum building was opened, behind the site of the old museum at Comerford House. The new Galway City Museum project was the initiative of Galway City Council to advance the cultural and heritage life of Galway City. The building was designed by Ciaran O’Connor and Ger Harvey, architects with the Office of Public Works, who were contracted by the Galway City Council. The new museum is located along the River Corrib beside the Spanish Arch, a protected monument which formed part of the defensive medieval wall that once surrounded the city of Galway. The design of the building creates a plaza or square between the museum and the Spanish Arch; a public space which is at times used for civic events.

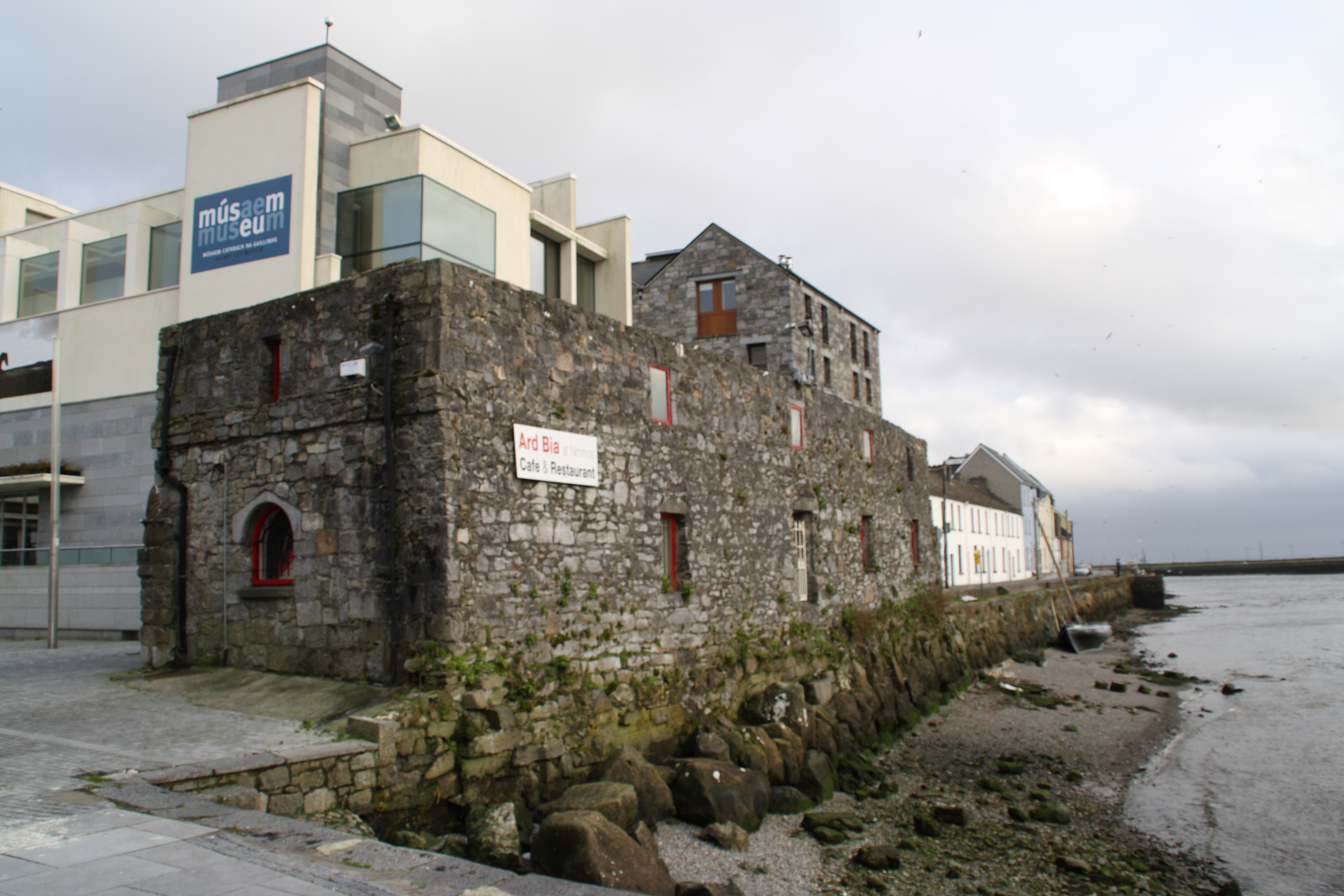
Partial View of the Galway City Museum from the Spanish Arch

The plan of the museum is composed in an 'L' shape and was restricted to three levels in order to maintain the scale of the surrounding buildings. The project was completed in 2006 and resulted in a space of 2,100 metres squared with a final cost of €6,890,000. The architects of the building won the Bank of Ireland Opus Architectural Award for their design in 2006.

== Museum collection ==
Galway City Museum collects, preserves and displays materials relating to the history of Galway City; Archaeology, Art, Geology, Natural History, Social, Political and Industrial History and Folklife. The museum began as a collection of medieval stones acquired by artist Claire Sheridan of Comerford House and, over the years expanded to include general folk life, industrial and militia objects.

In April 2007 the new purpose built museum building was opened, located behind the site of Comerford House. The new building houses the collections of the previous city museum, as well as objects acquired for the new facility, although the majority of the collection is that which was inherited from Comerford House. The Comerford House collection includes almost 1,000 objects relating to various periods in history, collected over a period of about thirty years.

=== Permanent collection ===
- DJ Murphy Collection:

Consists of over three hundred mainly farm and industrial implements, mainly from Galway County. The collection also includes some rare straw items objects relating to traditional Irish rural life

- Medieval Stone Collection:

Various carvings and architectural fragments which date mainly to the 16th and 17th century Galway City. It includes chimney pieces, corbels, armorial plaques and heraldic panels. The collection also includes two complete fireplaces and the Atty Doorway dating to 1577.

One of the fireplaces dates to 1615 and is from the Slate House Nunery, Kirwins Lane. The second, also from the 17th century, bears the arms from the Lynch and Henry families and originates from a house in High Street.

Many pieces in this collection pertain to buildings which are no longer in existence and are associated with families of the Tribes of Galway.

- Galway Militia Artefacts:

Objects relating to the Connaught Rangers, which belonged to Galwegians who fought in various wars, from the Crimea War to the First and Second World Wars.

- Claddagh Collection:

A collection relating to the history of the Claddagh, in particular the Claddagh apron and shawl. It also includes a model of the layout of the Claddagh village in the early 20th century.

- Maritime Collection:

A selection of fishing boats, navigation books, an Aldis lamp and the boat building tools of John Reney. Reney is regarded as the last of the Claddagh's boat builders and his building yard was formerly adjacent to the site of the new museum.

- 19th and 20th Century Galway:

A collection of objects relating to 19th and 20th century shops, public houses and business in Galway, including Persse's Whiskey Distillery (Lady Gregory was a member of this family), Young's Hibernian Mineral Water Works, clay pipe factories and a receipt book from one of the Magdalene Launderies or Magdalene asylums.

- Derek Biddulph Photographic Collection:

A series of photographs from Galway-based artist Derek Biddulph which document the city from the 1950s onwards

- Art Collection:

Tiger Lillies, a painting, and a carving of the Madonna and Child by artist Clare Sheridan, previous resident of the former museum at Comerford House. Also, Cecil Maguire's painting of "Bridie and Galway John outside Kenny".

There are approximately 1,000 items in the total permanent collection.

=== Collections on loan ===
In addition to the permanent collection, Galway City Museum also retains on loan from a number of sources;

- Civic Collection:

The Civic Sword and Mace. The sword dates from the Charter of King James I, which gave authority in 1610 for the carrying of such a weapon before the mayor. Edward Eyre, Mayor of Galway, presented the mace, manufactured in Dublin in 1710, to the town of Galway in 1712.

The Daly Collection, which includes a twenty-four paintings and four sculptures on loan to Galway City Council from the estate of the late Peter Francis Daly. It includes works from artists such as John Constable, Paul Henry, Sir John Lavery, Roderic O'Conor, Walter Frederick Osborne, George Russell, Leo Whelan and Jack Butler Yeats.

A rare copy of the 1651 pictorial map, printed by the Galway Archaeological and Historical Society in 1901.

A statue of Pádraic Ó Conaire (1882–1928), carved by Albert Power. The statue was relocated to the museum from its previous location of Eyre Square, Galway.

Royal Arms of George III, dated to the early 19th century, it was formerly in the Town Court House, now the Town Hall Theatre, Galway.

- National Museum of Ireland:

A collection of objects primarily from the Galway City Excavations Project 1987–98. The loan includes 9 coins (Philip II Spanish; two Elizabeth I Irish 1601 pennies; James II Irish gun money 1s or 6d; William III Irish 1696 half penny; George III Irish 1805 half penny; James II Irish gun money 1690; half penny token Dominick French 1664; George II Irish 1741 half penny); pottery (Saintonge, Portuguese faience and Meridia Ware); wine bottles and artillery (cannonball and musket shot).

- Dominican Order of Nuns, Galway:

Consists of a collection of church silverware and textiles from the 18th century, which includes chalices, candlesticks, a host box, an altar frontal and a reliquary casket of St. Ursula made by Richard Joyce. Joyce is popularly acclaimed to be the original designer of the Claddagh ring.

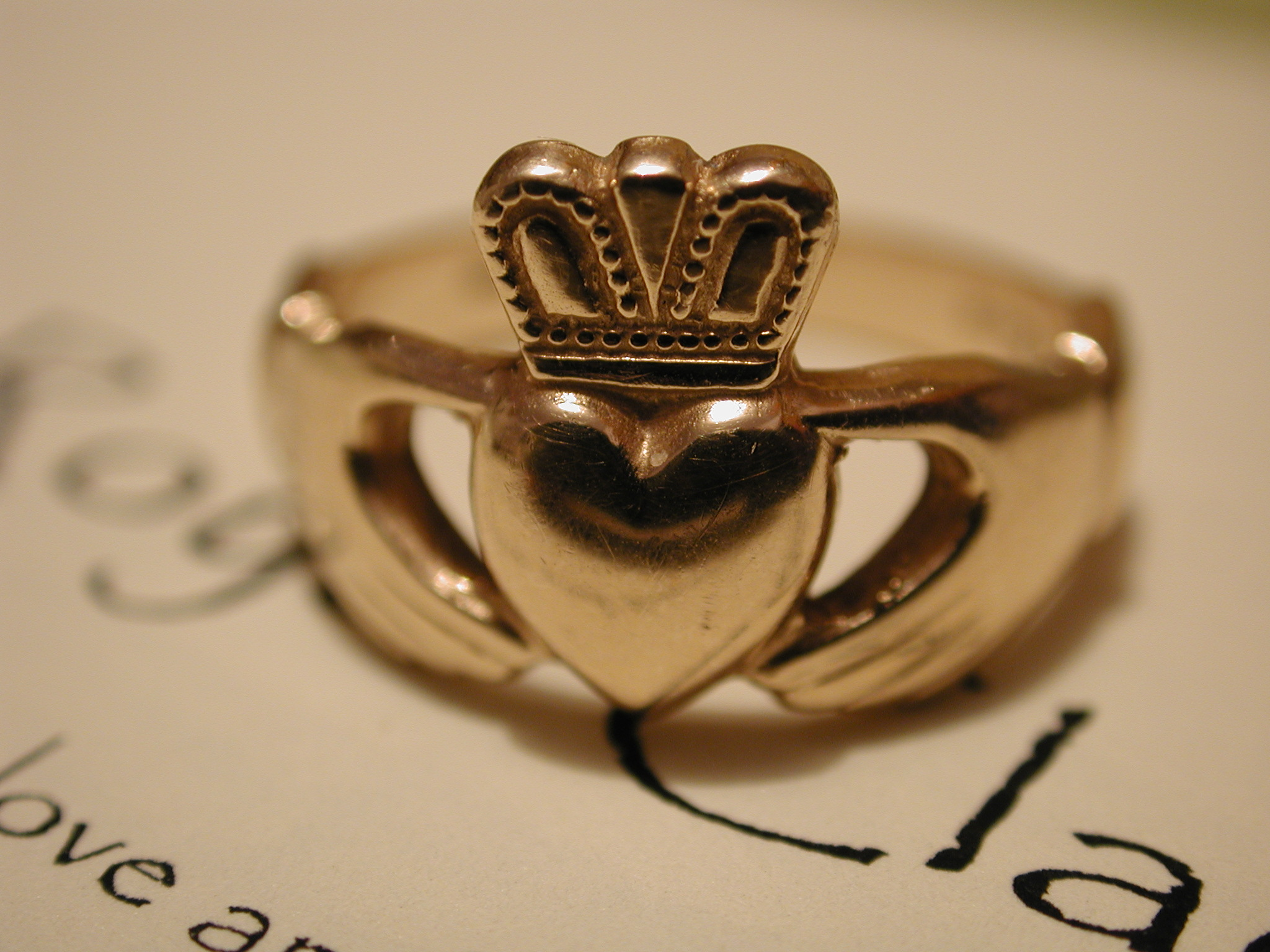
A contemporary version of the Claddagh Ring

- Sisters of Mercy, Galway:

A chalice and a patton dating to the 17th century and silver cutlery dating to the 19th century. The cutlery was given to the order by Fr. Daly, a popular figure of 19th century Galway, as a compensation for the mismanagement of convent funds. The silverware had been originally presented to Fr. Daly for his contribution in developing the town, such as bringing railway to Galway.

- Others:

A variety of objects on loan from individual members of the public

The total loan collection of Galway City Museum is approximately 90 items.

== Exhibitions ==
The museum today hosts a variety of permanent and touring exhibitions. The permanent exhibitions include; Routes to the Past (Pre-Historic Galway); Galway Within the Walls (Medieval Galway); Pádraic Ó Conaire: Man and Statue;Dance Hall Days; Cinema in Galway; and Galway and the Wars of Empire. Temporary exhibitions have included; Jack B. Yeats’, 'Between Art and Industry' and 'Uisce agus Bheatha/ Water and Life', an exhibition regarding the heritage of people, places, boats and water.

== National Museum of Ireland designation ==
In February 2010 Galway City Museum received the designated status under the National Cultural Institutions Act, 1997, joining the eleven other Irish local authority museums already designated. This status entitles the museum to retain archaeological objects for and behalf of the Irish State.
