= East Galway (UK Parliament constituency) =

UK parliamentary constituency in Ireland, 1885–1922

- Former county constituency for the House of Commons

1885–1922
- Seats: 1
- Created from: County Galway
- Replaced by: Galway

East Galway was a UK Parliament constituency in Ireland, returning one Member of Parliament from 1885 to 1922.

Prior to the 1885 United Kingdom general election the area was part of the County Galway constituency. From 1922, on the establishment of the Irish Free State, it was not represented in the UK Parliament.

== Boundaries ==
This constituency comprised the eastern part of County Galway. In 1918, the boundaries were adjusted to take account of transfers of territory between County Galway and County Roscommon under the 1898 Local Government Act.

1885–1918: The baronies of Clonmacnowen, Kilconnell, Killian, Longford and Tiaquin.

1918–1922: The rural districts of Ballinasloe No. 1, Mountbellew and Portumna, the district electoral divisions of Cappalusk, Cloonkeen, Colmanstown, Graigabbey, Grange, Killimor and Tiaquin in the rural district of Loughrea, and the urban district of Ballinasloe.

== Members of Parliament ==
Election	Member	Party
1885	Matthew Harris	Irish Parliamentary Party
1890 by-election	John Roche	Irish Parliamentary Party
1890^{1}	John Roche	Irish National Federation
1914 by-election	James Cosgrave	Irish Parliamentary Party
1918	Liam Mellows	Sinn Féin
1921	Constituency merged into Galway (Dáil constituency)	

== Elections ==
=== Elections in the 1880s ===
1885 general election: East Galway
Party	Candidate	Votes	%	±%
Irish Parliamentary	Matthew Harris	4,866	93.3	
Liberal	Richard Anthony Nugent	352	6.7	
Majority		4,514	86.6	
Turnout		5,218	64.6	
Registered electors		8,083		
Irish Parliamentary win (new seat)				

1886 general election: East Galway
Party	Candidate	Votes	%	±%
Irish Parliamentary	Matthew Harris	Unopposed		
Irish Parliamentary hold				

=== Elections in the 1890s ===
By-election, 1890: East Galway
Party	Candidate	Votes	%	±%
Irish Parliamentary	John Roche	Unopposed		
Irish Parliamentary hold				

1892 general election: East Galway
Party	Candidate	Votes	%	±%
Irish National Federation	John Roche	3,382	77.6	N/A
Irish National League	James Lynam	974	22.4	N/A
Majority		2,408	55.2	N/A
Turnout		4,356	54.2	N/A
Registered electors		8,034		
Irish National Federation gain from Irish Parliamentary		Swing	N/A	

1895 general election: East Galway
Party	Candidate	Votes	%	±%
Irish National Federation	John Roche	Unopposed		
Irish National Federation hold				

=== Elections in the 1900s ===
1900 general election: East Galway
Party	Candidate	Votes	%	±%
Irish Parliamentary	John Roche	Unopposed		
Irish Parliamentary hold				

1906 general election: East Galway
Party	Candidate	Votes	%	±%
Irish Parliamentary	John Roche	Unopposed		
Irish Parliamentary hold				

=== Elections in the 1910s ===
January 1910 general election: East Galway
Party	Candidate	Votes	%	±%
Irish Parliamentary	John Roche	Unopposed		
Irish Parliamentary hold				

December 1910 general election: East Galway
Party	Candidate	Votes	%	±%
Irish Parliamentary	John Roche	Unopposed		
Irish Parliamentary hold				

By-election 1914: East Galway
Party	Candidate	Votes	%	±%
Irish Parliamentary	James Cosgrave	Unopposed		
Irish Parliamentary hold				

1918 general election: East Galway
Party	Candidate	Votes	%	±%
Sinn Féin	Liam Mellows	Unopposed		
Sinn Féin gain from Irish Parliamentary				
