= Liam Mellows =

Irish republican and politician (1892–1922)

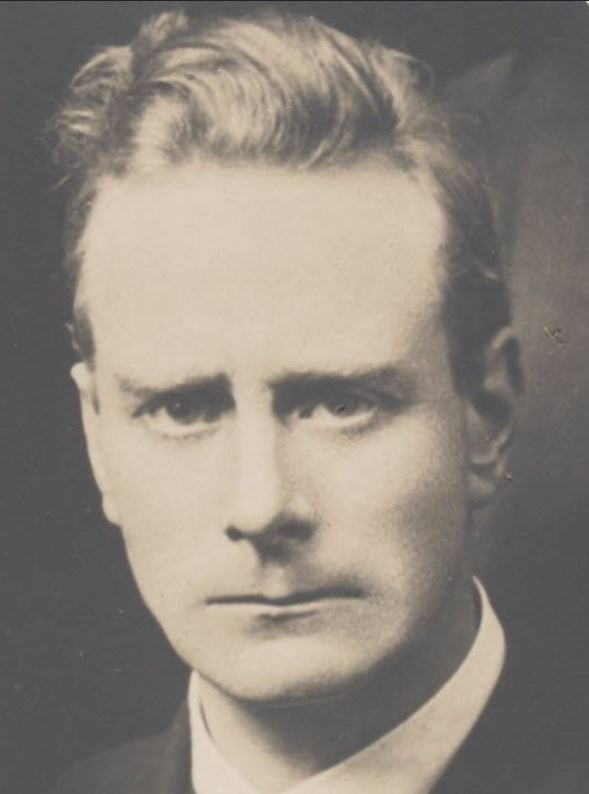
- Mellows, c. 1920s

Teachta Dála
- In office May 1921 – June 1922
- Constituency: Galway
- In office December 1918 – May 1921
- Constituency: Both East Galway and North Meath

Personal details
- Born: 25 May 1892 Ashton-under-Lyne, England
- Died: 8 December 1922 (aged 30) Dublin, Ireland
- Party: Sinn Féin
- Relatives: Barney Mellows (brother)

Military service
- Branch/service: Irish Republican Army; Anti-Treaty IRA
- Rank: Commandant general
- Battles/wars: Easter Rising; Irish War of Independence; Irish Civil War

William Joseph Mellows (Irish: Liam Ó Maoilíosa, 25 May 1892 – 8 December 1922) was an Irish republican and Sinn Féin politician. Born in England to an English father and Irish mother, he grew up in Ashton-under-Lyne before moving to Ireland, being raised in Cork, Dublin and his mother's native Wexford. He was active with the Irish Republican Brotherhood and Irish Volunteers, and participated in the Easter Rising in County Galway and the War of Independence. Elected as a TD to the First Dáil, he rejected the Anglo-Irish Treaty. During the Irish Civil War Mellows was captured by Pro-Treaty forces after the surrender of the Four Courts in June 1922. On 8 December 1922 he was one of four senior IRA men executed by the free state Government.

== Early life ==
Mellows was born at the Hartshead Military Barracks in Ashton-under-Lyne on 25 May 1892, the son of William Joseph Mellows, an English man who worked as an NCO in the British Army, and Sarah Jordan, an Irish woman from Inch, County Wexford.

His family moved to 10 Annadale Avenue in the Fairview area of Dublin in February 1895, when his father was transferred there; Mellows remained in Wexford with his grandfather, Patrick Jordan, due to ill health. He attended the military school in Wellington Barracks in Cork and the Portobello garrison school in Dublin, but ultimately refused a military career much to his father's disappointment, instead working as a clerk in several Dublin firms, including the Junior Army & Navy Stores on D'Olier Street.

== Career ==
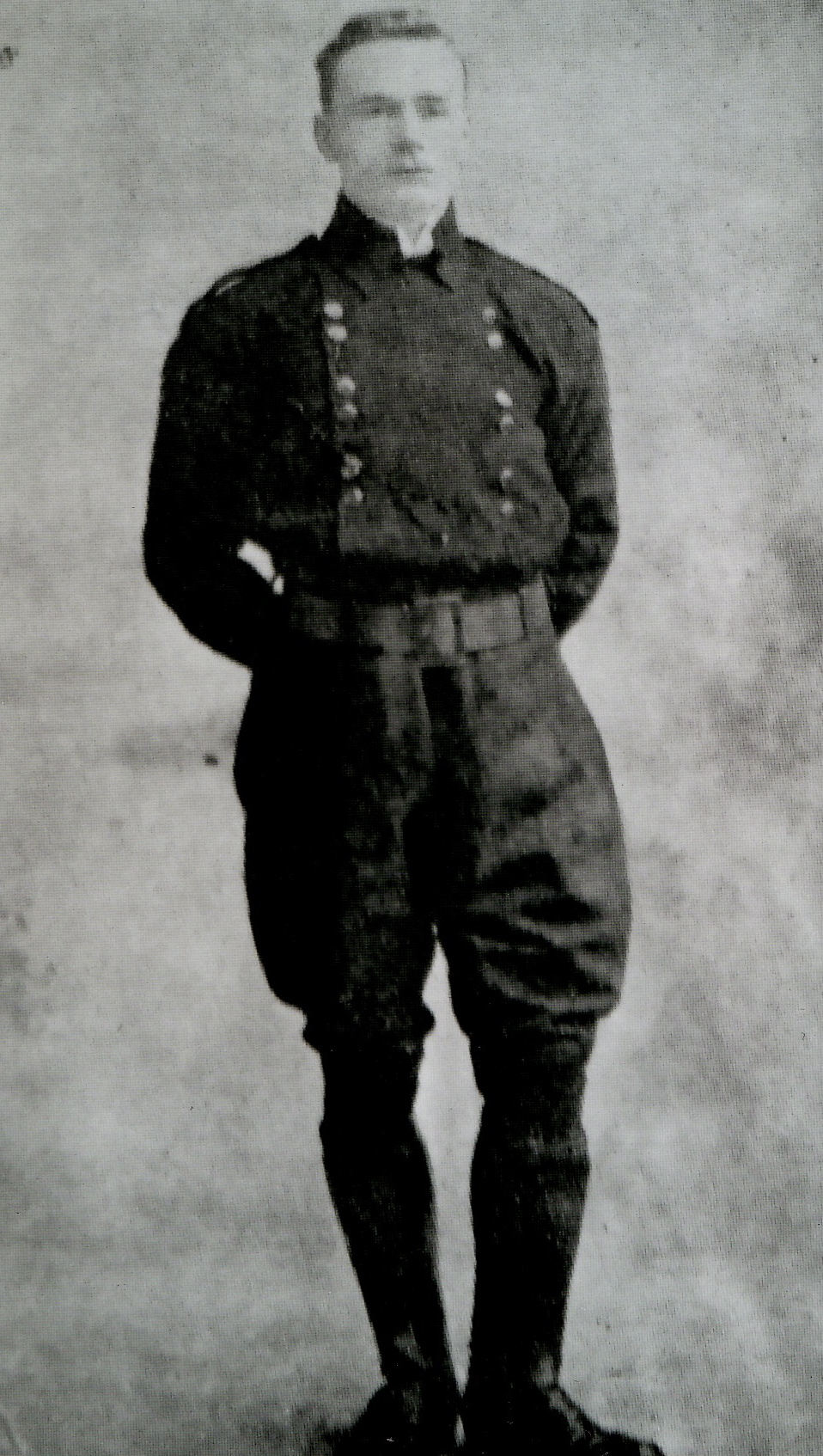
Mellows in uniform

=== Entry into politics ===
Mellows was an Irish nationalist from an early age. In 1911, he purchased a copy of Irish Freedom, which began: "We stand for Ireland..." He approached Thomas Clarke in his shop, who recruited him into Fianna Éireann, an organisation of young republicans. He also met secretary Patrick O'Ryan, Con Colbert and Eamon Martin, who would be a lifelong friend. At the next meeting, Mellows' brothers all signed up. On 7 April 1911, he was sworn to secrecy by the Irish Republican Brotherhood.

Mellows was proposed for the post of organiser and travelling instructor. He founded the sluagh at Dolphins Barn, County Wexford, which was a success. He established more sluagdste at Ferns and Enniscorthy in Easter 1912. Mellows cycled everywhere, which was cheap and convenient; he was promoted to the rank of captain by the ard choisde. In June 1913, Mellows stayed at Waterford IRB Centre with Liam Walsh in the Gaelic League Room, Williams Street.

Mellows was organising sports in Tuam in September 1913 when he was introduced to socialist James Connolly at Countess Markievicz's residence, where Connolly was recuperating after his hunger strike. Connolly was deeply impressed and told his daughter Nora: "I have found a real man". Mellows was called back to Dublin on 25 November 1913. He was active in the IRB and was a founder member of the Irish Volunteers, being brought onto its organising committee to strengthen the Fianna representation. He was given a full-time job at 30s a week. Mellows joined forces with Éamonn Ceannt and Sir Horace Plunkett at the Provisional Committee choosing to support the parliamentary route taken by Roger Casement. But as an employee he was compelled to agree with Redmondite candidates, although he had voted against the Nationalists' pro-British policy.

He was arrested and jailed on several occasions under the Defence of the Realm Act. On 1 August, Mellows' company was taking an arms shipment from Howth to Dublin and fired on the RIC at Clontarf. That evening Éamon de Valera took him by car to Kilcoole. Guns were loaded on a charabanc in Bray at night and then distributed in Dublin from a fleet of taxis. Mellows was sent to Galway and made his base at Athenry. There he met Seán Mac Diarmada and was appointed as election scrutineer at Tuam. On Sunday 18 May 1915, the two men were at an anti-enlistment rally when they were challenged at gunpoint by police inspector Comerford. Mac Diarmada was searched, arrested and jailed. Mellows, however, got away and started a training group at Kynoch's Fort, south Galway, recruiting men from miles around.

On 1 July, he was arrested at Courtown Harbour and jailed for three months. He was sent to Mountjoy Prison. Months later Mellows was with volunteers at Tullamore when they were attacked by machine-guns. Fleeing the scene over rooftops, they made off by motorbike. Mellows returned to post a letter and assist his comrades. A week later he was arrested at the house of Julia Morrissey. The British took him by train to Arbour Hill Prison, before he was shipped to Leek, England.

=== 1916 Easter Rising ===
Eventually escaping from Reading Gaol he returned to Ireland to command the "Western Division" (forces operating in the West of Ireland) of the IRA during the Easter Rising of 1916. He led roughly 700 Volunteers in abortive attacks on Royal Irish Constabulary stations at Oranmore, and Clarinbridge in county Galway taking over the town of Athenry. However, his men were very badly armed and supplied and they dispersed after a week, when British troops and the cruiser Gloucester were sent west to attack them. In the aftermath of the Uprising over three hundred Galway Volunteers were deported to jails across England and Scotland. Mellows and a number of other local IRA leaders were able to evade capture after the station master of Athenry, James Miggins, delayed a detachment of incoming British troops.

=== Time in America ===
Mellows' entry documents for the USA, bearing the incorrect name Edward Moore and listing Tralee as his alleged place of birth

After this insurrection failed, Mellows escaped to the United States, where he was arrested and detained without trial in the "Tombs" prison, New York, on a charge of attempting to aid the German side in the First World War. This was in the context of incidents like the Black Tom and Kingsland explosions, where German agents had bombed neutral American ports and industrial facilities.

After his release in 1918, he worked with John Devoy and helped to organise Éamon de Valera's fund raising visit to America in 1919–1920. He returned to Ireland to become Irish Republican Army "Director of Supplies" during the Irish War of Independence, responsible for buying arms. At the 1918 general election, he was elected to the First Dáil as a Sinn Féin candidate for both Galway East and for Meath North.

=== Opponent of the Treaty ===
Mellows considered the Anglo-Irish Treaty as signed to be a betrayal of the Irish Republic, saying in the Treaty Debates of 1921–1922:

We do not seek to make this country a materially great country at the expense of its honour in any way whatsoever. We would rather have this country poor and indigent, we would rather have the people of Ireland eking out a poor existence on the soil; as long as they possessed their souls, their minds, and their honour. This fight has been for something more than the fleshpots of Empire.

He rejected the arguments from the pro-Treaty side that it represented the will of the people. He argued that the people's will was for a republic and that their acceptance of treaty was only because of the threats of the British government: "That is not the will of the people, that is the fear of the people".

A conference of nine TDs was deputed to meet privately on 5 January 1922 to resolve the dispute and to achieve a unified front by compromise. The four other anti-Treaty TDs said there was agreement but Mellows did not, and was seen thereafter by pro-Treaty TDs as one of their most implacable opponents. The following day the Dáil voted to approve the Treaty by a majority of 64 to 57. Details on the private conference and the private Dáil session debate were not made public until the 1970s.

He wrote a social programme based on the Dáil's Democratic Programme of 1919 aimed at winning popular support for the anti-Treaty cause.

== Civil war and execution ==
Mellows was one of the more strident TDs on the approach to the Irish Civil War. On 28 April 1922 he told the Dáil:

There would be no question of civil war here now were it not for the undermining of the Republic. The Republic has been deserted by those who state they still intend to work for a Republic. The Volunteers can have very little faith at this moment in the Government that assembles here, because all they can see in it is a chameleon Government. One moment, when they look at it, it is the green, white and orange of the Republic, and at another moment, when they look at it, it is the red, white and blue of the British Empire. We in the Army, who have taken this step, have been termed 'mutineers,' 'irregulars' and so forth. We are not mutineers, because we have remained loyal to our trust. We are not mutineers except against the British Government in this country. We may be 'irregular' in the sense that funds are not forthcoming to maintain us, but we were always like that and it is no disgrace to be called 'irregulars' in that sense. We are not wild people.

Mellows, the quartermaster-general with the rank of commandant general, was one of a number of senior figures in the Anti-Treaty IRA faction that had occupied the Four Courts since April. However, on 28 June the building was bombarded by pro-Treaty Free State forces and the IRA garrison was forced to surrender after two days. Mellows had a chance to escape along with Ernie O'Malley, but did not take it (see also Battle of Dublin). While in the Four Courts Mellows expressed his opinion on the revolutionary spirit of the Irish people, stating that "It will come back again with a new generation, but not in our time. We can do no more than hand on the torch."

Imprisoned in Mountjoy Gaol in the Phibsborough area of Dublin, Mellows (along with Rory O'Connor, Joe McKelvey and Dick Barrett) was executed by firing squad on 8 December 1922, in reprisal for the shooting of Pro-Treaty TD Seán Hales (see executions during the Irish Civil War). These executions, and their effects on their fellow prisoners, are described in Peadar O'Donnell's Irish Civil War memoir The Gates Flew Open.

== Ideology ==
In 1922, the Labour Party posthumously published a document entitled "Liam Mellow's Jail Programme", based on notes Mellows had smuggled out of jail after being captured by the Irish Free State. In this document, Mellows outlines a ten-point programme he proposed that the Anti-Treaty IRA adopt in 1922:

1. Ownership and control of all heavy industries by the state for the benefit of all the people
2. Complete ownership of the transport system by the state
3. State ownership of all banks
4. Confiscation of all the large ranches and estates, without compensation to the landed aristocracy, and the distribution of the land among the landless farmers and agricultural labourers. Election of joint councils representatives of these two classes to distribute and manage the land. Abolition of all forms of tenure and indebtedness either to private owners or to the state. Cancellation of all debts and mortgages.
5. Establishment of an all-around shorter working day
6. Control of workshop conditions, to be vested in a joint council representing the workers' Trade Unions concerned and the state
7. Municipalisation of all public services: Trams, light, heat, water, etc and free use by the workers
8. Compulsory rationing of all available household accommodation and the abolishing of all rents
9. Full maintenance for the unemployed at full Trade Union rates until useful work at Trade Union rates of wages can be provided
10. The universal arming of all workers in the town and country to defend their rights

Mellows wrote that "James Connolly realised that if Ireland were really to be free, it must be owned by the Irish people; that it was little use freeing Ireland from foreign tyranny if, in the course of a comparatively short time, it would fall under domestic tyranny as other countries had done". Mellows had read Connolly's Labour in Irish History and agreed with his conclusions, although stated that he was not sure that he understood Connolly's Marxism.

Mellows has been described as having "broad internationalist sympathies". Explaining his opposition to the Treaty Mellows said "We are going into the British Empire now to participate in the Empire's shame, and the crucifixion of India and the degradation of Egypt. Is that what the Irish people fought for freedom for?". He also spoke on platforms of the 'Friends of Indian Freedom' organisation and in 1919 served on the central committee of the worldwide anti-imperialist organisation the 'League of Oppressed Peoples' as a representative of Ireland.

Pat Walsh opines that Mellows was not a Communist nor a Marxist, but simply a nationalist who, in a situation of desperation for the Republican forces who looked set to lose the Civil War, thought that only by bringing workers into the national struggle could the Republican forces survive. "It was with great reluctance," Walsh writes, "that Mellows advocated this course." Conor McNamara cautions against the "championing of Mellows as a lost socialist republican leader" and argues that Mellows' correspondence from prison did not represent a well thought-out economic or political strategy. Others consider him a socialist republican, while Diarmuid Ferriter observes that Mellows became "the poster boy for republican socialists". A socialist faction of the IRA in the late 1920s and 30s used the writing of Connolly and Mellows as their ideological basis and launched the political party Saor Éire.

Writing for An Phoblacht in January 2010, Sinn Fein's Eoin Ó Broin also discussed Mellows' Marxist political positions. In the article, Ó Broin quotes Mellows' "Jail notes", in which Mellows' applies Marxist theory to Ireland and advocates for a "People's Republic". Ó Broin concludes the article by suggesting that Sinn Féin should take up these positions.

== Commemoration ==
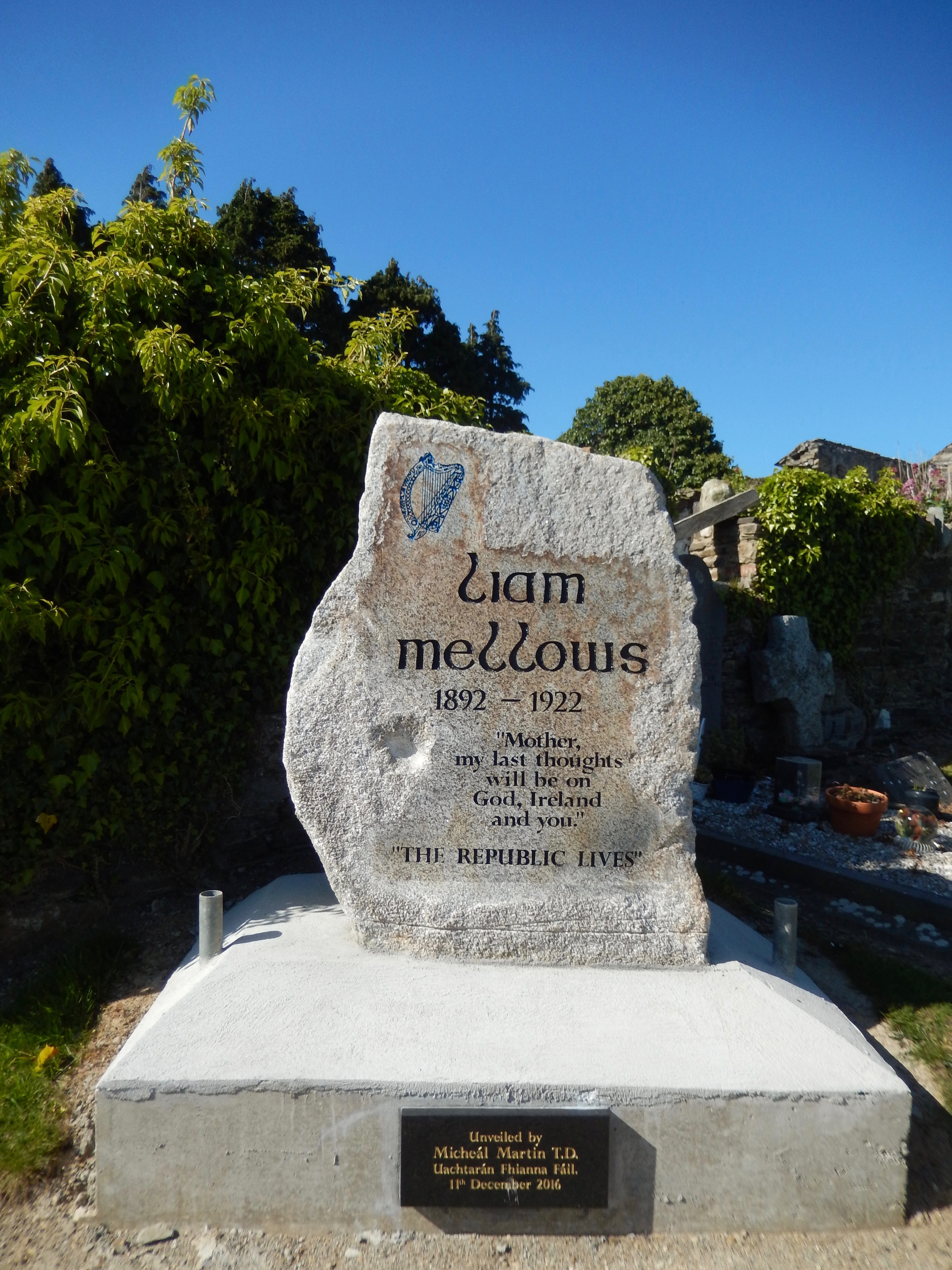
Liam Mellows Gravestone unveiled in 2016

Mellows is commemorated by statues in Eyre Square in Galway, in the official name of the Irish Defence Forces army barracks at Renmore (Dún Úi Maoilíosa) and in the naming of Mellows Bridge in Dublin. He is also commemorated in the names of two GAA clubs (one in Galway, and Castletown Liam Mellows GAA in Wexford), and by Unidare RFC in Ballymun and their "Liam Mellows Perpetual Cup". He is referred to by name in the Dominic Behan rewritten version of the rebel song Take It Down from the Mast.

Mellows is buried in Castletown cemetery, County Wexford, a few miles from Arklow. An annual commemoration ceremony is held at his grave site, in which a wreath is laid by a member of the Liam Mellows Commemoration committee. "Liam Mellows Avenue" in Arklow is named in his honour, as is "Liam Mellows Street" in Tuam, County Galway, Teagasc Rural Economy Research Centre "Mellows Campus", "Liam Mellows Park" in Renmore, Galway, Liam Mellows Terrace in Bohermore, Galway, Athenry, Galway and Wexford town, and Mellowes (sic) Road in Finglas, Dublin.

In 2016, Fianna Fáil leader Micheál Martin TD unveiled a new gravestone for Mellows.

In December 2019, a memorial statue was unveiled in Finglas.

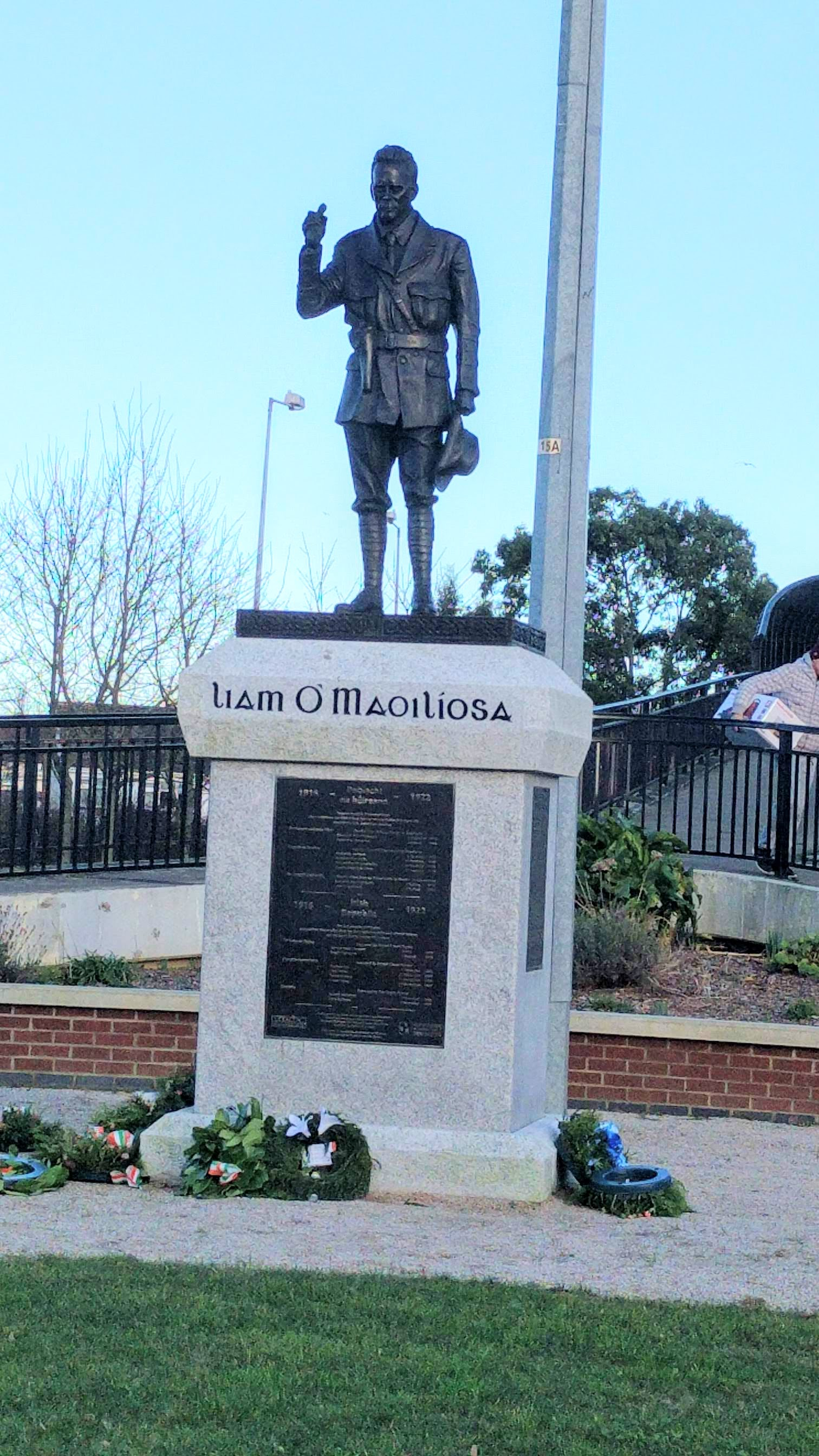
Liam Mellows memorial unveiled in 2019

British Army military intelligence file for William Mellowes

Parliament of the United Kingdom
Preceded by James Cosgrave	Member of Parliament for Galway East; 1918–1922	Constituency abolished
Preceded by Patrick White	Member of Parliament for North Meath; 1918–1922	Constituency abolished
Oireachtas
New constituency	Teachta Dála for East Galway; 1918–1921	Constituency abolished
New constituency	Teachta Dála for North Meath; 1918–1921	Constituency abolished

Dáil	Election	Deputy (Party)	Deputy (Party)	Deputy (Party)	Deputy (Party)	Deputy (Party)	Deputy (Party)	Deputy (Party)	Deputy (Party)	Deputy (Party)
2nd	1921	Liam Mellows (SF)	Bryan Cusack (SF)	Frank Fahy (SF)	Joseph Whelehan (SF)	Pádraic Ó Máille (SF)	George Nicolls (SF)	Patrick Hogan (SF)	7 seats 1921–1923	
3rd	1922	Thomas O'Connell (Lab)	Bryan Cusack (AT-SF)	Frank Fahy (AT-SF)	Joseph Whelehan (PT-SF)	Pádraic Ó Máille (PT-SF)	George Nicolls (PT-SF)	Patrick Hogan (PT-SF)	7 seats 1921–1923	
4th	1923	Thomas O'Connell (Lab)	Barney Mellows (Rep)	Frank Fahy (Rep)	Louis O'Dea (Rep)	Pádraic Ó Máille (CnaG)	George Nicolls (CnaG)	Patrick Hogan (CnaG)	Seán Broderick (CnaG)	James Cosgrave (Ind.)
5th	1927 (Jun)	Gilbert Lynch (Lab)	Thomas Powell (FF)	Frank Fahy (Note: Frank Fahy served as Ceann Comhairle from 9 March 1932.) (FF)	Seán Tubridy (FF)	Mark Killilea Snr (FF)	Martin McDonogh (CnaG)	Patrick Hogan (CnaG)	Seán Broderick (CnaG)	William Duffy (NL)
6th	1927 (Sep)	Stephen Jordan (FF)	Thomas Powell (FF)	Frank Fahy (FF)	Seán Tubridy (FF)	Mark Killilea Snr (FF)	Martin McDonogh (CnaG)	Patrick Hogan (CnaG)	Seán Broderick (CnaG)	Joseph Mongan (CnaG)
7th	1932	Stephen Jordan (FF)	Thomas Powell (FF)	Frank Fahy (FF)	Patrick Beegan (FF)	Gerald Bartley (FF)	Fred McDonogh (CnaG)	Patrick Hogan (CnaG)	Seán Broderick (CnaG)	Joseph Mongan (CnaG)
8th	1933	Stephen Jordan (FF)	Mark Killilea Snr (FF)	Frank Fahy (FF)	Patrick Beegan (FF)	Gerald Bartley (FF)	Séamus Keely (FF)	Patrick Hogan (CnaG)	Seán Broderick (CnaG)	Martin McDonogh (CnaG)
8th	1935 by-election	Stephen Jordan (FF)	Mark Killilea Snr (FF)	Frank Fahy (FF)	Patrick Beegan (FF)	Gerald Bartley (FF)	Séamus Keely (FF)	Patrick Hogan (CnaG)	Seán Broderick (CnaG)	Eamon Corbett (FF)
8th	1936 by-election	Stephen Jordan (FF)	Mark Killilea Snr (FF)	Frank Fahy (FF)	Patrick Beegan (FF)	Gerald Bartley (FF)	Séamus Keely (FF)	Martin Neilan (FF)	Seán Broderick (CnaG)	Eamon Corbett (FF)
9th	1937	Constituency abolished. See Galway East and Galway West								
