= Seoán Ó Leaáin =

Seoán Ó Leaáin, Bishop of Clonfert, 1322–1336. Ó Leaáin appears to have been a member of the same family as Mauricius Ó Leaáin (Bishop of Kilmacduagh 1254–1284), Nicol Ó Leaáin, (ditto, 1358–1393) and Gregorius Ó Leaáin (1394–1397).

Previously Archdeacon of Tuam. He was elected 10 November 1319, but wasn't appointed until 6 August 1322. Ó Leaáin was consecrated 20 September and received possession of temporalities 29 December 1322. After his death on 7 April 1336, the see lay vacant for as many as ten years. However, at some point prior to 14 October 1437, he was succeeded by a prince of the Ui Maine dynasty, Tomás mac Gilbert Ó Cellaigh.

== See also ==
- Noel Lane (born 1954), retired Galway Gaelic Athletic Association (GAA) manager
- Sylvie Linnane (born 1956) retired GAA sportsman

Catholic Church titles
Preceded by Robert Petit	Bishops of Clonfert; 1322–1336	Succeeded by Tomás mac Gilbert Ó Cellaigh
