= Irish Dominican College, Louvain =

The Irish Dominican College of Holy Cross, Louvain
- Collège des Dominicains Irlandais, Louvain (Collège de la Sainte Croix, Louvain)
- Latin: Collegii Sanctae Crucis Lovaniensis
- Type: Seminary
- Active: 1626–1797
- Religious affiliation: Dominican Order (Roman Catholic)
- Academic affiliations: Old University of Leuven

The Irish Dominican College, Louvain (French: Collège des Dominicains Irlandais, Louvain) or The Irish Dominican College of Holy Cross (French: Collège de la Sainte Croix, Louvain), was a college in Louvain, in the Spanish Netherlands (present day Belgium) set up during the Penal Laws to train Irish Dominican priests, to minister in Ireland.

== History ==
Following on from efforts from the provincial Nicholas Lynch and Thaddeaus O'Duan who obtained a residence for Irish students in Louvain in 1608, the college was founded in 1626, it was originally named after St. John the Baptist, the name of the church at Caser's fort, where it was founded, it was subsequently dedicated to St. Margaret. A priory built in 1650 and chapel in 1659, also in 1659 the college was fully incorporated into the Old University of Leuven/Louvain, and the college was renamed the College of the Holy Cross. Latin was the language used in the university.

The provincial at the time of its foundation was Roche Mac Geoghan. Daniel O'Daly, who set up the Dominican college in lisbon, taught theology and was appointed rector of Louvain in 1627 serving until 1629. Oliver Burke served as rector from 1634 to 1636, John Nolan (1639-1640), Dominic O'Kelly prior 1659-1660, and the Irish-born Bishop of New York John Connolly studied in the college.

== Closure ==
With the other colleges it was also suppressed in 1797, following the French revolution and French control of the Spanish Netherlands, the property sold and buildings destroyed in 1799–1800, the street name in La Rue des Dominicains Irlandais now in Flemish lerse Predikherenstraat (Irish Preachers' Street) is all that remains.

== People associated with the Irish Dominican College, Louvain ==
- William Barry, served as prior following defeat of James II
- Edmund Bourke OP, was regent of the Irish Dominican College in Louvain
- Pádraigín Haicéad OP, poet and dominican priest
- John O'Heyne OP, regent of studies (1685–8)
- Colman O'Shaughnessy OP, dominican friar, professor of theology, became Bishop of Ossory
- John Sheehan OP, was prior when the french seized the college after the revolution
