= Athenry Abbey =

Mediaeval priory in County Galway, Ireland

The Priory Church of Saint Peter and Saint Paul, Athenry
- Prióireacht Peadar agus Pól, Baile Átha an Rí
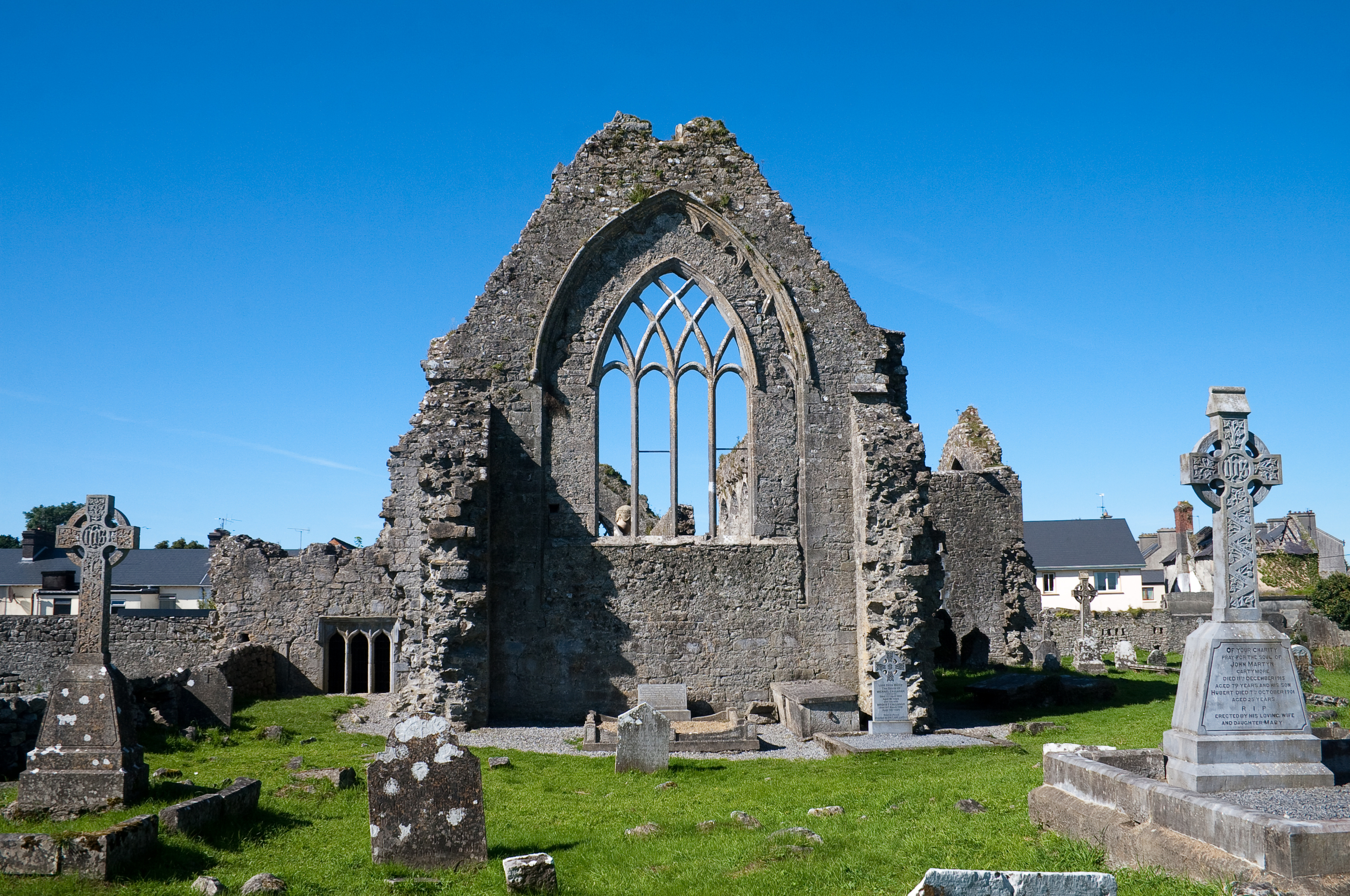
- East window

- Location within Ireland

Monastery information
- Other names: Ath-na-riogh; Ath-na-rig; Anry
- Order: Dominican Order
- Established: 1241
- Disestablished: 1574; 1698
- Diocese: Tuam

People
- Founder: Meyler de Bermingham

Architecture
- Status: ruined
- Style: Late Gothic

Site
- Location: Abbey Row, Athenry, County Galway
- Coordinates: 53.298236°N 8.744544°W
- Public access: yes

National monument of Ireland
- Official name: Athenry Abbey
- Reference no.: 164

The Priory Church of Saint Peter and Saint Paul, Athenry, also called Athenry Priory, is a medieval Dominican priory and National Monument located in Athenry, Ireland.

== Location ==
Athenry Abbey is located in the eastern part of Athenry, east of the Clarinbridge River. Meyler de Bermingham donated the land. The priory initially stood on the edge of the town walls, but was later enveloped by them. In 1451, the friars built a chapel on land north of the river at Carrowardahrah, granted by Ulick Ruadh Burke.

== History ==
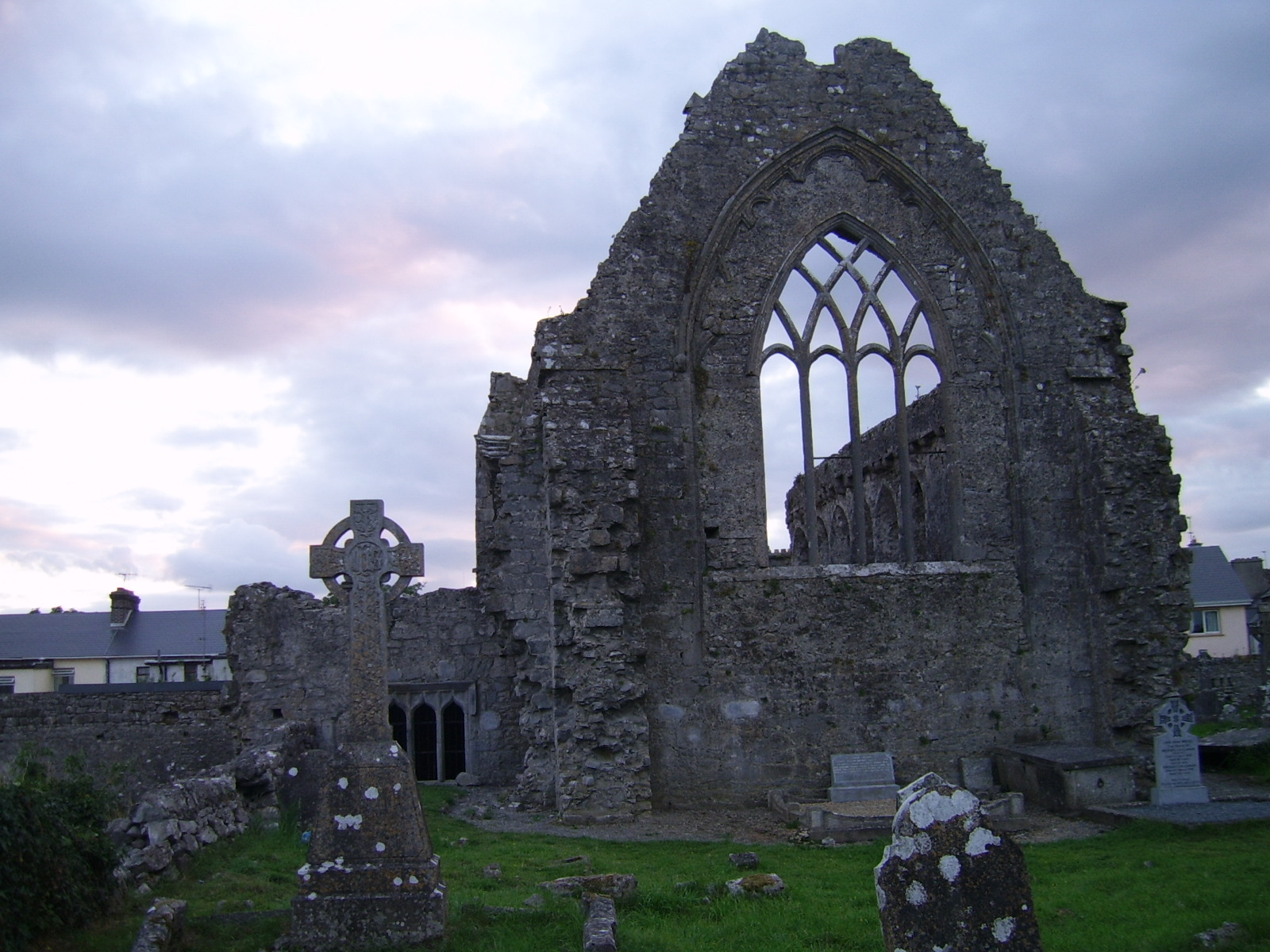
The great east window

Meyler de Bermingham founded the priory in 1241. A provincial chapter was held at Athenry in 1242.

Over time, local notables contributed to Athenry's funding and expansion, as recorded in the priory's surviving register obtained by historian James Ware. Between 1241 and 1242, Feidlim Ua Conchobair, King of Connacht built the refectory, Owen Ó hEidhin, King of Uí Fiachrach Aidhne built the dormitory, and Conchobar Ó Cellaigh of Uí Maine the chapter house. Flann Mac Flainn, Archbishop of Tuam, built a house for scholars in the 1250s. In 1324, William Liath de Burgh left money to enlarge the church and priory, a task completed by 1345. Joanna de Ruffur died in 1408 and left money to construct a new east window and windows in the choir.

When Athenry Priory was burned in 1423,indulgences were granted by Pope Martin V and later Pope Eugene IV to those who contributed to its repair.

The monastery was dissolved in 1574. Athenry Abbey was burned during the uprising of William mac an Iarla Burke in the 1570s. Regular Observant Friars reoccupied it between 1595 and 1597.

Athenry was re-revived as a university in 1644, before being shut down by Cromwellians in 1652. During the Cromwellian conquest of Ireland, Athenry was badly damaged and a number of priory members were killed.

By 1698, the last remaining friars left Athenry for Esker Monastery.

In the 18th century the cloistral buildings were demolished by the English military to build a barracks. The English soldiers living at the site defaced the majority of tombs and carvings at the monastery before relocating to a new barracks in 1850.

The church served as a burial place for multiple bishops of Clonfert and Kilmacduagh, as well as several descendants of the de Bermingham family. Priory founder Meyler de Bermingham was buried at the site in 1252. His son William de Bermingham, Archbishop of Tuam, was buried at the priory in 1312, despite a reported dispute with the monastery in 1297. The last de Bermingham to be buried at Athenry was Lady Mathilda Bermingham (d. 1788). Lady Mathilda's tomb, a Coade stone monument, was broken into in 2002.

== Clerics Associated with Athenry Abbey ==
- Dominic de Burgo (Dominic Burke) OP, Bishop of Elphin, professed in Athenry in 1648
- Dominic Burke OP, returned to Athenry as Prior in 1642
- Edmund Bourke OP, priest and academic, processed in Athenry in 1683
- Thomas Burke OP, served as prior in San Sisto Rome, before serving as Prior in Athenry (1687-1698)
- William Burke OP, provincial of the order, served as Prior of Athenry
- Gerald Davok, STM OP, prior of Athenry 1663

== Buildings ==
The remains consist of nave, chancel and a northern aisle and transept, and tombs from the 13th–15th centuries.

The tall lancet windows in the chancel are probably 13th century while the remainder is 14th century.

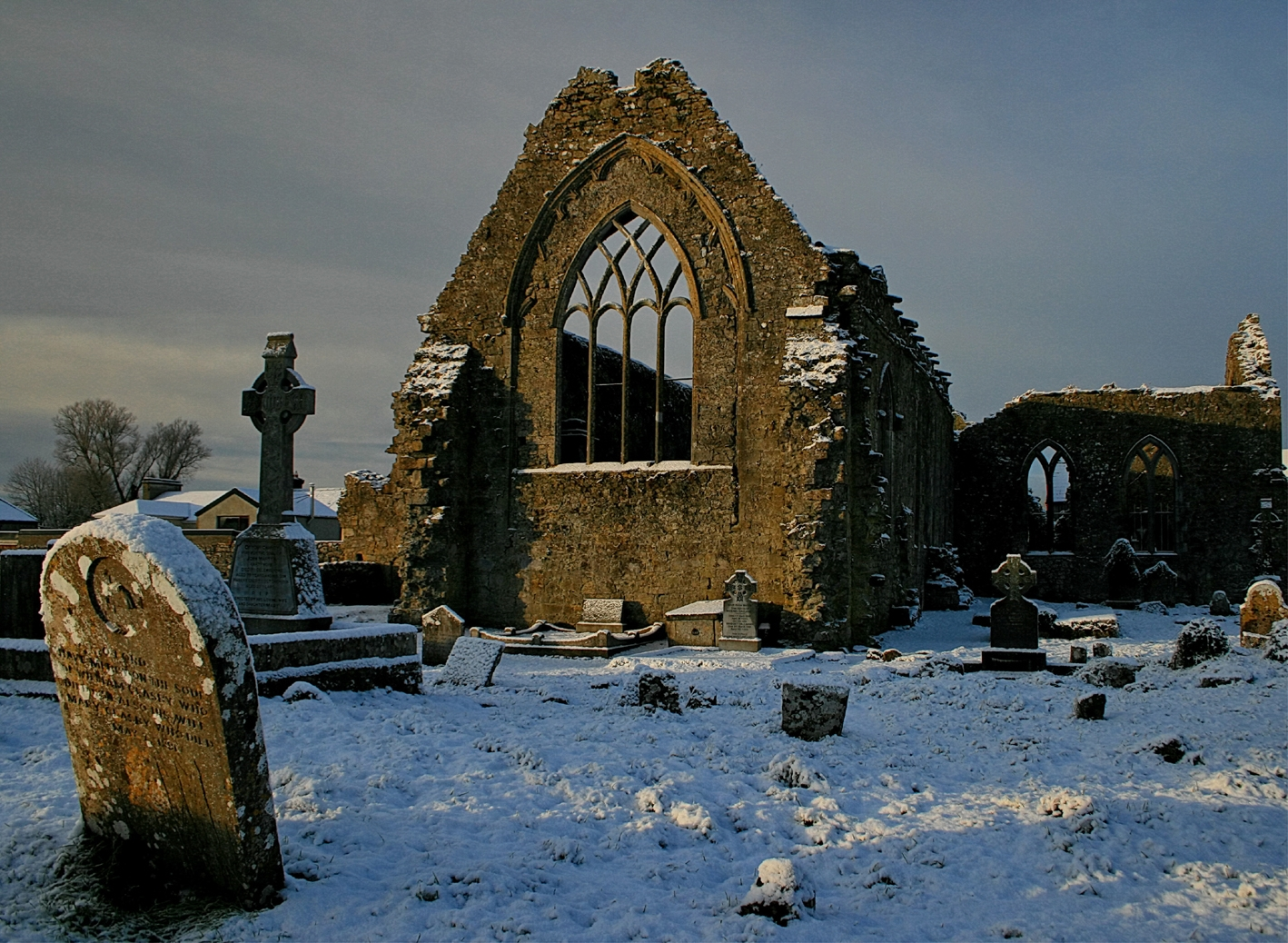
The abbey in winter

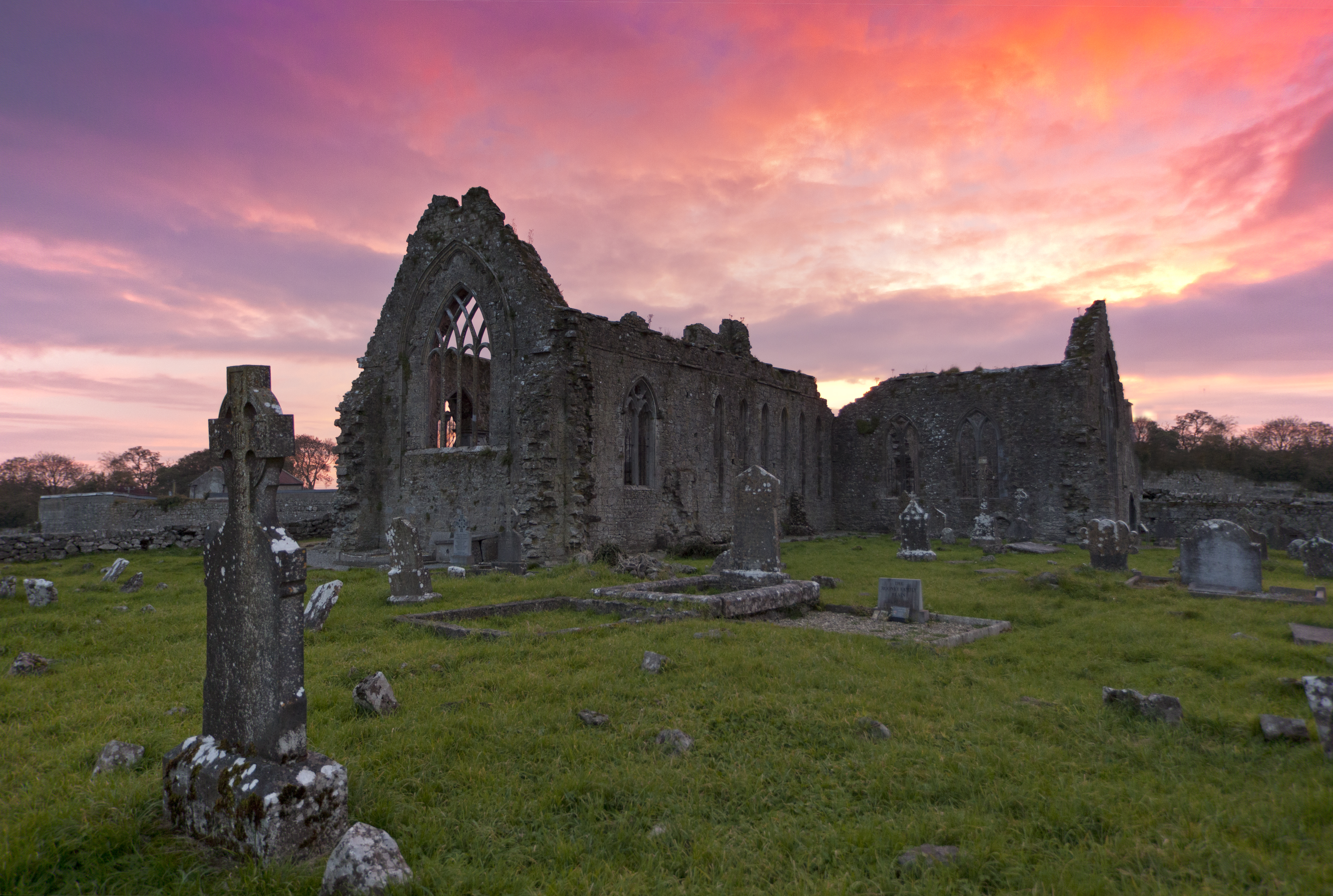
Sunset over the abbey church

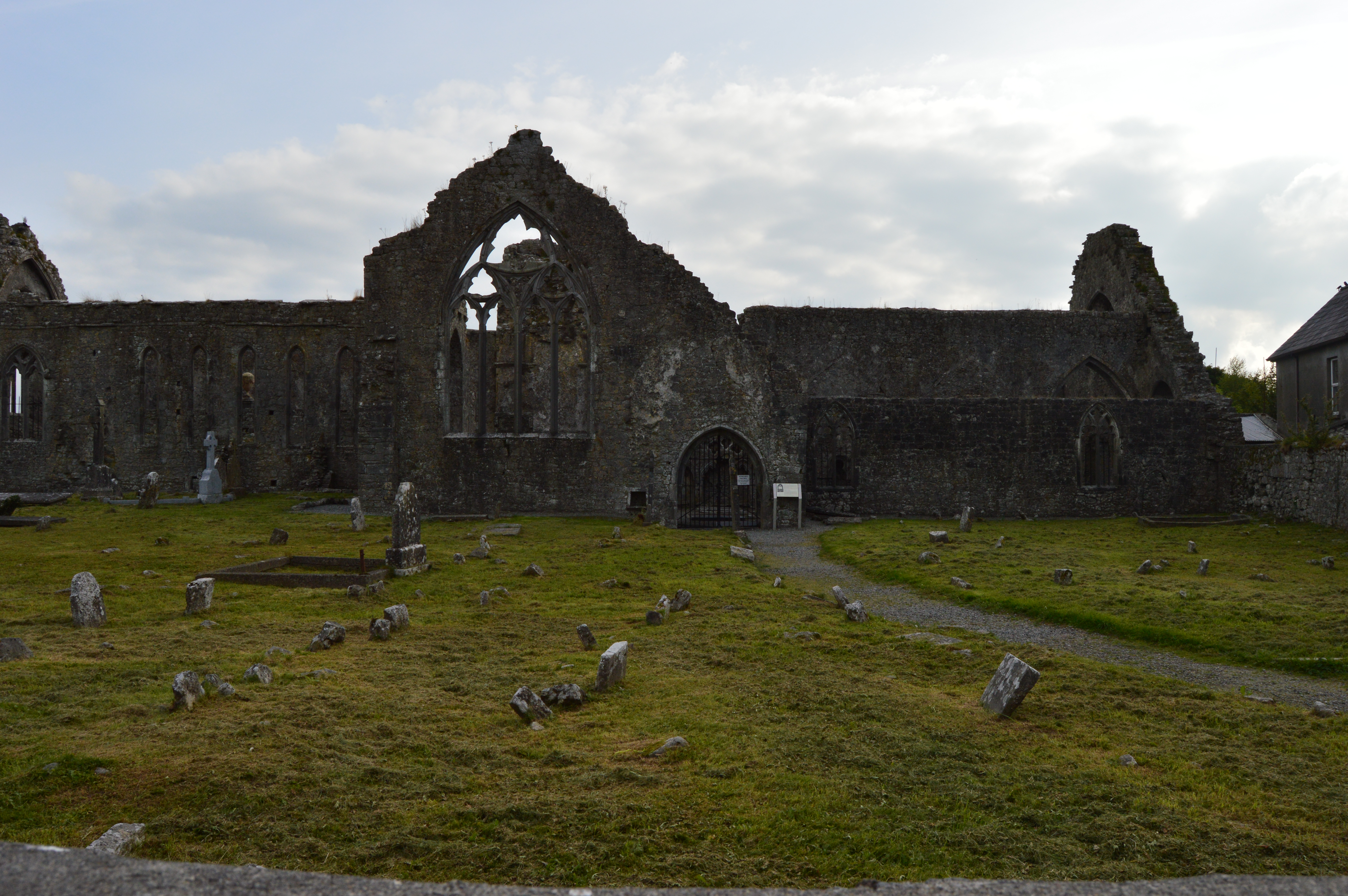
Another view
