= Seaán Ó Connmhaigh =

Irish abbot and bishop

Seaán Ó Connmhaigh was Abbot of Corcomroe and Bishop of Clonfert and Bishop of Kilmacduagh during 1419–1441.

Bishop Ó Connmhaigh was one of at least two bearers of the surname (now rendered as Conway to hold this office. He was preceded by an Énri Ó Connmhaigh (fl. 1405). An apparent kinsman, Máel Muire Ó Connaig, may have been a relative who bore an earlier version of the surname.

His immediate predecessor, Nicol Ó Duibhghiolla, had been appointed before October 1419 but never consecrated.

Ó Connmhaigh was appointed 23 October 1419; he had previously been abbot of the Cistercian Abbey of Corcomroe in the Burren. He died before May 1441. His successor, Dionysius Ó Donnchadha (died before December 1478), was an apparent relative of a previous bishop, Diamaid Ó Donnchadha (appointed about July 1418).

Preceded by Nicol Ó Duibhghiolla	Bishops of Kilmacduagh; 1419–1441	Succeeded by Dionysius Ó Donnchadha
