= Peatsaí Ó Callanáin =

Irish poet

Peatsaí Ó Callanáin (c. 1791–1865) was an Irish poet.

Younger brother of Marcas Ó Callanáin, Peatsaí is said to have been the better known of the two. He attended a local school in Craughwell, and later attended one or both the schools of Anthony O'Brien at Athenry, or of the (Dominican) Brothers at Esker, County Galway.

He was for a time a rival of Antoine Ó Raifteirí but they later became good friends.

In 1967, Seán Ó Ceallaigh - principal of Craughwell National School - produced an edition of their poems.
