= William Burke (prior) =

Irish Dominican cleric (c. 1611 – dead by 1685)

William Burke (c. 1611 – dead by 1685) was an Irish Dominican cleric who was Prior of Athenry.

Variously said to be a native of Athenry, Portumna or Turlough, County Mayo. He was a descendant of the House of Burgh, with the surname Burke being the gaelicised form of this surname (de Búrca or Búrc, originally de Burgh). Burke studied in Spain where he joined the Dominican Order. In September 1629, prior to ordination, he was assigned to the convent of Valencia, Spain. He taught at the University of Besançon but by 1646 had returned to Connacht as a professor of philosophy.

By 1648 he was a preacher general and prior of Strade, and in 1650 was Provincial. He was obliged to take refuge on Inisboffin, from where he sailed to Brest in April 1652 as a delegate to the Duke of Lorraine. After the fall of Galway, his political role made it morally impossible for him to return to Ireland before the Restoration, his provincialate was spent in exile. He spent 1653 in Paris and Brussels, before residing at Louvain for the years 1653-55. He was re-appointed Provincial on 13 June 1654. He would travel to Germany at least once.

By 1664, having resigned his office, and survived a preferment controversy for "favouring Connachtmen" at Louvain, Burke was again in Ireland, where he was Prior of Athenry Abbey. In 1667 he was again Prior of Strade. A document of c. 1671 lists him among a number of episcopal candidates.

== See also ==
- Dominic Burke
- Vincent Dillon
- Edmund Burke
- John O'Heyne

== Bibliography ==
- History of Galway, James Hardiman, 1820
- Old Galway, Maureen Donovan O'Sullivan, 1942
- Irish Dominicans at Lisbon before 1700: a Biographical Register, Hugh Fenning, in Collectanea Hibernica, pp. 27–65 volume 42, 2000
