= Nicol Ó Leaáin =

Nicol Ó Leaáin, Bishop of Kilmacduagh 1358–1393. Ó Leaáin (O'Leane, Lane, Linnane) is associated with the Oranmore-Clarenbridge are of County Galway.

Ó Leaáin was appointed 16 November 1358 and consecrated in 1360. He died before October 1393.

== See also ==
- Mauricius Ó Leaáin, Bishop of Kilmacduagh, 1254–1284.
- Gregorius Ó Leaáin, Bishop of Kilmacduagh, 1394–1397.
- Noel Lane (born 1954), retired Galway Gaelic Athletic Association (GAA) manager.
- Sylvie Linnane (born 1956) retired GAA sportsman.

Catholic Church titles
Preceded by Johannes	Bishops of Kilmacduagh; 1358–1393	Succeeded by Gregorius Ó Leaáin
