= Mac Gilla Cellaig Ua Ruaidín =

Mac Gilla Cellaig Ua Ruaidín (died 1204) was Bishop of Kilmacduagh.

Mac Gilla Cellaig Ua Ruaidín became Bishop sometime after the death of his predecessor, and apparent kinsman, Ímar Ua Ruaidín, in 1176.

His forename may indicate links to a local family, Mac Giolla Cheallaigh, who were a branch of the local Ui Fiachrach Aidhne dynasty. Like his predecessor, he died in office.

A later bishop bearing the surname was Gilla Cellaig Ó Ruaidín, 1248–53. In the early 20th-century, Tom Ruane of Carnmore was Captain of the Second Western Division, Irish Republican Army, from 1916 to 1920.

Ua Ruaidín (Ó Ruaidín, Rooane, Ruane, Rowan) was of one of two apparently unrelated families, based in what would become County Mayo and County Galway, respectively. The Galway family was of the Ui Maine. The Mayo family sometimes appears as Rowah. Both versions are found in both counties. Ó Ruadháin derives from first name Ruadhán, the red-haired one.

Preceded by Ímar Ua Ruaidín	Bishops of Kilmacduagh before 1179–1204	Succeeded by I. Ua Cellaig
