= Gregorius Ó Leaáin =

Nicol Ó Leaáin, Bishop of Kilmacduagh, from 1394 to 1397. Ó Leaáin (O'Leane, Lane, Linnane) is associated with the Oranmore-Clarenbridge area of County Galway.

Ó Leaáin was appointed 14 October 1393 and consecrated c. 1394; confirmed bishop 30 August 1396. He died 1397. The see remained vacant until the appointment of Énri Ó Connmhaigh, Bishop of Clonfert, in March 1405.

== See also ==
- Mauricius Ó Leaáin, Bishop of Kilmacduagh, 1254–1284.
- Nicol Ó Leaáin, Bishop of Kilmacduagh, 1358–1393.
- Noel Lane (born 1954), retired Galway Gaelic Athletic Association (GAA) manager.
- Sylvie Linnane (born 1956) retired GAA sportsman.

Catholic Church titles
Preceded by Nicol Ó Leaáin	Bishops of Kilmacduagh; 1394–1397	Succeeded by Énri Ó Connmhaigh
