= Oliver Burke (priest) =

Oliver Burke (c. 1598 – 1672) was a Dominican priest and ecclesiastical administrator, and Bishop of Kilmacduagh.

Burke was a native of Athenry, brother of Dominic Burke, John de Burgh (Archbishop), and Hugh Burke (Bishop of Kilmacduagh 1647–56) and grand-uncle to the Dominican historian, John O'Heyne. He studied at Burgos, and was a priest by 1627, being in that year an honours student at the Dominican College of St. Thomas in Rome. Tomas O Floinn relates that: "He was reputed to be well versed in history and prudent in business matters."

From 1629 to 1647, Burke was simultaneously vicar apostolic of Kilmacduagh and rector of Holy Cross College at Mont Cesar, Louvain (1634–36). In the 1640s he was vicar to his brother, John, Archbishop of Tuam. He also served as chaplain to the 5th Earl of Clanricarde, and the latter's envoy to the Confederation of Kilkenny. As a result of this role, he was one of a number of representatives of the clergy and nobility to draft an Irish constitution. He was in Galway in 1642, working as an intermediary between Patrick D'Arcy, Richard Martyn - representing the disaffected citizens of the town, and Clanricarde.

He and his family were opposed to Giovanni Battista Rinuccini, for which he faced censure. He departed from Galway in March 1651 as emissary to Innocent X, and spent much of the following ten years in France. He was in London after 1664, and returned to Ireland in the household of the new Earl of Clanricarde. He died in 1672, at a place unknown. O Floinn writes that: "His cosmopolitan career ... vision, initiatives and principal role have yet to be fully recovered and historically reappraised."
