= Mauricius Ó Leaáin =

Mauricius Ó Leaáin was Bishop of Kilmacduagh, Ireland, from 1254 to 1284. Ó Leaáin (O'Leane, Lane, Linnane) is associated with the Oranmore–Clarenbridge area of County Galway. He was the first of three men of the surname to become bishop of Kilmacduagh.

Ó Leaáin was elected before 15 May 1254 and received possession of the temporalities after that date. He died before 16 January 1284.

== See also ==
- Seoán Ó Leaáin, Bishop of Clonfert, 1322–1336.
- Nicol Ó Leaáin, Bishop of Kilmacduagh 1358–1393.
- Gregorius Ó Leaáin, Bishop of Kilmacduagh, 1394–1397.

Catholic Church titles
Preceded by Gilla Cellaig Ó Ruaidín	Bishops of Kilmacduagh before 1253-1284	Succeeded by David Ó Sétacháin
