= Thomas O'Connor =

Thomas O'Connor may refer to:

- Thomas O'Connor (bishop) (1755–1803), bishop of Achonry, County Sligo, Ireland
- Thomas O'Connor (writer) (1770–1855), Irishman who emigrated to New York where he was a journalist
- Thomas O'Connor (Wisconsin politician) (1815–1901), American politician and farmer
- Thomas O'Connor (rancher) (1819–1887), Texas cattle rancher and landowner originally from County Wexford, Ireland
- T. P. O'Connor (1848–1929), Irish nationalist, journalist, and politician
- Thomas V. O'Connor (1870–1935), Canadian-born American labor union leader
- Tommy O'Connor (criminal) (1880–1951), escaped Chicago convict
- Thomas Martin O'Connor (1913–1998), city attorney of San Francisco
- Thomas Burton O'Connor, (1914-1952), American journalist
- Tom O'Connor (Gaelic footballer) (1918–1997), Irish Gaelic footballer
- Thomas H. O'Connor (1923–2012), Boston historian
- Thomas J. O'Connor (1925–1996), mayor of Springfield, Massachusetts
- Thomas C. O'Connor (1927–2001), mayor of Norwalk, Connecticut, 1982–1983
- Tommy O'Connor (died 1987), Irish footballer
- Tom O'Connor (comedian) (1939–2021), English comedian
- Santa Claus (politician) (Thomas Patrick O'Connor, born 1947), American politician, North Pole, Alaska
- Tom O'Connor (American football) (born 1963), American football punter
- Tom O'Connor (priest) (born mid-late 20th century), Irish local historian
- Thomas O'Connor (footballer) (born 1999), Irish footballer
- Thomas O'Connor (cricketer) (born 2004), New Zealand cricketer

== See also ==
- Tomás O'Connor (disambiguation)
