= Énri Ó Connmhaigh =

Roman Catholic bishop

Énri Ó Connmhaigh (fl. 1405) was Bishop of Clonfert and Bishop of Kilmacduagh.

Bishop Ó Connmhaigh was one of at least two bearers of the surname (now rendered as Conway to hold this office. He was succeeded by a Seaán Ó Connmhaigh, who became bishop in 1441. An apparent kinsman, Máel Muire Ó Connaig, who held the office from may have been a relative who bore an earlier version of the surname.

Ó Connmhaigh, originally bishop of Clonfert, was translated from that diocese to Kilmacduagh on 11 March 1405. He succeeded Gregorius Ó Leaáin, whose office was vacant from his death in 1397 until Énri was appointed in 1405. He in turn was succeeded at some unknown date by Dionysius (died 1410).

== See also ==
- Catholic Church in Ireland

Catholic Church titles
Preceded by David Corre	Bishop of Clonfert; 1398–1405	Succeeded by Tomás mac Muircheartaigh; Ó Cellaigh

Catholic Church titles
Preceded by Gregorius Ó Leaáin	Bishop of Kilmacduagh; 1405-?	Succeeded by Dionysius
