= Maél Póil =

Maél Póil was an Irish abbot in c. the 9th-10th centuries.

In 1978 a graveslab was discovered at the church and graveyard of the townland of Templemoyle, Athenry, County Galway. It bore the inscription, in Irish, 'OROIT AR MAELPOIL' (a prayer for the devotee of Paul). A large bronze-coated iron handbell was also discovered. The graveslab, featuring a small incised cross, would have been placed in a recumbent position over a burial. According to an article by Joseph Mannion,

In all probability, the memorial was engraved in honour of an important ecclesiastic attached to Tech Saxan, more than likely one of its abbots. Dáibhí Ó Cróinín has remarked that even in ecclesiastical circles the name Maél Póil was extremely rare in the early period following the introduction of Christianity into Ireland. This trend appears to have changed somewhat over the centuries and research into the name by Etienne Rynne led him to believe that it was relatively common among clerics in the late ninth and tenth centuries.

== See also ==
- Téach
- Mayo Abbey
- Conainne
- Kerrill
