= Eugenius Ó Faoláin =

Bishop of Kilmacduagh

Eugenius Ó Faoláin was Bishop of Kilmacduagh during 1409–1418.

Appointed 23 September 1409 (papal bulls expediated 25 May 1410), he was translated to Killaloe on 6 July 1418.

His surname is anglicised as Whelan and Phelan. Though mainly found in Leinster and Munster, it is also native to Connacht.

== Bibliography ==
- The Surnames of Ireland, Edward MacLysaght, 1978.
- A New History of Ireland: Volume IX - Maps, Genealogies, Lists, ed. T.W. Moody, F.X. Martin, F.J. Byrne, pp. 322–324.

Preceded by Dionysius	Bishops of Kilmacduagh; 1418-1419	Succeeded by Diamaid Ó Donnchadha
