= Lúrint Ó Lachtnáin =

Lúrint Ó Lachtnáin (? – c. 1 March 1307), also known as Laurentius, was elected Bishop of Kilmacduagh before 10 August 1290 and received possession of the temporalities after that date. Prior to that he was Abbot of Knockmoy Abbey, near present-day Abbeyknockmoy, Ireland.

Preceded by David Ó Sétacháin	Bishops of Kilmacduagh; 1290–1307	Succeeded by Lucas
