= David Ó Sétacháin =

Irish bishop

David Ó Sétacháin (died 1290) was Bishop of Kilmacduagh.

David Ó Sétacháin was elected and received possession of the temporalities after 27 March 1284. He died before 13 June 1290.

== Bibliography ==
- The Surnames of Ireland, Edward MacLysaght, 1978, ISBN 978-0716523666

Catholic Church titles
Preceded by Mauricius Ó Leaáin	Bishops of Kilmacduagh; 1284-1290	Succeeded by Lúrint Ó Lachtnáin
