= Ímar Ua Ruaidín =

Ímar Ua Ruaidín (died 1176) was Bishop of Kilmacduagh.

Ua Ruaidín (Ó Ruaidín, Rooane, Ruane, Rowan) was of one of two apparently unrelated families, based in what would become County Mayo and County Galway, respectively. The Galway family was of the Ui Maine. The Mayo family sometimes appears as Rowah. Both versions are found in both counties.

Ímar became Bishop sometime after 1137, though the date is not known for certain. His predecessor may have been a Bishop Ua Clérig, a member of the local Ui Fiachrach Aidhne dynasty. Ímar died in 1176.

Ó Ruadháin derives from the first name Ruadhán, the red-haired one. His given name Ímar is the Gaelic for the Norse Ivar.

| Preceded by ?Ua Clérig | Bishops of Kilmacduagh unknown-1176 | Succeeded by Mac Gilla Cellaig Ua Ruaidín |
