= Peter Killikelly =

Irish Roman Catholic bishop

Peter Killikelly, OP (1703 - 1783) was an Irish Roman Catholic bishop and Bishop of Kilfenora in the 18th century.

Killikelly became Bishop of Kilmacduagh in 1744. In 1750 Pope Benedict XIV decreed that it to be united with the bishopric of Kilfenora. The bishop of the united dioceses was to be alternately. He died on 29 May 1783.
