= River Clarin =

River in County Galway, Ireland

Coordinates: 53.334919°N 8.608877°W

River Clarin River Clareen, Clarinbridge River, Clarin River
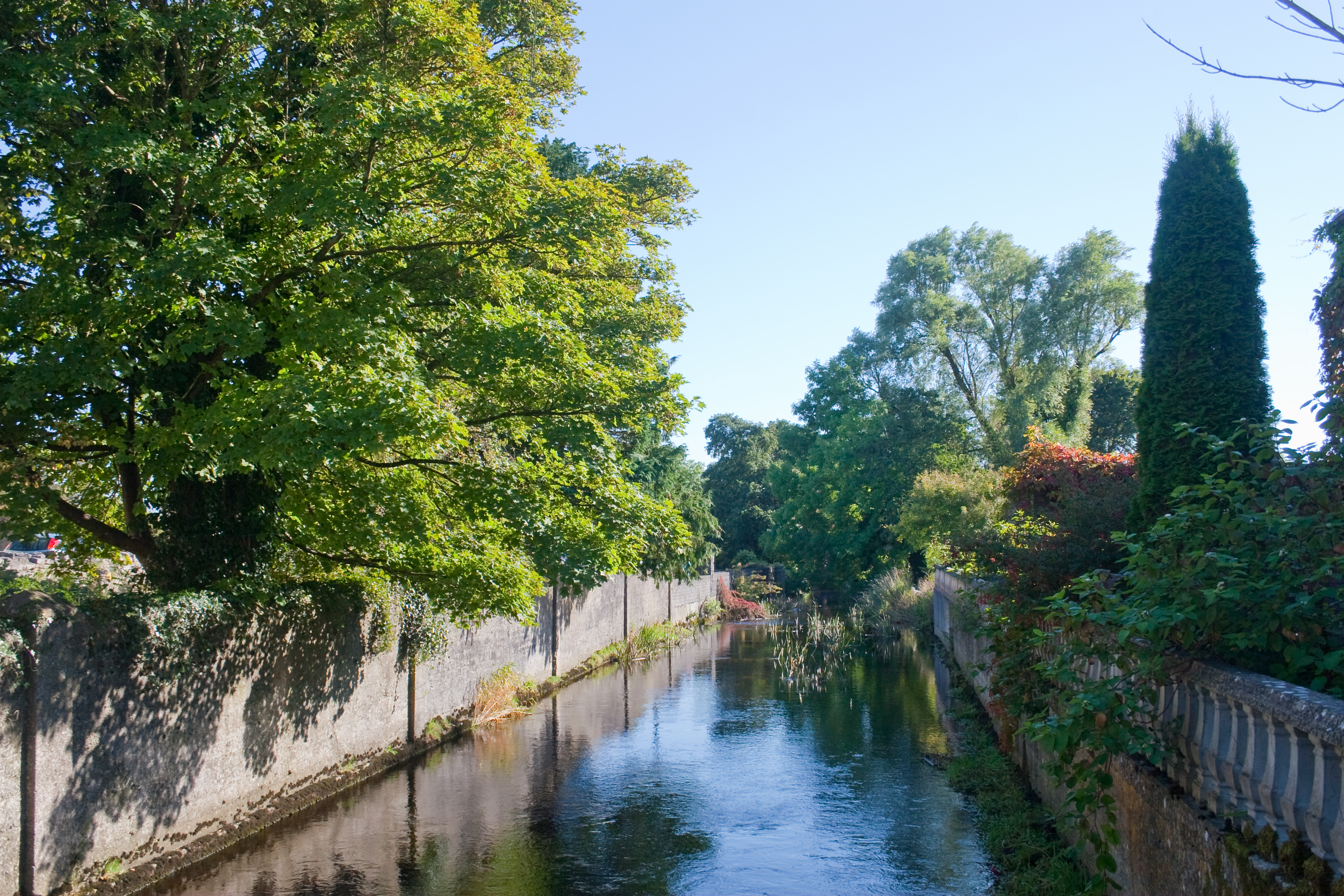
- River Clarin in Athenry
- Etymology: river of the little plain / flat board
- Native name: Abhainn an Chláirín (Irish)

Physical characteristics
- Source
  - location: Central County Galway
- Mouth
  - location: Galway Bay via Dunbulcaun Bay
- Length: 31.78 km (19.75 mi)
- Basin size: 123 square kilometres (47 sq mi)
- Discharge
  - average: 1.45 m^{3}/s (51 cu ft/s)

The River Clarin (Irish: Abhainn an Chláirín) is a fast-flowing river in Ireland, flowing through southern County Galway.

== Course ==
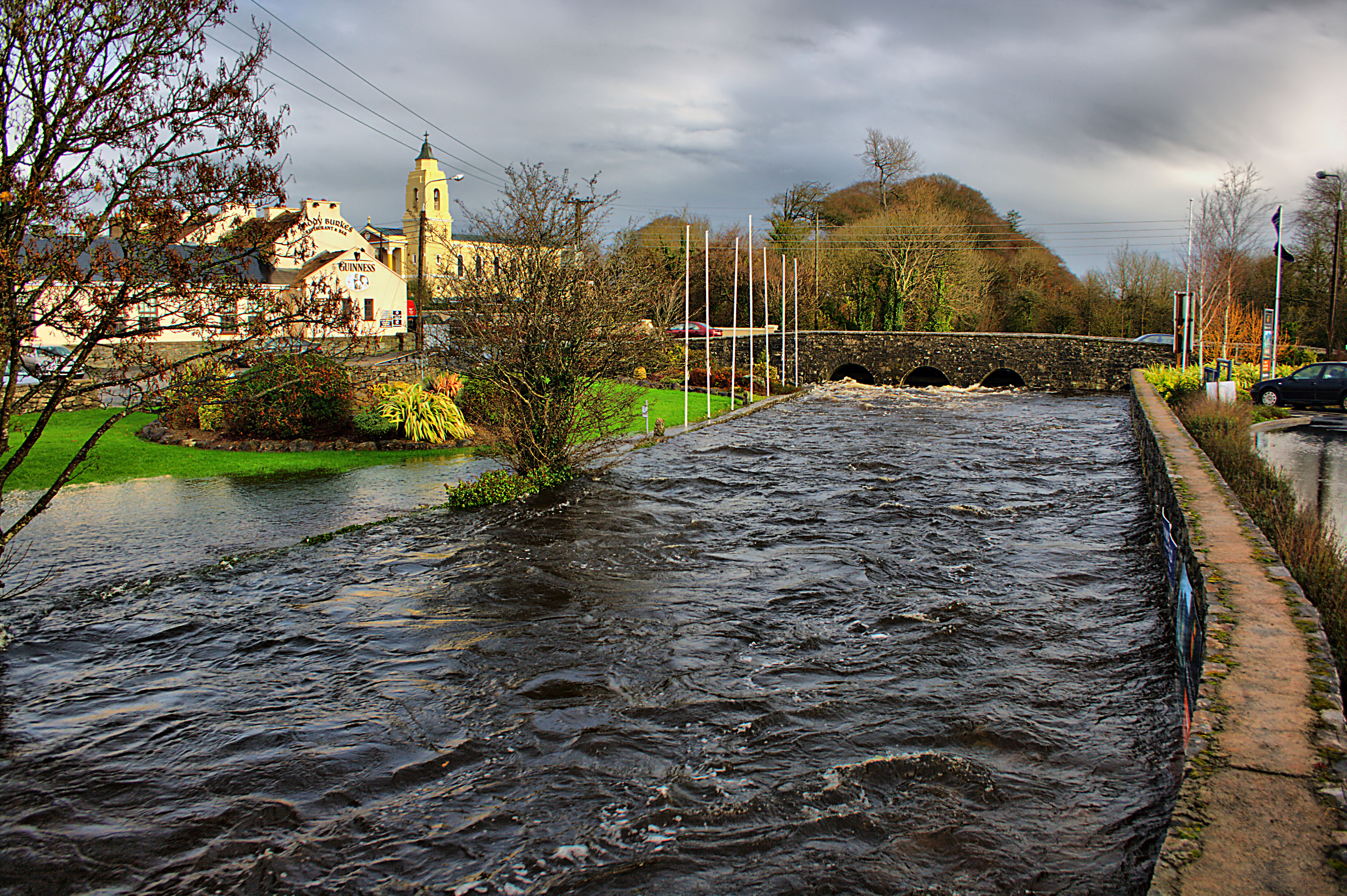
The Clarin River bursts its banks in Clarinbridge

The River Clarin rises in the townland of Gortnalone, north of Attymon and snakes westwards, turning southwards through Athenry. Athenry Castle was built at a fording point on the river. It flows southwestwards and passes under the N18 at Clarinbridge and enters Dunbulcaun Bay.

== Wildlife ==
Fish species include Crayfish, trout, salmon, lamprey and eel.

== See also ==
- Rivers of Ireland
