= James Patrick Brodrick =

Historical Irish Jesuit writer

James Patrick Brodrick SJ (26 July 1891 in Kingsland, Athenry – 26 August 1973) was an Irish Jesuit and writer.

Brodrick was educated in Dublin and Stonyhurst. He joined the Jesuits in February 1910 at Manresa, London, and was ordained in 1923. Most of his working life was spent at Farm Street in London. He graduated MA from the University of London and was a contributor to periodicals such as The Tablet and The Month.

Brodrick published several books. Most of his career as a writer was almost exclusively dedicated to writing Jesuit history. His primary interest was the early history of the Society of Jesus. The first work to come from his pen was his two-volume biography of the Jesuit Cardinal Robert Bellarmine. In 1935 there followed his biography of St. Peter Canisius. Both works were considered major achievements and his success resides in that his work is not one of adulation and hero worship.

== Bibliography ==
- The life and work of Robert Cardinal Bellarmine, i, ii, Burns, Oates & Washbourne, 1928.
- St. Peter Canisius:a study of the Catholic reformation, Sheed & Ward, 1935.
- Brodrick, Rev. James Patrick (1940). The Origin of the Jesuits. Originally Published Longmans Green. ISBN 0829409300.
- The progress of the Jesuits, 1556-79, Longmans Green, 1946
- St. Francis Xavier, Burns, Oates & Washbourne, 1956
- St. Ignatius of Loyola. The Pilgrim Years 1491-1538, Farrar, Straus and Cudahy, 1956
- Robert Bellarmine, Saint and Scholar, Burns & Oates, 1961
- Galileo, 1964
