= Dionysius Ó Donnchadha =

Irish Roman Catholic bishop

Dionysius Ó Donnchadha was an Irish Roman Catholic bishop who served as the Bishop of Kilmacduagh from 1441 to 1478.

Nothing appears to be known of this bishop's term. A Diarmaid Ó Donnchadha became bishop of the same diocese in 1418.

== Bibliography ==
- The Surnames of Ireland, Edward MacLysaght, 1978, ASIN: B01A0CGA4W
- A New History of Ireland: Volume IX – Maps, Genealogies, Lists, ed. T. W. Moody, F. X. Martin, F. J. Byrne, pp. 322–324, Oxford University Press; 2011, ISBN 978-0199593064.

Preceded by Seaán Ó Connmhaigh	Bishops of Kilmacduagh; 1441–1478	Succeeded by Cornelius Ó Mullony
