= Athenry Castle =

13th century tower house in County Galway, Ireland

- Caisleán Bhaile Átha an Rí (Irish)
- King John's Court; Bermingham's Court
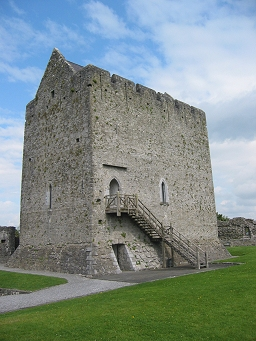

- Location within Ireland
- 53.299990°N 8.744619°W
- Type: Tower house
- Location: Court Lane, Athenry, County Galway, Ireland

History
- Built: c. 1235–50

Site notes
- Owner: State

National monument of Ireland
- Official name: Athenry Castle
- Reference no.: 406

Athenry Castle is a tower house and National Monument located in Athenry, Ireland.

== Location ==
Athenry Castle is located off Court Lane in the eastern part of Athenry, on the west bank of the River Clarin. It is sited on a natural rise and defended a ford in the river.

== History ==
Despite being locally known as King John's Castle or King John's Court (after the Lord of Ireland 1177–1216), it wasn't built until twenty years after his reign.

The original keep (constructed 1235/40) was low and squat, the roof being at the level of the present second floor. Meyler de Bermingham extended it c. 1250. In 1316 the castle was attacked, leading to the construction of city walls. In the 15th century the Berminghams moved from it to their town house near the market cross in the square. In 1596 (during the Nine Years' War) the castle fell into the hands of the O'Donnells.

The battlements are 13th century and in the 15th century, these parapets were incorporated into gables for a new roof.

The castle was restored in 2005.

== Building ==
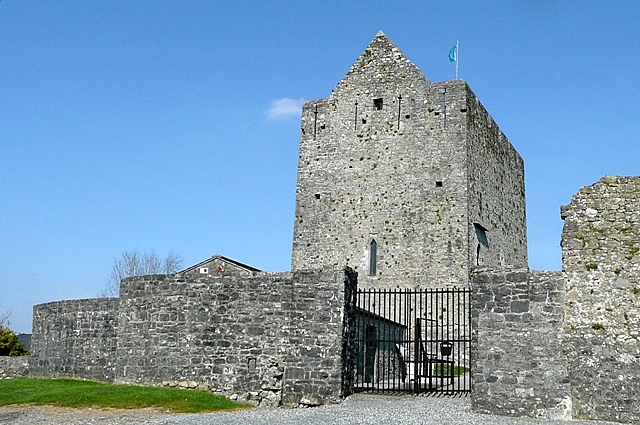
Another view

Athenry Castle is a large rectangular building with base-batter, originally containing only a hall on the upper level and storerooms at ground level. The battlements are 13th century with tall arrowslits in the merlons. In the 15th century, these parapets were incorporated into gables at the north and south ends for a new roof. Parts of the original enclosure wall of the castle survive.

The original entrance was at first-floor level and was reached by an external wooden stairs. Heat was probably provided by a brazier in the centre of the hall, with the smoke exiting through a louver or opening in the roof directly above. The garderobe is diagonally across from the main entrance.

There is fine carving on the exterior of the doorway and on the inner side of two of the window openings. The capitals are carved with floral motifs in a local style, known as the "School of the West", transitional between Romanesque and Late Gothic.

A mural staircase led to the top floor. Wall-towers were built at the northeast and southeast corners, while the southwestern corner was fortified by the gate.

== In fiction ==
The castle features in the 2005 children's historical novel: Hoofbeats: Lara at Athenry Castle by Kathleen Duey.
