= Roland Lynch =

Irish Anglican bishop

Styles of Roland Lynch
- Reference style: The Right Reverend
- Spoken style: My Lord or Bishop

Roland Lynch (died 1625) was Anglican clergyman who served in the Church of Ireland as the Bishop of Kilmacduagh from 1587 to 1625.

A native of Galway, he was the Archdeacon of Clonfert when nominated to the bishopric of Kilmacduagh by Queen Elizabeth I on 9 January 1587. He was appointed to the see by letters patent on 14 June and consecrated to the Episcopate in August 1587. Fifteen years later, he was granted in commendam the bishopric of Clonfert on 14 February 1602. It was said that he impaired the revenues of both sees by granting improper leases. He died in office at Loughrea in December 1625.

== Bibliography ==
- Cotton, Henry (1849). The Province of Ulster. Fasti Ecclesiae Hiberniae: The Succession of the Prelates and Members of the Cathedral Bodies of Ireland. Vol. 3. Dublin: Hodges and Smith.
- Fryde, E. B.; Greenway, D. E.; Porter, S.; Roy, I., eds. (1986). Handbook of British Chronology (3rd, reprinted 2003 ed.). Cambridge: Cambridge University Press. ISBN 0-521-56350-X.
