= Liam Deois =

Liam Deois (a.k.a. Liam Joyce), fl. early 19th century, was a highwayman who lived at Gleann'a Ghadaí (valley of the robbers), Ballybackagh, some four miles northwest of Athenry, County Galway, Ireland. Locally described as a big man and feared by his neighbours, Deois robbed people going to and from the Galway market, usually in the area between Cúinne Geal - near what is now Carnmore Airport - to Cussaun Cross on the Galway-Monivea road. He would escape pursuit at his hideout at a place now known as Poll Liam Deois. During the summer months, he targeted people on the road from Merlin Park to Renmore, just outside Galway.

Deois was finally captured at the Cúinne Geal in the following circumstances:

"A man and his son were on their way from Galway after selling a cart of hay. Joyce, knowing they had the price of the hay, attacked, but they put up a great struggle. The father, who didn't want to part with his money, grappled with Joyce and succeeded in getting him around to the rear of the horse cart. The son then hit him on the head with a loaded butt. A loaded butt was a leadfilled stick used at that time in faction fighting. While he was still stunned they tied him with the hay ropes (Súgán) which were normally tied around the shafts at the back of the cart. They then dragged him after the cart to Oranmore police station."

His fate is unknown. Antoine Ó Raifteirí mentioned Casán Liam Deois in a poem about the musician Tomás Daly of nearby Coshla.
