= Tomás O'Connor =

Tomás O'Connor may refer to:

- Tomás O'Connor (Gaelic footballer) (born 1955), Irish Gaelic footballer
- Tomás O'Connor (footballer) (born 2004), Argentine association footballer

== See also ==
- Thomas O'Connor (disambiguation)
