= Nicol Ó Duibhghiolla =

Nicol Ó Duibhghiolla was Bishop of Kilmacduagh in 1419.

Nicol Ó Duibhghiolla was appointed bishop before October 1419, replacing the late Diamaid Ó Donnchadha (appointed about July 1418), but never consecrated. The see was instead held from 23 October 1419 by Seaán Ó Connmhaigh.

Catholic Church titles
Preceded by Diamaid Ó Donnchadha	Bishops of Kilmacduagh; 1419-1419	Succeeded by Seaán Ó Connmhaigh
