= Conchobar Ó Muirdaig =

Irish bishop

Conchobar Ó Muirdaig (died 1247) was Bishop of Kilmacduagh.

Ó Muirdaig's surname is a common one in Ireland, variantly written as Ó Muireachaidh. The most prominent Connacht family of the name were natives of the kingdom Uí Maine (now east County Galway and south County Roscommon). The surname is now generally anglicised as Murray.

The Annals of the Four Masters, sub anno 1246, reads "Turlough, the son of Hugh O'Conor, made his escape from the Crannog wooden house of Lough Leisi in Autumn, having drowned his keepers, namely, Cormac O'Murray, and the two O'Ainmireachs. He was again taken while under the protection of the Bishop of Cluain Clonfert, and, being given up into the hands of the English, was confined in the castle of Athlone."

An extract from the same annals, dated 1484, reads "Teige, the son of William, son of Hugh, son of Brian O'Kelly, was slain by Brian O'Kelly, his own brother, and William O'Murray, his own foster-brother, who were afterwards hanged by O'Kelly for their misdeeds."

Bishop Ó Muirdaig's term witnessed the invasion and encastellation of Connacht begin under Richard Mor de Burgh (c. 1194–1242) and the collapse of the Ó Conchobair kingship.

Preceded by Áed of Kilmacduagh	Bishops of Kilmacduagh ?-1247	Succeeded by Gilla Cellaig Ó Ruaidín
