= Gilla Cellaig Ó Ruaidín =

Gilla Cellaig Ó Ruaidín, a.k.a. Gilbert Ó Ruane, Bishop of Kilmacduagh, died 1204.

Ó Ruaidín (Rooane, Ruane, Rowan) was the third member of his family to serve as Bishop of Kilmacduagh, and the last. His family was one of two apparently unrelated families, based in what would become County Mayo and County Galway, respectively. The Galway family was of the Ui Maine.

He was elected before 5 May 1248 and received possession of the temporalities after that date. He died before 10 November 1253. He was also known as Gillebertus or Gilbert, a Latinisation of his forename.

== See also ==
- Tom Ruane

Catholic Church titles
Preceded by Conchobar Ó Muirdaig	Bishops of Kilmacduagh before 1248-1253	Succeeded by Mauricius Ó Leaáin
