= Edmund Bourke =

Irish preacher and writer

Edmund Bourke(Burke) STM, OP, (died 1738) was an Irish Dominican.

Born in Galway during the second half of the 17th century, joining the Order of Preachers where in 1683 he professed in Athenry, in that county where he began his studies before leaving for Spain where he completed his studies in Pamplona and at Our Lady of Atocha, Madrid. He is noted as the author of numerous scholarly works, though none of them have been traced. In 1706 he was principal regent of the Irish Dominican school in Louvain. He was called to rome in 1729. He died in Rome on May 23, 1739.

Edmund was the uncle of Thomas Burke OP, the dominican writer, who served as Bishop of Ossory.

== See also ==
- Dominicans in Ireland
