= Tom O'Connor (priest) =

Irish local historian and priest (fl. 20th/21st century

Tom O'Connor (1936–2024) was an Irish local historian.

A native of Kiltullagh near Athenry in County Galway, O'Connor spent almost 50 years researching the history and geopolitics of Iron Age Ireland, including early Connacht. His books, Turoe & Athenry: Ancient Capitals of Celtic Ireland and Hand of History, Burden of Pseudo-History, present a Celtic royal complex, unprecedented in Ireland for its size and layout, but similar to Belgic centres of power, centered on Turoe in County Galway, site of the Turoe stone. According to O'Connor the stone, a notable example of La Tene Celtic stone art, is part of a previously unrecognised royal sanctuary at the core of a Belgic-like oppidum defensive system of linear embankments, connected with the supposed Celtic invasion of Ireland.

O'Connor spent over thirty years as a missionary priest in Malaysia. He returned to Ireland in 2015 and died in 2024.

== Works ==
- O'Connor, Tom; Jordan, Kieran (2003). "Archaeological Sites of Interest surrounding the Turoe Stone". Journal of the Galway Archaeological and Historical Society. 55. Galway Archaeological and Historical Society: 110–116.
- O'Connor, Tom; Jordan, Kieran (2003). Turoe & Athenry: Ancient Capitals of Celtic Ireland. Tom O'Connor. ISBN 0-9544875-0-8.
- O'Connor, Tom (2006). Hand of History - Burden of Pseudo-History: Touchstone of Truth. Trafford Publishing. ISBN 1-4120-3458-2.
- O'Connor, Tom (2023). Tara's Exposé: Celtic Europe's Sunset and Ireland's Celtic Dawn. Austin Macauley Publishers. ISBN 9781035820221.

== See also ==
- Celtic Ireland
