= Diarmaid Ó Donnchadha =

Diarmaid Ó Donnchadha, Bishop of Kilmacduagh, fl. 1418.

Appointed and consecrated c. July 1418, Ó Donnchadha had died before October 1419. A Dionysius Ó Donnchadha became bishop from 1441 to 1478.

Preceded by Eugenius Ó Faoláin	Bishops of Kilmacduagh; 1418-1419	Succeeded by Nicol Ó Duibhghiolla
