= Dominic Burke (Dominican) =

Dominic Burke (c. 1603 – 1649) was an Irish Dominican priest and political agent.

== Biography ==
Burke appears to have been a native of Athenry; he is documented as a member of the Dominican Abbey of the town, after which he studied at Bologna. From 1628, he was a collegial student in Rome where, after graduate studies, he became lector of theology and confessor. Burke was fluent in Irish, English, Latin and Italian.

He was proposed in 1633 by Ridolfi for the Scottish mission but remained in Rome as procurator of the Irish Dominican province, which he held until 1639, succeeding his brother, Oliver Burke. Between 1638 and 1640, he was proposed for the sees of Clonfert, Kilalla and Achonry but not appointed to any of them. In 1639, he was in London to carry out an arbitration in a dispute between English Dominicans, meriting praise from Carlo Rossetti, the Papal Representative. He was by then patronised by the Earl of Clanricarde and the Marchioness of Winchester, who had recommended him for a see.

He returned to Athenry in 1642 as its prior, instigating a programme of theological studies and was responsible for the repair of the priory church, thanks to the support of the Earl of Clanricarde.

Burke and his brother Oliver both served as chaplain and adviser to Clanricarde, and only left his household at the threat of severe censure from Dominic Nugent, the provincial. They left his manor at Portumna before 15 September 1642. Despite this, he was employed by Clanricarde as his agent to the Irish Confederates in Kilkenny, dealing directly with the Supreme Council.

Burke was a resolute opponent of Giovanni Battista Rinuccini during the later part of the Irish Confederate Wars, signing the Ormond Peace in 1646. However, he repented of this in the last months of his life.

He was a great-uncle of John O'Heyne, who described him as "serious, pious and [of] prudent disposition." Thomas O Floinn writes that

"By his continental priestly training in an international religious order, in common with several other interrelated Dominicans of the Upper Mac William Burkes and Dominicans from other leading Connacht families, he was a man of integrity and truth, well fitted for Dominican ministry, diplomacy, oratory, administration, and a prominent role in the affairs of troubled mid-seventeenth century Ireland."
