= Máel Muire Ó Connaig =

Máel Muire Ó Connaig, Bishop of Kilmacduagh, died 1224.

Máel Muire Ó Connaig may have been the first of a number of a number of members of the same family who occupied the see. Énri Ó Connmhaigh (fl. 1405) and Seaán Ó Connmhaigh (1441–78) may bear later forms of a surname that is now rendered as Conway.

Bishop Ó Connaig predecessor, Ua Cellaig, died sometime in 1215 but it is not known when he himself was appointed or consecrated. He died in 1224.

Preceded by I. Ua Cellaig	Bishops of Kilmacduagh unknown-1224	Succeeded by Áed
