= Marcas Ó Callanáin =

Irish poet

Marcas Ó Callanáin (1789–1846) was an Irish poet. He was born at Carheendiveane, Craughwell, County Galway, Ireland and was the elder brother of Peatsaí, also a poet. Educated at the local school, he could speak Irish and English. His most well-known work is the love poem, Máire Brún.

In 1967, Seán Ó Ceallaigh - principal of Craughwell National School - produced an edition of their poems.

== Sources ==
- Filíocht na gCeannanáin, Seán Ó Ceallaigh, Baile Átha Cliath, An Clóchomhar, 1967.
- Galway Authors, Helen Maher, 1976.
