= John O'Heyne =

Irish historian

John O'Heyne (ca. 1648 – 11 December 1713) was an Irish Dominican and historian.

== Biography ==
O'Heyne was born near Athenry about 1648. His paternal grand-uncle was Dominic Burke, O.P., who opposed the Papal Nuncio, Giovanni Battista Rinuccini. His maternal grand-uncle was John de Burgo, Archbishop of Tuam, and Hugh Burke, Bishop of Kilmacduagh (1647 – ca. 1656).

O'Heyne received the habit at Athenry on 4 August 1664 and left for Spain in 1667. He studied at Burgos and Salamanca, graduating in 1675.

Upon his return to Ireland he became preacher and master of novices at Drogheda, where he became acquainted with Oliver Plunkett. He returned to Athenry, teaching at the hidden Dominican school at Kilescall until a new persecution arose in 1679, forcing the Dominicans to flee. O'Heyne went to Italy and Louvain. He was a candidate for bishop of Clonfert and Kilmacduagh in 1684 but was not selected.

Returning to Ireland in 1689 he was appointed Prior of Urlaur Abbey, Co. Mayo. By 1695 he was back at Athenry and spent April to June 1698 at Galway. However, he was again forced into exile and died at Louvain in 1713.

James Hardiman called him "a learned and ingenious historian" on account of his works on Irish Dominican history.

== Bibliography ==
- Epilogus chronologicus exponens ... Conventus et Fundationes Sacri Ordinis Praedicatorum in Regus Hybernie, Louvanaii, 1706.
- The Irish Dominicans of the XVII century, first published in 1706 in Louvain and reprinted, Dublin, 1902.

== See also ==
- Garry Hynes – co-founder of Druid Theatre Company and Tony Award winner
- Eidhean mac Cléireach – ancestor of the Hynes family
- Mael Ruanaidh na Paidre Ua hEidhin – first Hynes king of Aidhne
- Eoghan Ó hEidhin – last Hynes king of Aidhne
- Uí Fiachrach Aidhne – home kingdom of the Hynes family
