= Clarinbridge =

Village in County Galway, Ireland

Clarinbridge Droichead an Chláirín
- Village
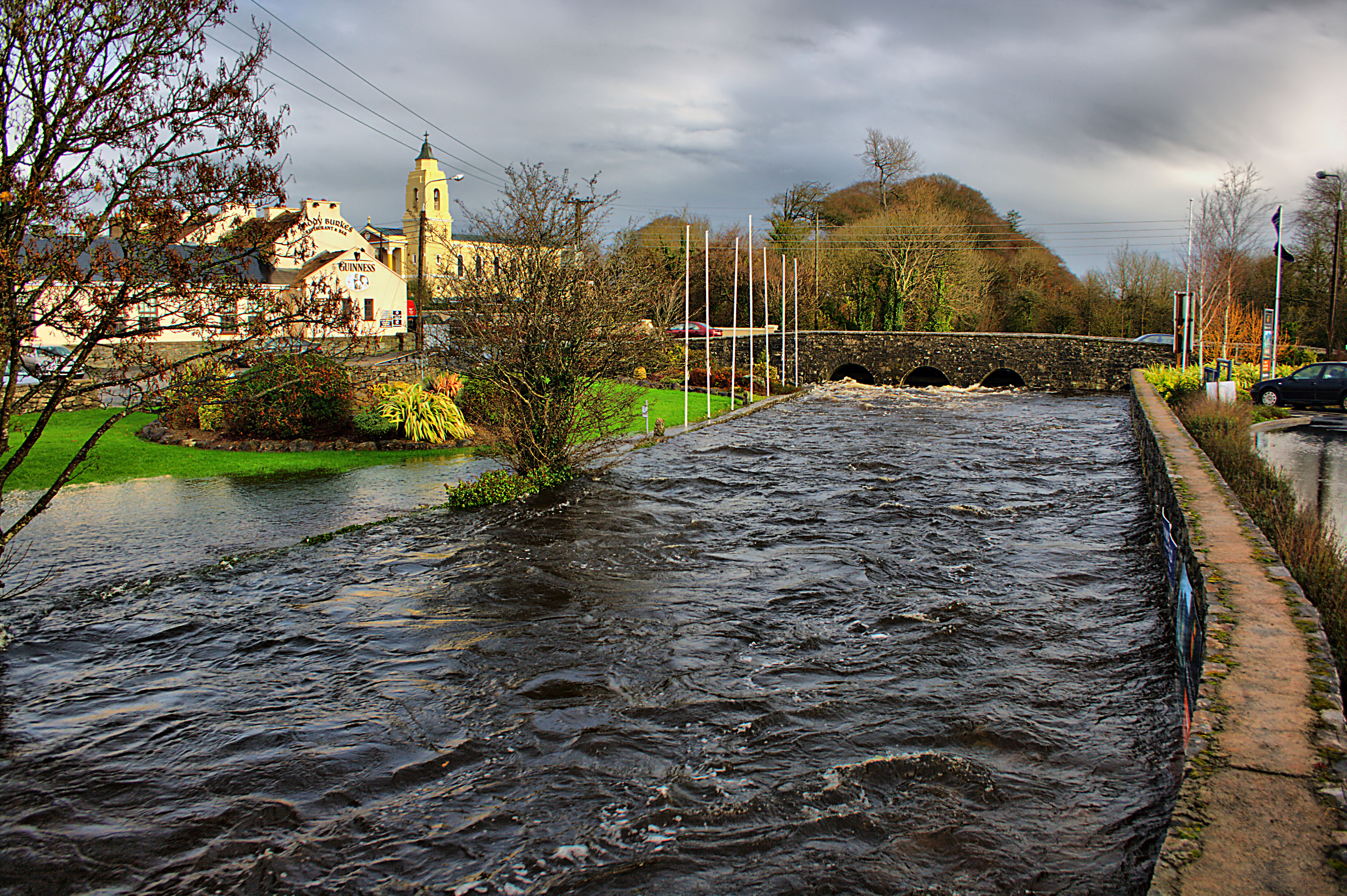
- River Clarin

- Location in Ireland
- Coordinates: 53°13′46″N 8°52′42″W
- Country: Ireland
- Province: Connacht
- County: County Galway
- Elevation: 5 m (16 ft)

Population (2022)
  - Total: 905
- Time zone: UTC+0 (WET)
  - Summer (DST): UTC-1 (IST (WEST))
- Irish Grid Reference: M409203

Clarinbridge or Clarenbridge (Irish: Droichead an Chláirín) is a village in south County Galway, Ireland. It is on the mouth of the Clarin River at the end of Dunbulcaun Bay, which is the easternmost part of Galway Bay.

Clarinbridge was formerly known as Áth-cliath-Meadhraidhe, i.e. the Ford of Hurdles of Maaree, which is the name of the peninsula running into Galway bay to the west of the village. In medieval Ireland this place marked the western terminus of the Esker Riada, which separated the northern from the southern half of Ireland, the eastern terminus being Áth-cliath-Cualann, or Dublin. These two places also marked the ends of one of the Five Great Roads of medieval Ireland, the Slige Mhór.

The village is 13 km south-east of Galway city centre (18 km by road). There are bus services, notably Bus Éireann's route 51 which runs between Galway, Limerick and Cork.

== Notable people ==
- Alexander Young, recipient of the Victoria Cross

== See also ==
- Galway International Oyster Festival
