= Sylvie Linnane =

Irish hurler

Sylvester (Sylvie) Linnane
Personal information
- Native name: Sailbheastar Ó Líonnáin (Irish)
- Born: 29 December 1956 (age 69) Gort, County Galway, Ireland
- Occupation: Farmer
- Height: 5 ft 7 in (170 cm)

Sport
- Sport: Hurling
- Position: Right corner-back
Club
- Years: Club
- Gort
Club titles
- Galway titles: 2
- Connacht titles: 2
- All-Ireland Titles: 3
Inter-county*
Years	County	Apps (scores)
1976–1989	Galway	28 (0-00)
Inter-county titles
- All-Irelands: 3
- NHL: 2
- All Stars: 3
- *Inter County team apps and scores correct as of 22:33, 30 January 2014.

Sylvester Linnane (born 29 December 1956) is an Irish retired 3 time All-Star winning hurler who played as a right corner-back for the Galway senior team.

Born in Gort, County Galway, Linnane first arrived on the inter-county scene at the age of sixteen when he first linked up with the Galway minor team, before later joining the under-21 team. He made his senior debut during the 1976 championship. Linnane went on to play a key role for Galway for over a decade, and won three All-Ireland medals and two National Hurling League medals. He was an All-Ireland runner-up on four occasions.

As a member of the Connacht inter-provincial team, Linnane won four Railway Cup medals. At club level he is a two-time Connacht medallist with Gort. In addition to this he also won two championship medals.

Throughout his career Linnane made 28 championship appearances for Galway. His retirement came following the conclusion of the 1989 championship.

Linnane is widely regarded as one of Galway's greatest-ever hurlers. He has often been voted onto teams made up of the sport's greats, including at right corner-back on the Galway Hurling Team of the Millennium.

== Playing career ==
=== Club ===
In 1981 Linnane was a key member of the Gort senior team, as they qualified for their first championship decider in over thirty years. Kiltormer provided the opposition, however, the game ended in a draw. The replay was more conclusive with Gort recording a 2–6 to 0–8 victory and a first championship medal for Linnane. He later added a Connacht medal to his collection as Gort completely overpowered Tooreen by 8–13 to 0–3.

After surrendering their championship crowns the following year, Gort were back in 1983. A 2–12 to 3–6 defeat of club kingpins Castlegar gave Linnane a second championship medal. He later added a second Connacht medal to his collection following a 3–13 to 1–5 defeat of Tooreen once again. Linnane later lined out against Ballyhale Shamrocks in the All-Ireland decider. A 59th minute Dermot Fennelly goal for Ballyhale secured a 1–10 apiece draw. The replay was more conclusive, with Ger Fennelly's first-half goal leading to a 1–10 to 0–7 defeat of Linnane's side.

=== Inter-county ===
Linnane first came to prominence on the inter-county scene with the Galway at under-age levels. At minor level he lined out in the All-Ireland final of 1973, however, Kilkenny were victorious on that occasion. Linnane later played with the Galway under-21 team, however, he had little success in this grade.

Linnane made his senior championship debut for Galway in a 3–12 to 3–9 All-Ireland quarter-final defeat of Kerry.

In 1979 Galway shocked four-in-a-row hopefuls Cork in the All-Ireland semi-final and qualified for an All-Ireland final showdown with Kilkenny. In one of the worst All-Ireland finals of the decade, Tipperary-born Galway goalkeeper Séamus Shinnors had an absolute nightmare of a game. A 70-yards free by Liam "Chunky" O'Brien after just four minutes dipped, hit off Shinnors and ended up in the Galway net. Galway fought back and went two points up twelve minutes into the second half, however, they failed to score for the rest of the game. Four minutes before the end of the game another long-range free for Kilkenny ended up in the net behind Shinnors. It was a score which summed up the day for Linnane's side as Kilkenny went on to win by 2–12 to 1–8..

In 1980 Galway defeated Kildare and Offaly to reach a second consecutive All-Ireland final. Munster champions Limerick provided the opposition on this occasion and an exciting championship decider followed. Bernie Forde and P. J. Molloy goals for Galway meant that the men from the west led by 2–7 to 1–5 at half-time. Éamonn Cregan single-handedly launched the Limerick counter-attack in the second-half. Over the course of the game he scored 2–7, including an overhead goal and a point in which he showed the ball to full-back Conor Hayes and nonchalantly drove the ball over the bar. It was not enough to stem the tide and Galway went on to win the game by 2–15 to 3–9. It was Galway's first All-Ireland title since 1923, with Linnane picking up a winners' medal and the celebrations surpassed anything ever seen in Croke Park.

1981 saw Galway reach a third consecutive All-Ireland final and Offaly were the opponents. Everything seemed to be going well for Linnane's side as Galway hoped to capture a second consecutive All-Ireland title. Offaly 'keeper Damien Martin was doing great work in batting out an almost certain Galway goal early in the second-half. With twenty-three minutes left in the game Galway led by six points, however, they failed to score for the rest of the game. Johnny Flaherty hand-passed Offaly's second goal with just three minutes remaining. At the long whistle Galway were defeated by 2–12 to 0–15.

Galway shocked reigning All-Ireland champions Cork in the semi-final to reach the decider once again in 1985. Offaly provided the opposition in the subsequent All-Ireland final and another tense game ensued. Once again it was Offaly's goal-scoring ability that proved crucial. Pat Cleary scored the first of the day after twenty-five minutes of play and got his second less than half a minute after the restart. Joe Dooley had a goal disallowed halfway through the second-half while a long Joe Cooney effort, which seemed to cross the goal line, was not given. P. J. Molloy was Galway's goal scorer, however, the day belonged to Offaly. A 2–11 to 1–12 score line resulted in defeat for Galway. In spite of this defeat Linnane later picked up his first All-Star award.

Galway reached a second successive All-Ireland decider again in 1986. The men from the west were the red-hot favourites against an ageing Cork team, however, on the day a different story unfolded. Four Cork goals, one from John Fenton, two from Tomás Mulcahy and one from Kevin Hennessy, stymied the Galway attack and helped "the Rebels" to a 4–13 to 2–15 victory. Linnane later collected a second All-Star award.

Linanne won his first National Hurling League medal in 1987 following a 3–12 to 3–10 league decider defeat of Clare. Later that summer Galway qualified for a third All-Ireland final in-a-row. The prospect of becoming the first team to lose three consecutive championship deciders weighed heavily on the Galway team as Kilkenny provided the opposition. The game was not a classic by any standard, however, Noel Lane, who started the game on the sideline and was introduced as a substitute, got a key goal for Galway nine minutes before the end. A 1–12 to 0–9 victory gave Linnane a second All-Ireland medal.

In 1988 Galway reached a fourth successive All-Ireland final and were favourites to retain the title. After more than a decade-and-a-half in the wilderness Tipperary were back providing the opposition in the championship decider. Galway defeated Tipp in the semi-final the previous year, however, with an extra year's experience it was expected that Tipperary might shade the victory. Galway used this to motivate themselves. Noel Lane was introduced as a substitute once again and scored a crucial goal while Nicky English sent a late penalty over the bar for a point. A 1–15 to 0–14 score line resulted in victory for Galway and a third All-Ireland medal for Linnane. He later won a third All-Star award.

Linnane collected a second National League medal in 1989 following a 2–16 to 4–8 defeat of Tipperary. For the third time in as many years both sides later met in the All-Ireland series, however, on this occasion the men from the West were controversially without their star player Tony Keady. The game turned out to be a tense and unsavory affair as Tipp finally triumphed over Galway. A 1–17 to 2–11 victory for the Munster men meant that Galway's three-in-a-row dream was over. Linnane retired from inter-county hurling following this defeat.

=== Inter-provincial ===
Linnane also lined out with Connacht in the inter-provincial series of games and enjoyed much success.

In 1980 Linnane was at left wing-back as Connacht faced Railway Cup specialists Munster in the decider. A low-scoring game followed, however, a 1–5 to 0–7 victory gave Connacht their first Railway Cup title since 1947. It was Linnane's first winners' medal in the inter-pro competition.

Connacht reached the Railway Cup final again in 1982. A 3–8 to 2–9 victory over Leinster gave Linnane his second Railway Cup medal. Defeat of the same opposition in 1983 allowed Connacht to retain the title for the first time in their history.

After defeat to Munster in 1985, both sides renewed their rivalry in the inter-provincial decider again in 1986. A comprehensive 3–11 to 0–11 victory gave Linnane a fourth Railway Cup medal.

== Honours ==
=== Player ===
Gort

- Connacht Senior Club Hurling Championship (2): 1982, 1984
- Galway Senior Club Hurling Championship (2): 1982, 1984

Galway

- All-Ireland Senior Hurling Championship (3): 1980, 1987, 1988
- National Hurling League (2): 1986–87, 1988–89

Connacht

- Railway Cup (4): 1980, 1982, 1983, 1986

=== Individual ===
Awards

- All-Star (3): 1985, 1986, 1988
