= Bishop of Kilmacduagh =

Episcopal title in Ireland

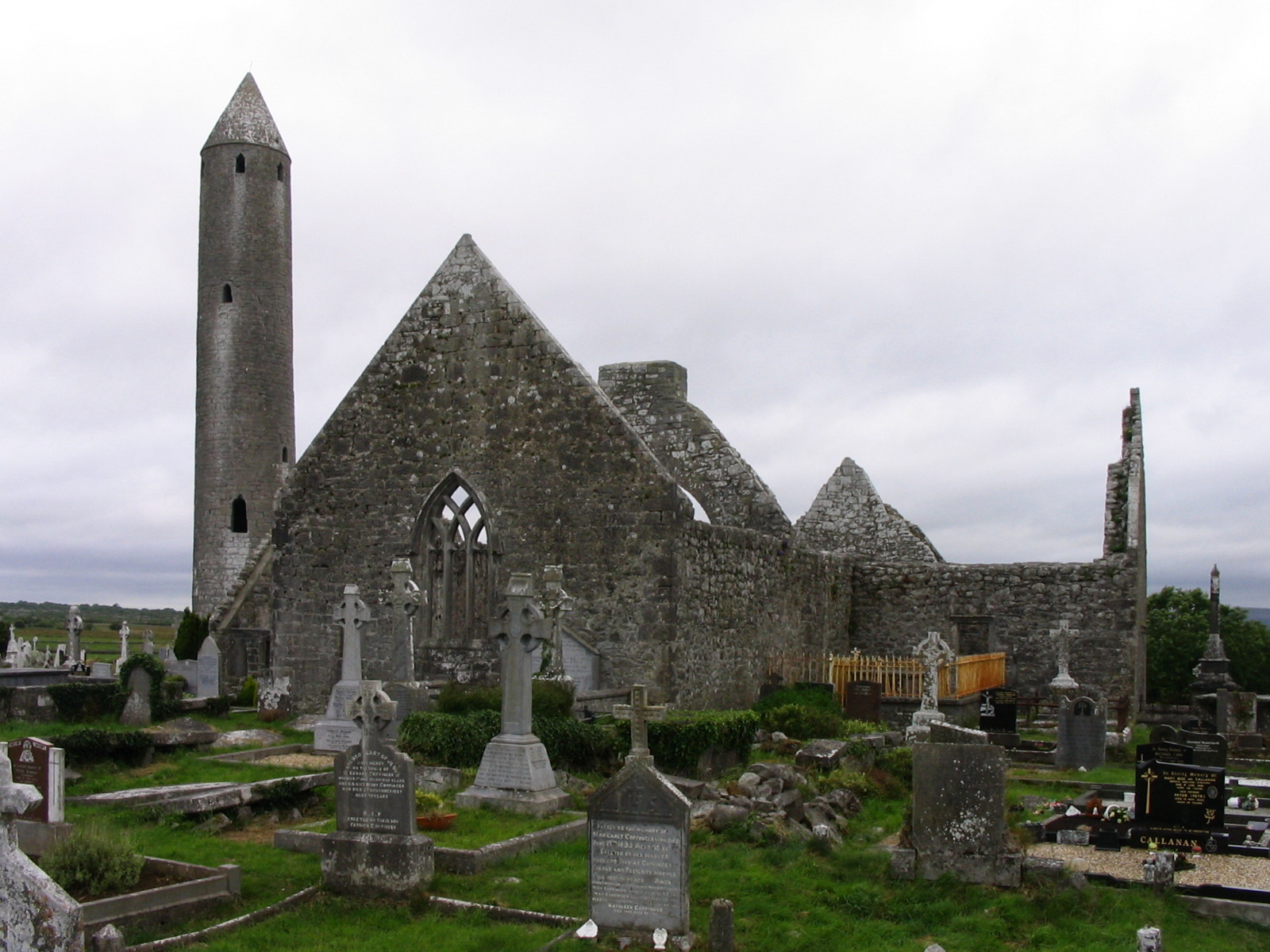
The ruined cathedral at Kilmacduagh, with round tower in background

The Bishop of Kilmacduagh was an episcopal title which took its name after the village of Kilmacduagh in County Galway, Ireland. In both the Church of Ireland and the Roman Catholic Church, the title is now united with other bishoprics.

== History ==
In the seventh century, the monastery of Kilmacduagh was founded by Saint Colman, son of Duagh. It was not until 1152 that the Diocese of Kilmacduagh was established at the Synod of Kells. After the Reformation, there were parallel apostolic successions.

=== Church of Ireland ===
The Church of Ireland bishopric of Kilmacduagh was united with Clonfert to form the united bishopric of Clonfert and Kilmacduagh in 1625. Under the Church Temporalities (Ireland) Act 1833 (3 & 4 Will. 4. c. 37), the united see became part of the bishopric of Killaloe and Clonfert in 1834. Since 1976, Kilmacduagh has been one of the sees held by the Bishop of Limerick and Killaloe.

=== Roman Catholic Church ===
The Roman Catholic Church bishopric of Kilmacduagh continued as a separate title until 1750 when Pope Benedict XIV decreed that it be united with the bishopric of Kilfenora. The bishop of the united dioceses was to be alternately bishop of one diocese and apostolic administrator of the other, since the two dioceses were in different ecclesiastical provinces. The first bishop under this new arrangement was Peter Kilkelly, who had been Bishop of Kilmacduagh since 1744, became Apostolic Administrator of Kilfenora in September 1750. Since 1883, the two sees have been part of the united Diocese of Galway, Kilmacduagh and Kilfenora.

== Pre-Reformation bishops ==
Pre-Reformation Bishops of Kilmacduagh
| From | Until | Incumbent | Notes |
|---|---|---|---|
| unknown | 1137 | ?Ua Clérig | Died in office |
| unknown | 1176 | Ímar Ua Ruaidín | Died in office |
| before 1179 | 1204 | Mac Gilla Cellaig Ua Ruaidín | Died in office |
| 1206 | 1215 | I. Ua Cellaig | Elected bishop before February 1206; died 1215 |
| unknown | 1224 | Máel Muire Ó Connaig | Died in office |
| 1227 | unknown | Áed | Formerly Precentor of Kilmacduagh; elected before 12 May 1227 and received possession of the temporalities after that date; date of death or end of episcopate unknown; also known as Odo |
| unknown | 1247 | Conchobar Ó Muirdaig | Died in office |
| 1248 | 1253 | Gilla Cellaig Ó Ruaidín | Elected before 5 May 1248 and received possession of the temporalities after that date; died before 10 November 1253; also known as Gillebertus |
| 1254 | 1284 | Mauricius Ó Leaáin | Elected before 15 May 1254 and received possession of the temporalities after that date; died before 16 January 1284 |
| 1284 | 1290 | David Ó Sétacháin | Elected and received possession of the temporalities after 27 March 1284; died before 13 June 1290 |
| 1290 | 1307 | Lúrint Ó Lachtnáin | Formerly Abbot of Knockmoy; elected bishop before 10 August 1290 and received possession of the temporalities after that date; died before 1 March 1307; also known as Laurentius |
| c.1307 | 1325 | Lucas | Elected bishop circa 1307; died 1325 |
| 1326 | c.1357 | Johannes | Elected before May 1326 and received possession of the temporalities on 14 May 1326; died circa 1357 |
| 1358 | 1393 | Nicol Ó Leaáin | Appointed 16 November 1358 and consecrated in 1360; died before October 1393 |
| 1394 | 1397 | Gregorius Ó Leaáin | Appointed 14 October 1393 and consecrated circa 1394; confirmed bishop 30 August 1396; died 1397 |
| 1397 | 1405 | See vacant | |
| 1405 | unknown | Énri Ó Connmhaigh | Translated from Clonfert 11 March 1405; date of death or end of episcopate unknown |
| unknown | 1410 | Dionysius | Died circa May 1410 |
| 1409 | 1418 | Eugenius Ó Faoláin | Appointed 23 September 1409 (papal bulls expediated 25 May 1410; translated to Bishop of Killaloe 6 July 1418 |
| 1418 | 1419 | Diamaid Ó Donnchadha | Appointed and consecrated circa July 1418; died before October 1419 |
| 1419 | | (Nicol Ó Duibhghiolla) | Elected before October 1419, but did not take effect |
| 1419 | 1441 | Seaán Ó Connmhaigh | Appointed 23 October 1419; died before May 1441 |
| 1441 | 1478 | Dionysius Ó Donnchadha | Appointed 10 May 1441; died before December 1478 |
| 1479 | 1503 | Cornelius "'O'Mullony" | Appointed 8 January 1479; resigned 8 March 1503; possibly was surnamed Ó Maoldomhnaigh |
| 1503 | 1533 | Matthaeus Ó Briain | Appointed 8 March 1503; died before August 1533 |
| 1533 | | (Malachias O'Mallony) | Appointed 8 August 1533, but did not take effect |

== Bishops during the Reformation ==
Bishops of Kilmacduagh during the Reformation
| From | Until | Incumbent | Notes |
|---|---|---|---|
| 1533 | 1542 | Christopher Bodkin | Appointed 3 September and consecrated 4 November 1533; accepted royal supremacy and appointed Church of Ireland Archbishop of Tuam by King Henry VIII on 15 February 1537, but continued to hold Kilmacduagh; absolved from schism by Cardinal Pole and appointed Roman Catholic apostolic administrator of Tuam and Kilmacduagh 7 October 1555; died in office in 1572; also known as Christopher Bobkyn or Bodekin |
| 1542 | 1555 | Cornelius O'Dea | Appointed Roman Catholic bishop by the Holy See on 5 May 1542 in opposition to Bodkin, but was unable to get possession of the see; not known if he was ever consecrated; resigned when Bodkin was absolved in 1555 |

== Post-Reformation bishops ==
=== Church of Ireland succession ===
Church of Ireland Bishops of Kilmacduagh
| From | Until | Incumbent | Notes |
|---|---|---|---|
| 1573 | 1582 | Stephen Kirwan | Nominated 9 January 1572 and appointed by letters patent 13 April 1573; translated to Clonfert 24 May 1582; also known as Stephen Kerovan and O'Kirwan |
| 1582 | 1585 | See vacant | |
| 1585 | | (Thomas Burke) | Referred as the bishop-elect in 1585, but was not consecrated |
| 1585 | 1587 | See vacant | |
| 1587 | 1625 | Roland Lynch | Nominated 9 January and consecrated in August 1587; also held in commendam the see of Clonfert 1602-1626; died in December 1625 |
In 1626, the Church of Ireland see became part of the united the bishopric of Clonfert and Kilmacduagh

=== Roman Catholic succession ===
Roman Catholic Bishops of Kilmacduagh
| From | Until | Incumbent | Notes |
|---|---|---|---|
| 1576 | 1610 | Malachy O'Moloney | Translated from Killaloe 22 August 1576; died 1610 |
| 1610 | 1629 | See vacant | |
| 1629 | unknown | Oliver Burke, O.P. | Appointed vicar apostolic by papal brief 28 November 1629 |
| 1647 | 1656 | Hugh Burke, O.F.M. | Appointed 11 March 1647; died circa 1656 |
| 1671 | unknown | Michael Lynch | Appointed vicar apostolic by papal brief 30 June 1671 |
| 1703 | 1713 | Ambrose Madden | Translated from Killala; appointed 15 November 1703 and again 15 March 1707, but was not consecrated and probably acted as administrator; translated to Clonfert 15 September 1713 |
| 1713 | 1720 | See vacant | |
| 1720 | unknown | Francis de Burgo | Appointed 5 June and consecrated 1 May 1720; death date or end of episcopate unknown |
| 1723 | 1732 | Bernard O'Hara, O.F.M. | Appointed December 1723; died before November 1732 |
| 1732 | unknown | Martin (Milo) Burke | Appointed 22 November 1732; consecrated 8 March 1733; death date or end of episcopate unknown |
| 1744 | 1783 | Peter Killikelly, O.P. | Appointed 22 June and consecrated 14 October 1744; also became Apostolic Administrator of Kilfenora when the two dioceses united in September 1750; died 29 May 1783 |
In 1750, the Roman Catholic see became part of the united bishopric of Kilmacduagh and Kilfenora
