= Richard Martyn (mayor of Galway) =

Irish politician and lawyer

Richard Óge Martyn (c. 1602 – 1648) was a Galway lawyer and member of the Catholic Confederates of Ireland. He was of the senior line of the Martyn family, one of the Tribes of Galway. He lived at Dunguaire Castle, Kinvarra. He worked with his brother-in-law and first cousin, Patrick D'Arcy, against the Plantation of Connaught in the 1630s, and served on the Supreme Council of the Confederate Catholics in the 1640s.

Martyn also served as Mayor of Galway, 1642–1643. He and D'Arcy were part of a network of Catholic lawyers in Galway who contrived to continue in practice in defiance of the penal laws, which barred Catholics from the professions. Richard was admitted to the King's Inns in 1631: he was suspended from practice at the Irish Bar in 1635 as a known Catholic, but permitted to resume practice in 1637, apparently because he had sworn the Oath of Supremacy.

Friends and acquaintances included John Lynch, Mary Bonaventure Browne, and Sir Dermott Ó Seachnasaigh. His contemporaries included Mícheál Ó Cléirigh and Randal MacDonnell, 1st Marquess of Antrim.

== 1641 Depositions ==
Martyn is mentioned in several of the 1641 Depositions concerning the events in Galway from early 1642 to summer 1643, in which he took a leading part:

- William Hamond – And also deposeth that dureing his abode in his Maiesties fort of Galway, (from Christmas 1641 till May 1643) he obserued the Inhabitants of the Towne of Galway almost wholly to be open Rebels, amongst the which were most actiue, Sir Tho. Blake, (kild with their owne Ordinance shooting against a Pinace <a> of the Kings) Sir Val. Blake. ffrancis Blake, John Blake (& many more of that Name) Rich. Martyn (Mayor at michielmas 1642) Patricke Darcy, Olliuer oge french, George Browne, Andr Browne; Dominicke Skerrit, etc. ... He also sayth that being in the fort of Galway, he was told by Patricke french, & John Joyce (then Prisoners in the sayd <D> forte) that Patricke Darcy and Richard Martyn Lawyers were the men that first moued the Towne of Galway to Rebellion, both by their letters from Dublin and theire instigation when they came to Galway.
- Joseph Hampton – And further saith That the parties hereafter mencioned haue bin great actors & guilty of the present Rebellion in carrying armes partakeing with counselling assisting & helping one another and other Rebells therein and in the comitting and perpetrateing of divers outrages & cruelties vpon and against his Maiesties lojall subjects vizt and in the beseegeing of his Maiesties fort of Galway & of his maiesties subiects that held & kept the same (including) Richard Martin, Esquire a lawyere.
- William Lincoln – saith that Mr Martin and Mr Darcy the lawyeres <a> & Sir Tho: Blake were the principall advisers abetters and actors <of> in the Rebellion & siege at Galway aforesaid.
- Thomas Bagworth – saith that the other parties that this deponent knoweth to be actors in the present Rebellion and to partake with the Irish Rebells against the English are ...MrMartin a Counsellor at Law & now Maior of Galway: whoe promissed to releeve the fort there: But when he came to bee Major proved as badd or worse as then any other Rebell & would not releeve nor partake with them of the fforte.
- Andrew Darcy – Sayeth that in Springe Tyme 1641 There was a Counsell off eight men Constituted in open Court by the Mayor Aldermen and ffremen of Golloway at a Towsall Conveaned by the <a> instigacion off Richard oge Martin and John Blake fize Robert with an intent to rebell against the government of the English Nacion as afterwards appeares.

Among the most damning depositions are those given by John Turner:

- after this Examinant together with the said Robert Clarke went from the fort to the towne of Galway: vpon whose comeing there was a Court of assembly called where were present the Maior Adermen and burgesses of the towne or the <a> greater part of them, and likewise Mr Patrick Darcy & Mr Martin Lawyeres Before whom this Examinant and the said Robert Clark were called And this Examinant shewing the said warrant before the said assembly, the said Mr Darcy and Mr Martin being present, They the said Mr Darcy & Mr Martin Did there publickly declare that it was treason in this Examinant and the said Clark to hinder & deteine the said Armes from them by virtue of the said warrant (they then pretending themselues to be his Maiesties subjects) And therevpon committed both of them to the towne gaole of Galway where they remained for the space of 10 or 12 dayes following vntil they were released by the Erle of Clanrickard, And this Examinant further saith That the said Erle of Clanrickard did make an end of the said differences betweene the merchant of the said shipp & the said Robert Clarke, and did assure the said Clarke that all things shold be fairly carried But the said Erle Leaving the said towne of Galway the said Dominick Keghran factor to the said Tho: Linch with divers others, (by the direction of the said Mr Darcy and Mr Martin (as this examinant verely beleeveth went aboard the said shipp & carrjed with them seuerall boats, vpon pretence to vnlade the salt, And vpon their comeing to the said shipp (the said Clark being at the fort, and some of his men to out of the ship to fetche Ballast) entered the said ship and killd the Masters Mate and twoe or 3 more of the men aboard the said shipp and wounded seuerall others there, & soe possessed themselues wholly of the said shipp, being of the burden of three hundred tun or thereabouts, And likewise tooke out of the said shipp, about tenn peece of ordinance, which were landed presently, and planted against his Maiesties fort And further this Examinant saith That in the beginning of the Rebellion, vntill such tyme as the said Mr Darcie and Mr Martin came to the towne of Galway, they within the said fort were furnished of such necessaries as they wanted for their moneys But after the comeing of the said Mr Darcy and Mr Martin to the said towne, the townsmen admitted the Irish people of Err Connaght, to come into the said towne, whoe robbed this examinant and the English Inhabitants within the said towne and Killd & murthered seuerall of them: Amongst which they cut off the heads of one John Fox & his wiffe, and murthered one Mris Collins as she was kneeling at her prayers, And as this examinant hath heard, after the said murders were committed the Irish tumbled the heads of the heads of the said ffox & his wiffe about the streets, And further saith That at althoughe the said people of Err Connaght had robbed and murthered the English as aforesaid: yet neither the Maior or Aldermen of Galway aforesaid or the said Darcy <a> or Martin did any way punish the offenders, but rather abetted and manteined them in their barbarous cruelties And this Examinant further saith That after, by direction & helpe of the towne of Galway the said fort was s beseiged, And the townsmen of Galway hyred the Cuntry to doe the same Soe that the fort was inforced to yield about the xxvth of June 1643: Wherevpon this Examinant went into the towne of Galway to demand some of his goods according to the quarter given them, And in the meane time the shipping being in the harbour went away & left this examinant behynd Soe as he was inforced to get a Convoy to Bonrattee to the Erle of Thomond, And being there one Dunn servant of Sir Roger ô Shafnusy, related to the Erle of Thomond and him this Examinant, that he sawe the said Richard Martin whoe was then Major of Galway, vpon a Sunday morning with a pick ax in his hand setting people on work to domolish & pull downe the fort of Galway John Turner Jurat. 23. Martij. 1643.

== Family and descendants ==
He was survived by his wife, Magdalene French, and five surviving children, Oliver Óge Martyn, Peter Martyn, John, Patrick and Magdalene, and his father Oliver Mór Martyn. He is an ancestor of both the first president of Sinn Féin, Edward Martyn (1859–1923), and the leader of the Irish Unionist Alliance and Ulster Unionist Party Edward Carson, Baron Carson (1854–1935).

A later descendant was the Hungarian artist, Ferenc Martyn (1899–1986).

He was a kinsman to Richard Martin (1754–1834), who was likewise an Irish nationalist.

== See also ==
- The Tribes of Galway

Civic offices
Preceded by Walter Lynch	Mayor of Galway; 1641–1642	Succeeded by Sir Valentine Blake
