= Killing of Eileen Quinn =

1920 police shooting in Ireland

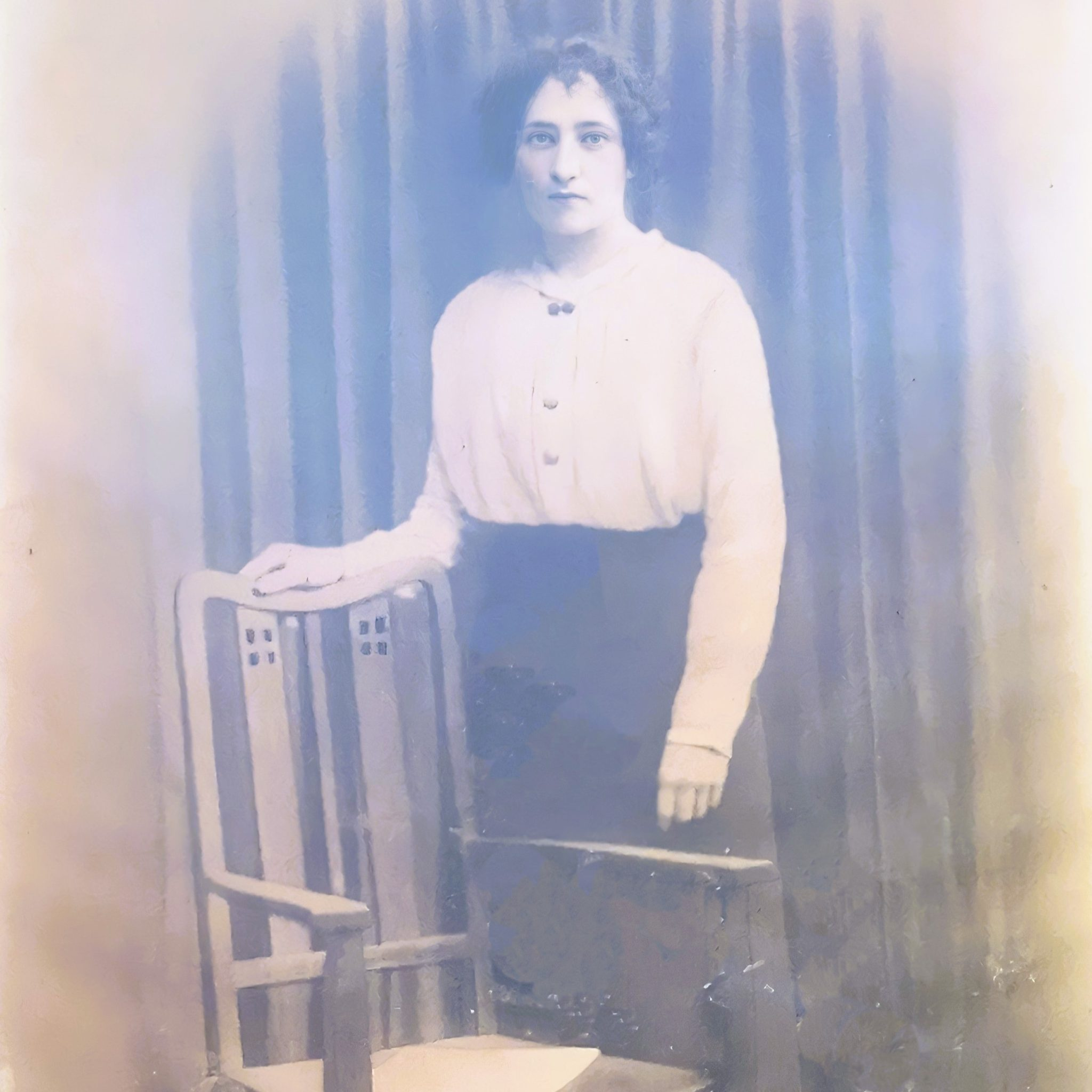
- Eileen Quinn
- Born: Eileen Gilligan; 12 April 1895; County Galway, Ireland
- Died: 1 November 1920 (aged 25); Kiltartan, Gort, County Galway
- Cause of death: Shot
- Citizenship: United Kingdom of Great Britain and Ireland

Eileen Quinn (née Gilligan; 12 April 1895 – 1 November 1920) was a young mother from County Galway. On All Saints' Day 1920, she was shot dead outside her home by the Black and Tans of the Royal Irish Constabulary (RIC) in what was described as "essentially a drive-by shooting". The incident was one of the most notorious civilian reprisal killings during the Irish War of Independence.

== Background ==
Eileen Gilligan was born on 12 April 1895. Her parents were Martin and Mary Gilligan (née Green) who farmed at Raheen in County Galway. In 1917, she married Malachy Quinn. By the time she turned 25, in 1920, she was the mother of three young children. In the spring of 1920, the Black and Tans of the Royal Irish Constabulary (RIC) were deployed to Ireland to fight in the Irish War of Independence. The month of November was an extremely violent time in the county. Eileen Quinn and her family lived at Kiltartan near Gort. Her husband Malachy was a farmer. Their farm was located on the main Galway/Gort road. As a barracks town, Gort had a particularly strong presence of British forces, including both soldiers and policemen.

== Killing ==
On 1 November 1920, Quinn was seven months pregnant and waiting for her husband Malachy to return from the fair in town. It was All Saints' Day and she was sitting on the front wall of her house with her three young children when she was shot. Her nine month old baby had been on her lap. The bullet pierced her stomach and the child she was holding fell from her arms. She crawled back to the house to tell her servant that she was shot, exclaiming, "Take in the little children!". Alarm was raised and local women tried to save both Eileen and her unborn child. One of the doctors who attended her, Doctor Sandys, said, "She had bled so much that she could bleed no more". Malachy returned home to find his wife dying on the kitchen settee. He had followed a trail of blood that led from the front garden wall.

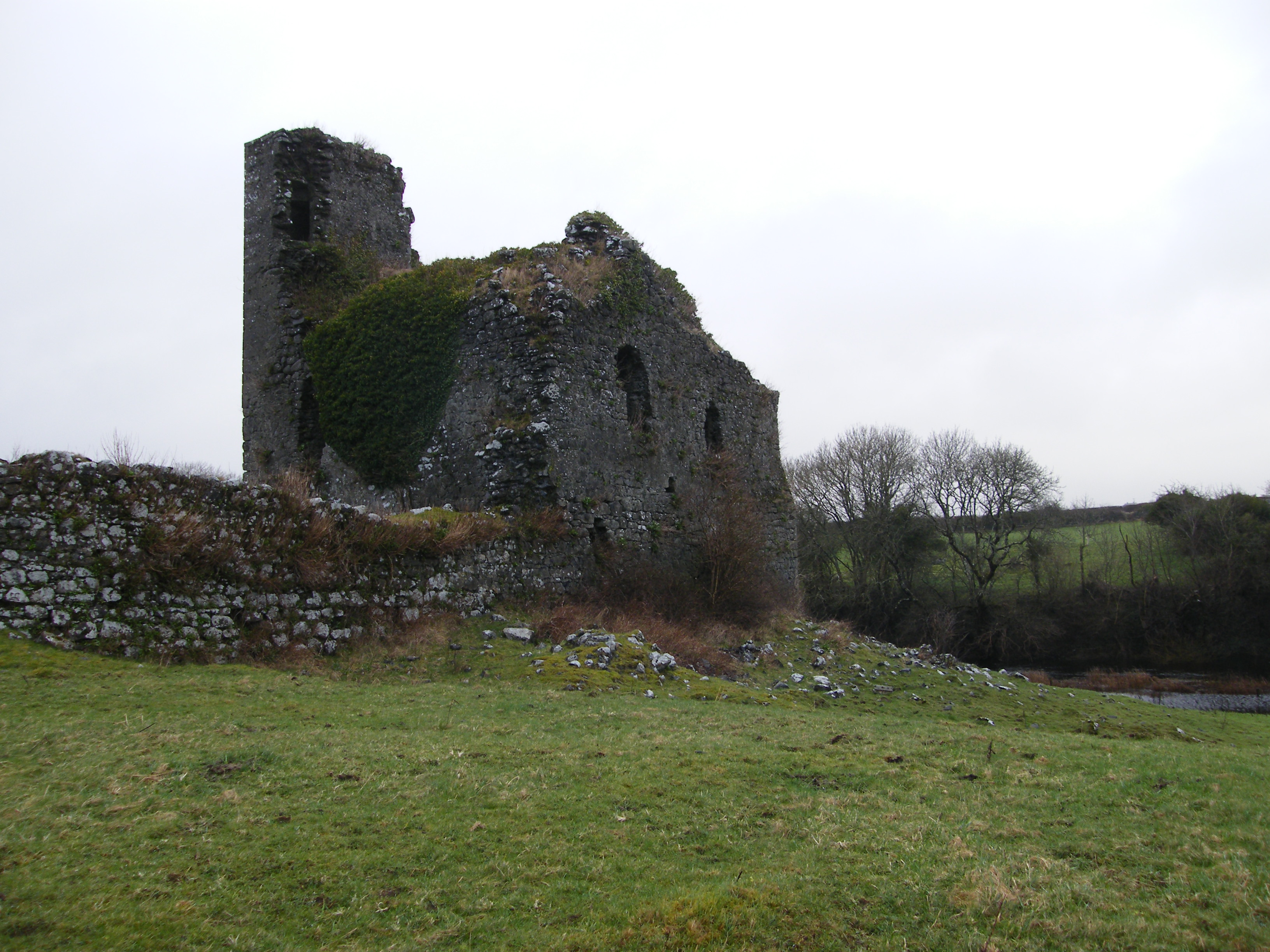
Kiltartan Castle located near the Quinn farm

The local priest, Father John Considine, was called to the house on the evening of her murder. Eileen had told him that she was shot by Black and Tans on a truck as they passed by her house. Father Considine administered the last rites to Eileen and later strongly condemned the murder from the altar. The RIC chief constable in Gort refused to take a formal statement from her as she lay dying. She died from being mortally wounded eight hours after she had been shot. The incident was considered as "essentially a drive-by shooting". Eileen was shot in what her family believed was a reprisal for the killing of an RIC constable, Timothy Horan, two days earlier in an Irish Republican Army ambush five miles away at Castledaly.

A Military Court of Inquiry was held by British authorities three days after her death, the same day as her funeral, and recorded a verdict of death by misadventure. Despite an inquest, no one was ever held accountable for her murder. The fatal shot had come from a moving vehicle and so no one person was blamed. Days after the killing, RIC personnel took two brothers from South Galway from their home and tortured them before killing both and dumping their bodies.

== Reactions ==
On 8 March 1921, the British government made an ex gratia grant of £300 to Malachy Quinn. The case was referenced by the poet and Nobel Prize winner W. B. Yeats in his poems "Nineteen Hundred and Nineteen" and "Reprisals". The local protestant landlord and patron of Yeats Lady Gregory wrote angrily about the killing in her journals. When she heard about the case she wrote six articles in The Nation to alert the British public to atrocities being carried out in Ireland. However, she did not approve of these poems due to his references to her deceased son Robert.

The case was raised in the House of Commons on a number of occasions. Chief Secretary for Ireland Sir Hamar Greenwood was questioned on the case every week throughout the month of November by numerous Members of Parliament (MPs). Greenwood said "two police lorries were passing at the time, and it may be that the wounding resulted from a shot fired in anticipation of an ambush in the neighbourhood".

The then-young Conservative MP Oswald Mosley questioned the Chief Secretary on 25 November 1920:

[whether] Mrs. Eileen Quinn, of Kiltartan, County Galway, was killed by a shot fired from a passing police lorry on 1st November, 1920, while sitting on a wall in broad daylight with a child in her arms; whether he will state the distance between this wall and the road from which the shot was fired; whether the position of Mrs. Quinn at the time she was shot was in full view of the road; whether the police occupying the lorry in question were called as witnesses at the court of inquiry; how many rounds of ammunition were fired by the occupants of this lorry in the course of their journey; and how far away was the nearest point at which murders of soldiers or policemen had occurred to the scene of Mrs. Quinn's death?

— Oswald Mosley, Parliament, Hansard

== Legacy ==
Her grandson Gerard Quinn is a human rights lawyer, and he has given talks on the case. Her grand niece is award-winning documentary maker Orla Higgins. In 2019, she made a documentary on the case for RTÉ entitled Reprisals: The Eileen Quinn Story. In 2023, Galway City Museum hosted an event in memory of Eileen Quinn.

In Labane, just 3.5 miles from the site of the killing, the local parochial hall is named after Eileen Quinn and the Loughnane Brothers. The hall was erected by Mr. Edward Martyn, but was burnt down by members of the RIC in September, 1920. It was rebuilt shortly after, by J. Canon Considine, who named it the "Loughnane and Quinn Memorial Hall".
