= Oliver Óge Martyn =

Irish Jacobite and landowner

Oliver Óge Martyn, Irish Jacobite and landowner, fl. ca. 1630-ca. 1709.

The eldest son of Richard Óge Martyn of Dunguaire Castle and his wife Magdalene French, he represented Galway Borough in the Patriot Parliament of 1689. He fought in the Williamite war in Ireland, been listed as a Major in Bourke's Musketeers, which last fought at the Battle of Aughrim. Several members of his family were killed, while his brother, Justice of the Court of Common Pleas (Ireland) Peter Martyn was exiled with his family during the Flight of the Wild Geese.

However, Martyn survived being attainted and held onto his lands through the provisions of the Treaty of Limerick. In 1709, when the British House of Commons passed the first major piece of anti-Catholic legislation, Martyn's Tullira estate was exempted from its property clauses because, as James Hardiman wrote, it had been noted that Oliver Martyn, of Tulliry, Co Galway, Esquire, was, during the rebellion, a person who behaved himself with great moderation, and was remarkably kind to numbers of Protestants in distress, many of which he supported in his own family, and by his charity and goodness saved their live. Therefore, it was enacted that he might enjoy his estates to him and his heirs, and settle and dispose of the same to his eldest son and heirs male.

He married Frances, daughter of John Donellan of Ballydonnelan, and Mary Daly, daughter of Charles Daly of Calla. They had had three sons. His notable descendants included Edward Martyn, Edward Carson, Baron Carson, and Ferenc Martyn.

== See also ==
- The Tribes of Galway

== Sources ==
- History of Galway, James Hardiman, Galway, 1820
- King James II's Irish Army List by D'Alton, ca. 1861
- Edward Martyn: An Aristocratic Bohemian, Madeline Humphries, 2007
