= Kinvara =

Village in south County Galway, Ireland

Kinvara Irish: Cinn Mhara
- Village
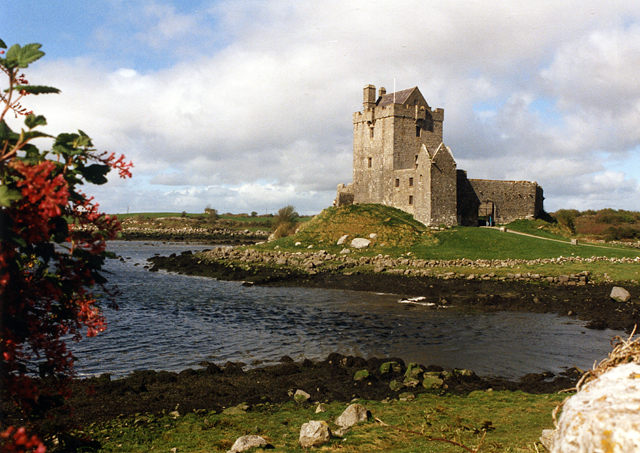
- Dunguaire Castle

- Location in Ireland
- Coordinates: 53.139°N 8.938°W
- Country: Ireland
- Province: Connacht
- County: County Galway
- Elevation: 10 m (33 ft)

Population (2022)
  - Total: 721
- Dialing code: 091
- Irish Grid Reference: M369103

Kinvara or Kinvarra (Irish: Cinn Mhara, meaning 'head of the sea') is a sea port village in the southwest of County Galway, Ireland. It is located in the civil parish of Kinvarradoorus in the north of the barony of Kiltartan. Kinvarra is also an electoral division.

== Geography ==
The village lies at the head of Kinvara Bay, known in Irish as Cinn Mhara (or more recently Cuan Cinn Mhara), an inlet in the south-eastern corner of Galway Bay, from which the village took its name. It lies in the north of the barony of Kiltartan, near the Burren.

The townland of Kinvarra lies in the civil parish of Kinvarradoorus. This civil parish is bounded on the north by Galway Bay, on the east by the parishes of Ballinderreen (Killeenavarra) and Ardrahan, on the south by the parishes of Gort (Kilmacduagh) and Boston (Kilkeedy) and on the west by the parishes of Carron and New Quay (Abbey and Oughtmama). It is roughly coextensive with the Ó hEidhin territory of Coill Ua bhFiachrach (wood of the Uí Fhiachrach), and this name was still in use in the mid-19th century as recorded by John O'Donovan in his Ordnance Survey letters.

== History ==
=== Early history ===
Evidence of ancient settlement in the area include a number of promontory fort and ring fort sites in the surrounding townlands of Dungory West, Ballybranagan and Loughcurra North. There are similar sites, as well as the ruins of lime kiln and 18th century windmill, within Kinvarra townland itself.

=== Dunguaire Castle ===
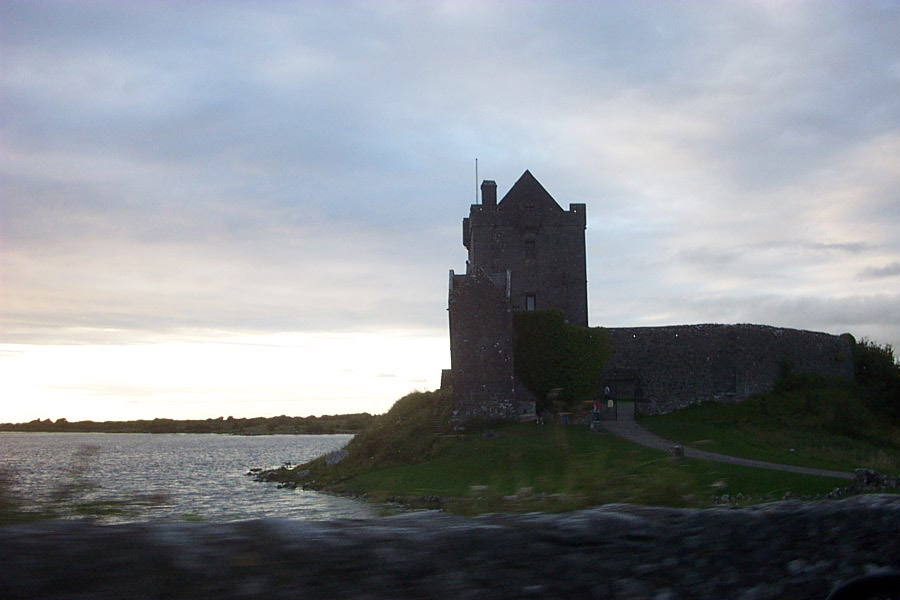
Dún Guaire castle

Dunguaire Castle (Irish: Dún Guaire [lit, the Castle of Guaire]), a 16th-century towerhouse of the Ó hEidhin (O'Hynes) clan, is located to the east of the village. A Fearadhach Ó hEidhin (Faragh O'Hynes) is recorded as the owner of the castle in a 1574 list of castles and their owners covering County Galway. This list was thought to have been compiled for the use of the Lord Deputy Sir Henry Sidney who planned the composition of Connacht.

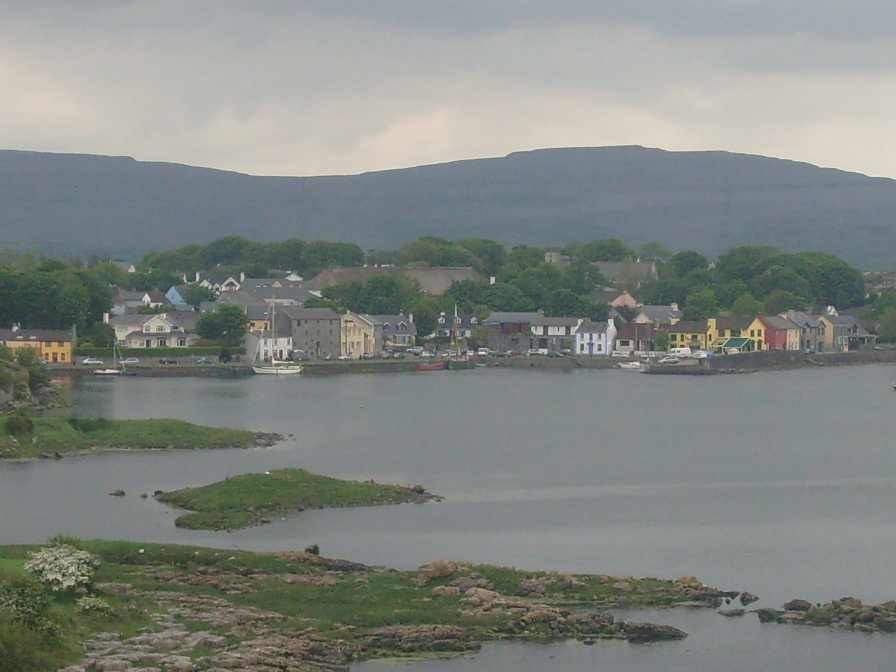
View of Kinvara from Dún Guaire Castle

=== Mass rock ===
The Poulnegan Altar, a Mass rock located near Kinvara, is known in Connaught Irish as Poll na gCeann ("chasm of the heads") and is said to have been the location of a massacre by the soldiers of Oliver Cromwell's New Model Army. Historian Tony Nugent states that, "According to local tradition, there was a college nearby and some of the student monks were killed there by Cromwellian soldiers while attending Mass and their heads were thrown into a nearby chasm".

=== Terry Alts ===
The Terry Alts, an Irish agrarian secret society of the early 19th century, was active in the Kinvara area. In 1831, a large group of Terry Alts gathered between Kinvara and New Quay on Abbey Hill in County Clare, and challenged government troops to battle. The group dispersed before the troops arrived. They also unsuccessfully attempted to ambush a detachment of soldiers at Corranroo in the west of the parish, which led to the death of one of their members.

== Population ==
The Great Famine in the 1840s, and a series of emigrations that continued until the 1960s, reduced the population of the village – once a thriving port and exporter of corn and seaweed – to no more than a few hundred people.

In the 25 years between the 1991 and 2016 census, the population of Kinvara increased by 70%, from 425 to 734 people.

== Religion ==
In the Catholic Church, the ecclesiastical parish of Kinvara is part of the Roman Catholic Diocese of Galway, Kilmacduagh and Kilfenora. Churches within Kinvara parish include Saint Colman's Church (built 1819) and Saint Joseph's Church (built 1877). Saint Joseph's Presbytery, formerly a convent, dates to c. 1875.

Kinvara lies within the Church of Ireland united Diocese of Limerick and Killaloe.

== Festivals ==
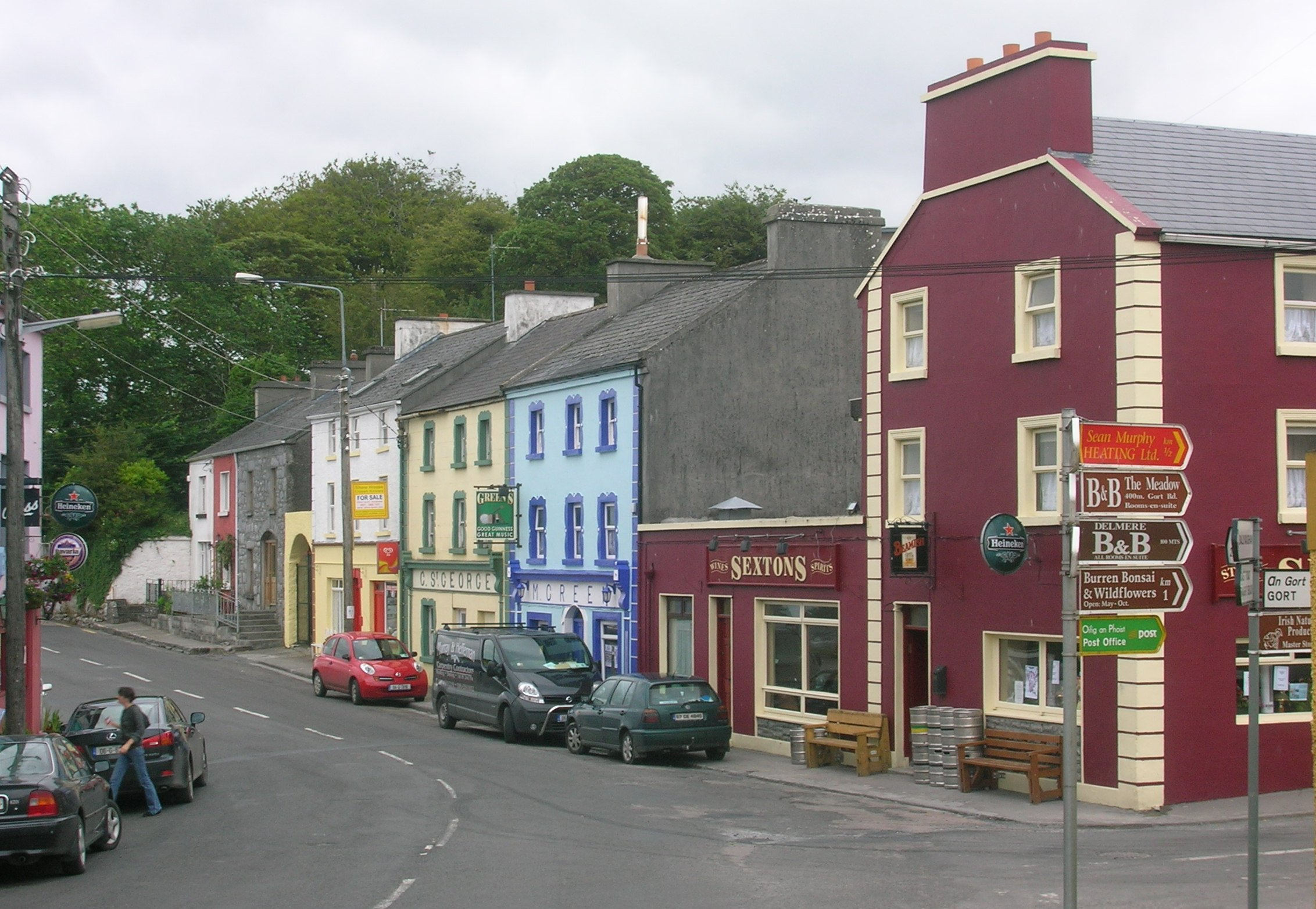
Street of Kinvara in 2007

Kinvara is home every year to two festivals, Fleadh na gCuach ("cuckoo festival") an Irish traditional music festival at the start of May and the Cruinniú na mBád ("gathering of the boats") in mid August.

== Sports ==
Kinvara is home to Kinvara GAA, a Gaelic Athletic Association club. The club is almost exclusively concerned with hurling but also plays Gaelic football at Junior level.

== Notable people ==
- Ailbhe of Ceann Mhara, 9th century cleric.
- Coman of Kinvara, early medieval saint.
- Francis Fahy, composer and poet, wrote the song "Galway Bay."
- Celia Lynch, politician.
- P. J. Mara, public affairs consultant and senator, was buried in Kinvara.
- Peter Martyn, judge.
- Eoghan Ó hEidhin, died 1340, King of Uí Fiachrach Aidhne.
- John Prine, American country folk singer-songwriter, had a home in Kinvara.
- Mathilda Twomey, Chief Justice of the Seychelles, first female holder of that office.
- Conor Whelan, hurler.
- Máire Whelan, judge and 30th Attorney General of Ireland from 2011 to 2017; first woman to hold this position.

== See also ==
- List of towns and villages in Ireland
- Island Eddy
