= Coman of Kinvara =

Medieval Irish saint

Coman of Kinvara was an early medieval Irish saint.

Coman is the patron saint of St. Coman's Church, Kinvara, County Galway, Ireland. The church is situated on a hillock within the town but has been abandoned since the late 19th century and is severely neglected.

Little is known of Coman. He appears to belong to the early historic era of Ireland; the Annals of the Four Masters noted the death of Ailbhe of Ceann Mhara in the year 814, so the presumption is that a church was already built, and dedicated, by the early 9th century. The Voyage of the Uí Chorra, dated to about the 11th century, describes the destruction of the church of the holy old man Coman of Kinvara.

It has been suggested that Coman should be identified with Colman MacDuagh or Caimin of Inis Cealtra. Both were related to Guaire Aidne mac Colmáin whose fort of Dunguaire Castle is located some hundreds of yards away. Other proposed identifications are that of Coman mac Faolchu (founder of Roscommon) or a Coman mac Domangin/Domaighin listed in the Martyrology of Tallaght and the Martyrology of Donegal.

The present church dates to ca. 1200, and was extensively rebuilt at one point during the late 15th-early 16th centuries. Burials in the graveyard continued into the early 20th century, and there are dozens of gravestones within and without the church. It was the subject of a four-season archaeological work from 2004 to 2007.
