= Peter Martyn (judge) =

Irish barrister, landowner and judge

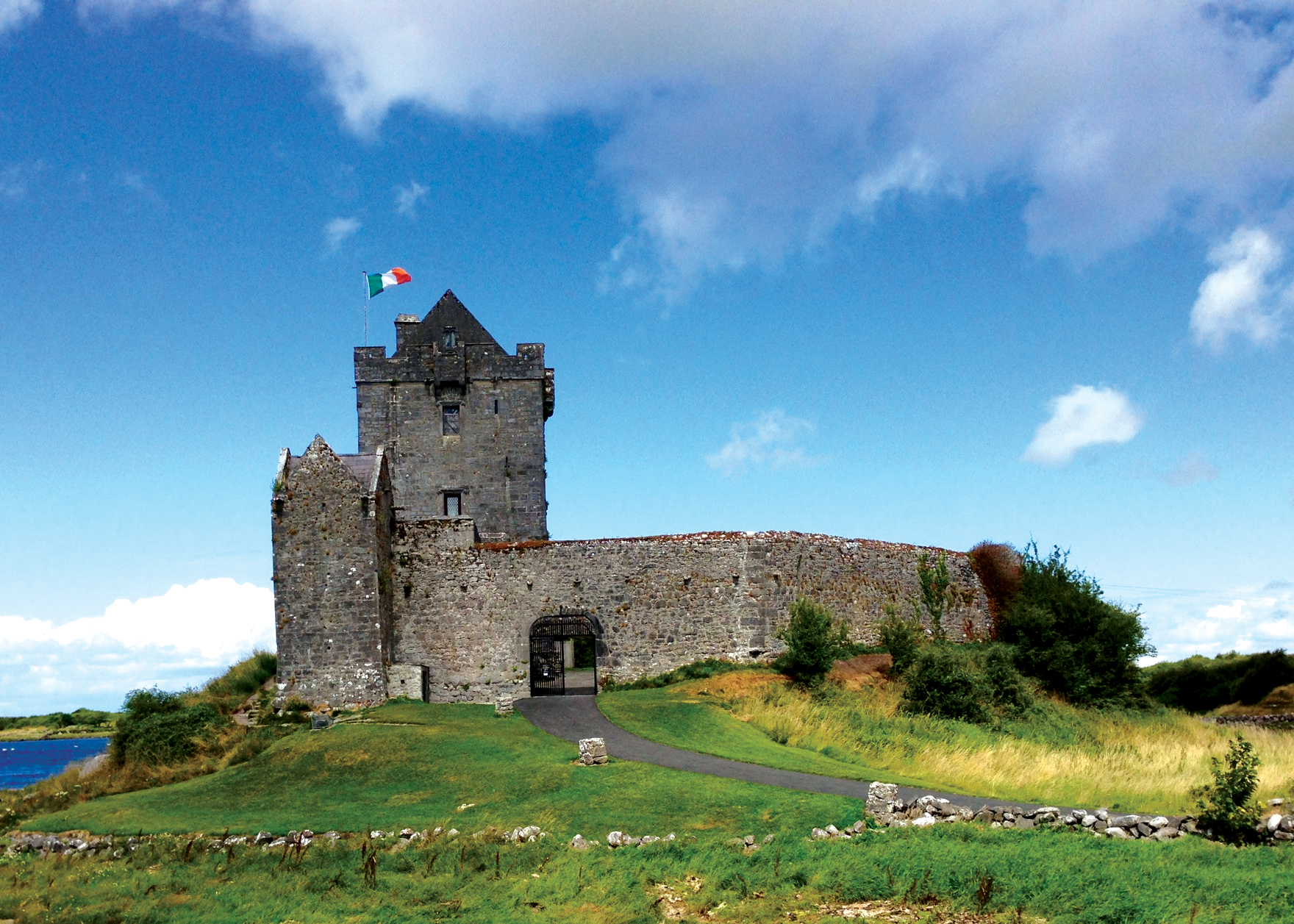
Dunguaire Castle, Peter Martyn's birthplace

Peter Martyn (born after 1630, died after 1690) was an Irish barrister, landowner and judge. He was one of the Roman Catholic judges appointed to the Irish Bench by King James II, as part of James's policy of creating an exclusively Catholic Irish administration. After the downfall of James' cause at the Battle of the Boyne he was accused of attempting to ingratiate himself with the new regime, but soon afterwards he was attainted. He later fled the country and died in exile.

== Background ==
He was born in Kinvara, County Galway, the second son of Richard Óge Martyn (died 1648) of Dunguaire Castle and his wife Magdalen French. His father was a wealthy landowner, lawyer and politician, who with his cousin Patrick D'Arcy belonged to a group of Roman Catholic lawyers in County Galway who continued to practice law in the 1630s in defiance of the Penal Laws, which barred Catholics from the practice of any profession, until the Crown finally put a stop to their practice; later Richard was a key figure in Confederate Ireland. His eldest son Oliver Óge Martyn, despite his father's dubious loyalty to the Crown, was able to hold on to the family estates; unlike his brother Peter, he was never attainted, apparently due to the high regard felt for him by his neighbours.

== Career ==
In the general atmosphere of religious toleration which followed the Restoration of Charles II (since both the King and his brother and heir James were known to incline to the Roman Catholic faith) Peter's cousin Patrick Darcy was able to resume his legal practice and may have encouraged Peter to follow him to the Irish Bar. Peter entered Middle Temple in 1663 and the King's Inn in 1673, and was on the Connaught Circuit in 1683. He became wealthy, and bought the manor of Kilconnel, County Galway.

On his accession to the English Crown in 1685, the Catholic King James II did not move at once to replace the Protestant judges on the Irish Bench, but by 1687 he had decided on a comprehensive policy of appointing Catholics to key positions. Ball points out that Martyn had only 14 years in practice; on the other hand, his wealth and social standing may have made him an acceptable candidate for judicial office. He was appointed third justice of the Court of Common Pleas (Ireland). He went regularly on the Connaught circuit as judge of assize.

== Disgrace and death ==
After King James' downfall at the Battle of the Boyne, Martyn, like many of his colleagues, tried hard to reach an understanding with the victorious King William III: it seems that he offered his services to the new regime, since he was described by Jacobite loyalists as "a civil governor in the enemy's quarter". The fact that his brother Oliver was pardoned for his services to James may have given him hope of similarly favourable treatment, but this proved to be an illusion: he was attainted and his estate at Kilconnel was forfeited. With his family he fled the country and died in exile; his precise date of death is unknown.

Burke, writing in 1885, described Martyn as a "great humourist" of whom many stories were still being told, but apparently, he did not think any of the stories memorable enough to repeat.
