= Tubber, County Clare =

Village in County Clare, Ireland

Tubber − An Tobar Kilkeedy − Cill Ceide
- Village
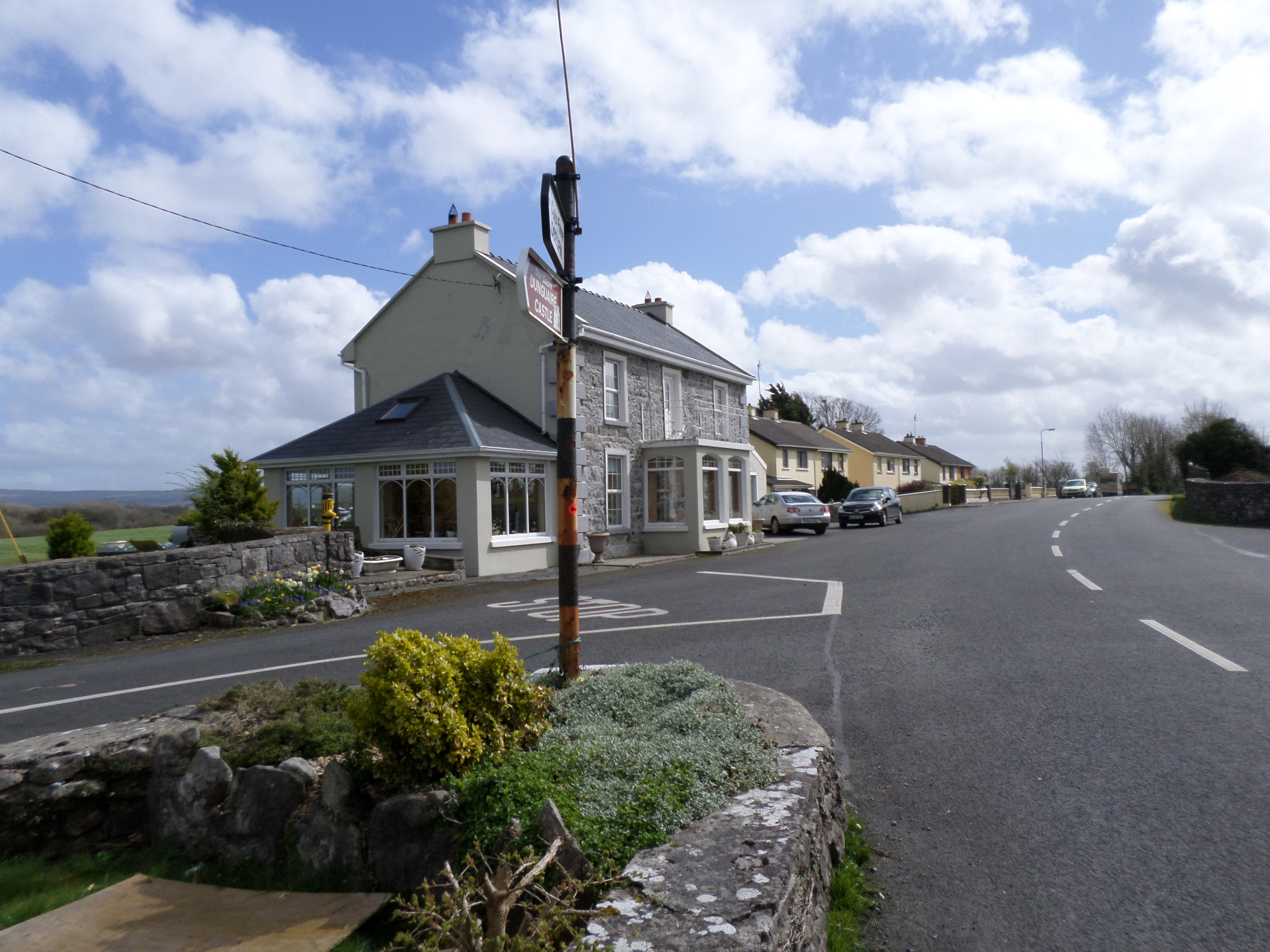
- Part of the village of Tubber, including the village pump

- Location of St Michael's church at Tubber Cross
- Coordinates: 52°59′24″N 8°53′39″W
- Country: Ireland
- Province: Munster
- County: County Clare
- Time zone: UTC+0 (WET)
  - Summer (DST): UTC-1 (IST (WEST))

Tubber (from Irish an Tobar 'the well') is a village in the north of County Clare, Ireland.

== Location ==
The village is part of the barony of Inchiquin, about 6 miles (9.7 km) from Corofin on the road to Gort in County Galway.

The village of Tubber in County Clare is the southern part of a loosely defined rural community that spans the border between County Galway and County Clare. Tubber, County Galway is adjacent and lies in the parish of Beagh in the Diocese of Kilmacduagh. The area as a whole roughly encompasses the townlands with a 3 miles (4.8 km) radius of St Michael's church at Tubber Cross.

A 2001 travelogue described Tubber as "a place a mile long with a pub at either end ... one part of it appeared to be in Clare, the other in Galway." The village of Tubber is small, centred on the church and the local primary school. Tubber National School was established in 1852 as part of the chapel of Tubber, with about a hundred pupils. It taught Reading, Writing, Arithmetic, History and Geography. The teacher was paid a small salary, and charged small fees to senior pupils who could afford it.

Conor Engineering has their plant on the Crusheen road. The company has been manufacturing farm machinery since 1969.

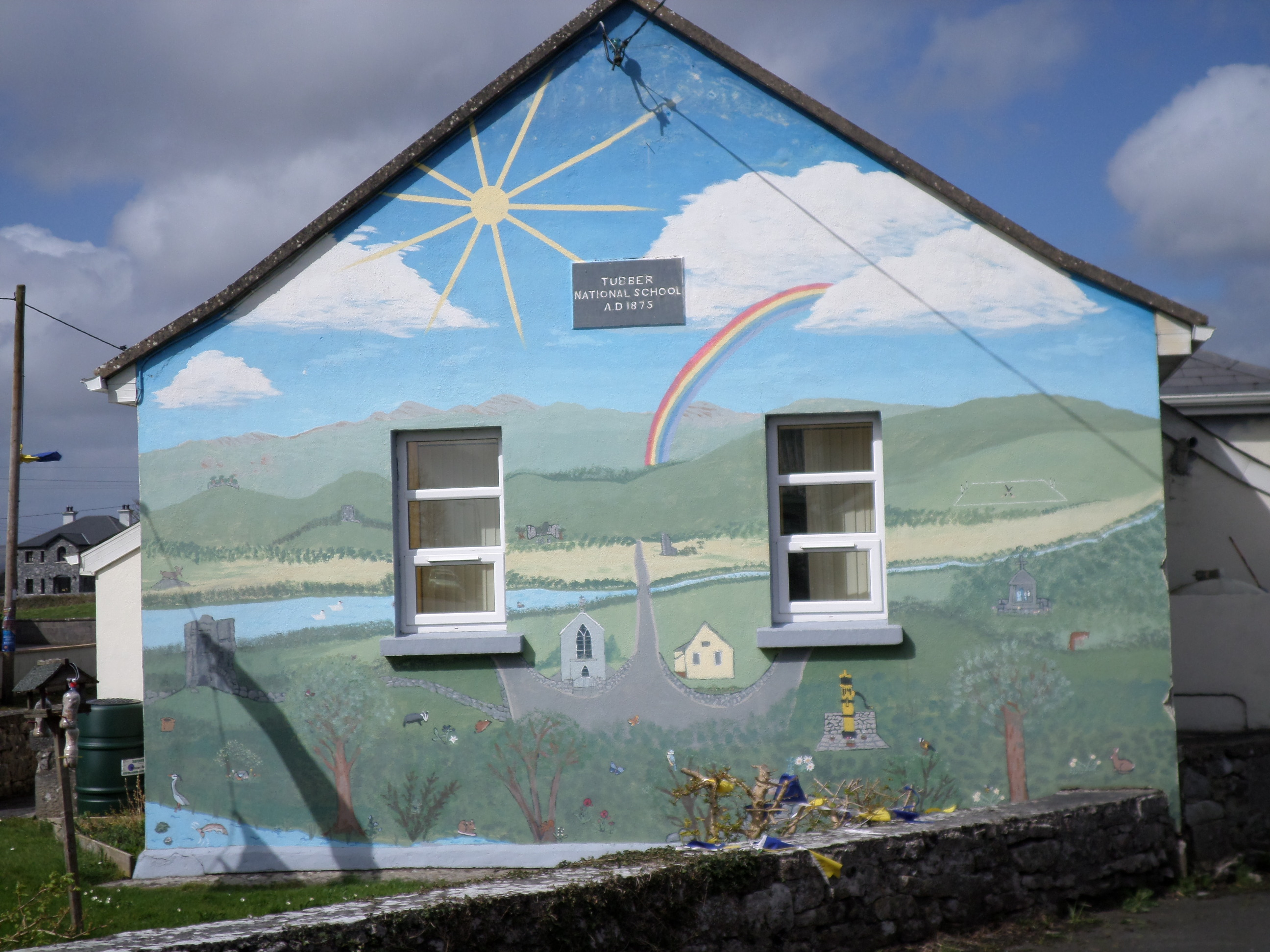
Tubber National School

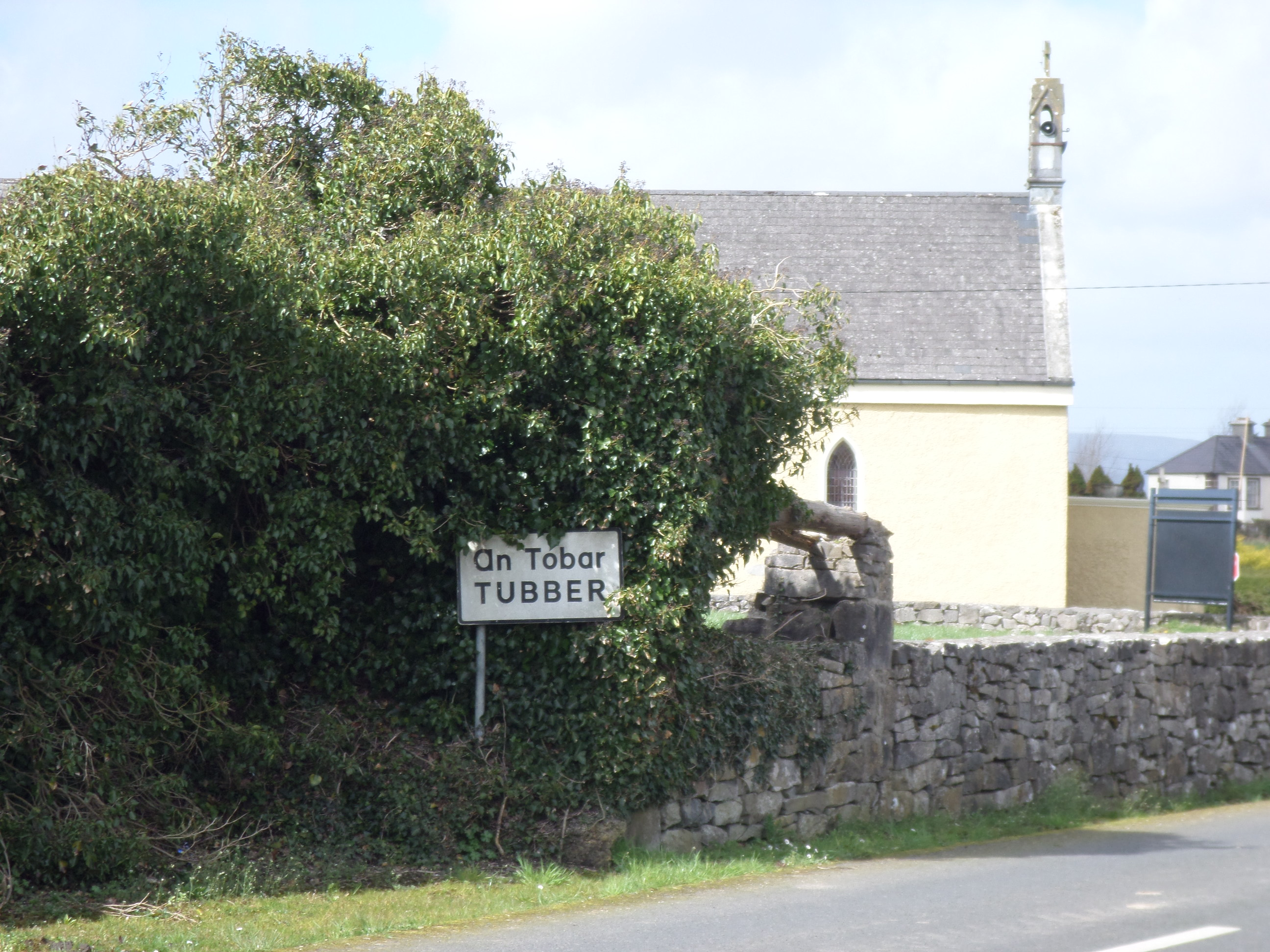
Saint Michael's church in Tubber

== Antiquities and history ==
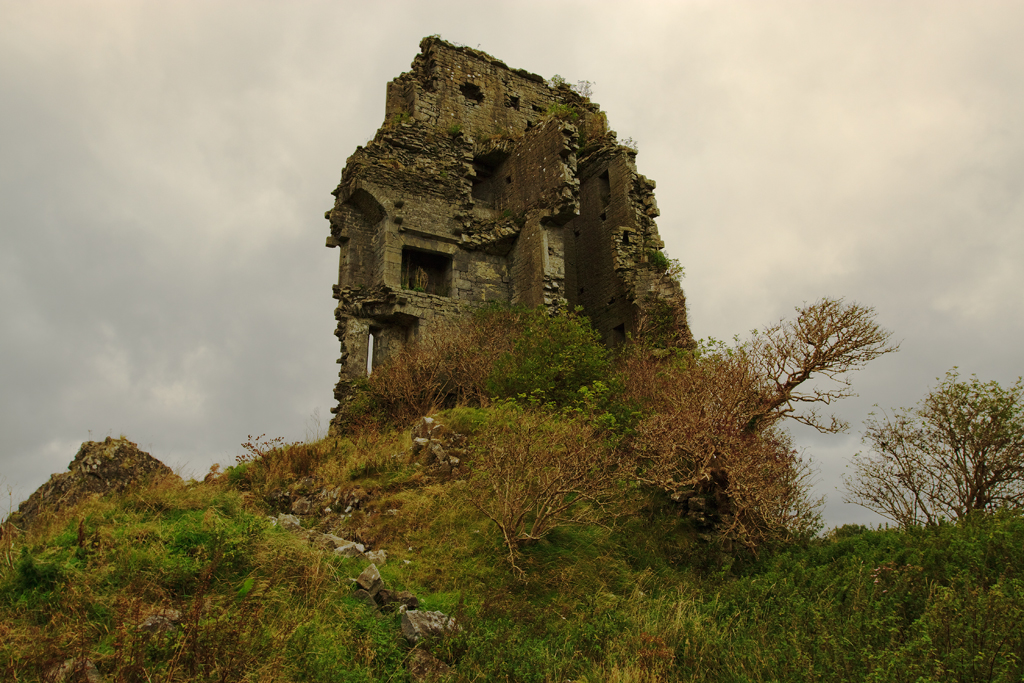
Derryowen Castle showing part of what remains of the interior

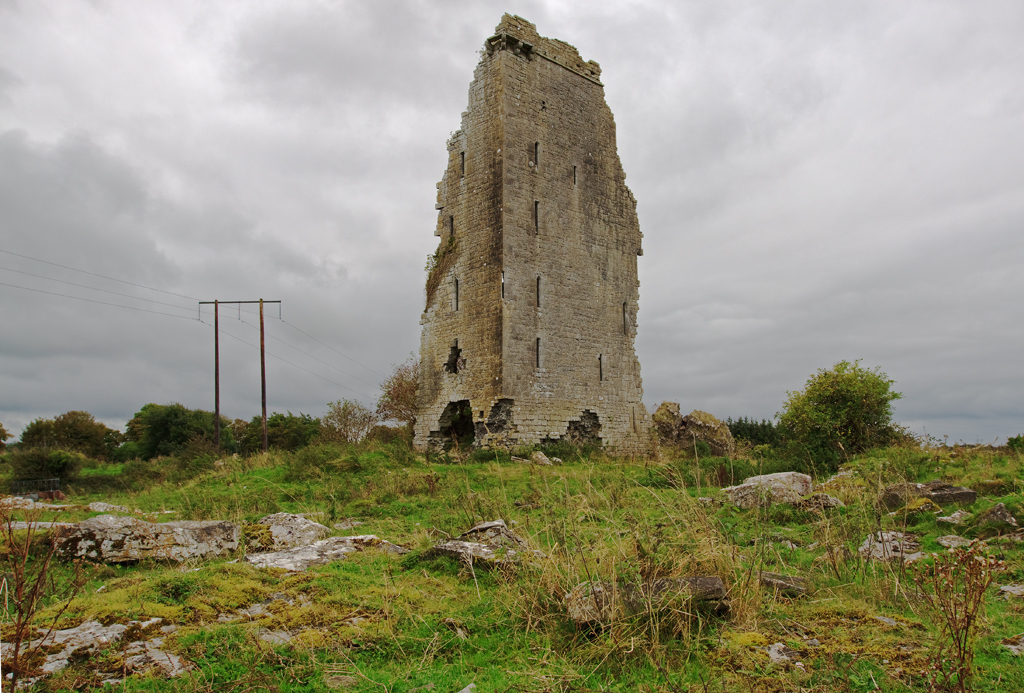
Another view of Derryowen Castle

There are no traces of the original church, which was dedicated to an obscure saint named Caoidé. His festival fell on 3 March. The remains of the later Kilkeedy church date to the 14th century. There was an old church at Kells, or Cealla in Irish, but little remains of the site. Another ruined church near Boston, surrounded by a burial ground, seems very old. In 1897 part of the east gable was still standing. The remains of other ancient churches are Templenadeirce, Cill Taice and Teampal Mor (Templemore). The Teampall na Déirce Graveyard is southeast of the Tubber-Ruan road in the townland of Shanballysallagh at 52.97475°N 8.91127°W. The ruins of the church are at the north of the cemetery. The gravestones face east.

A former Church of Ireland (Protestant) Church is located in Templebannagh townland, about 2 km northwest of the present Catholic Church. This was in use until the 1960s and then fell into disrepair. In recent years the building was restored and is now in use as The Burren Art Gallery.

The 1580 list of castles in Thomond included the following in the parish: Cloonselherney and Carrownagowle, owned by Dermot OBrien; Baunkippaun and Derryowen by the Baron of Inchiquin; Kilkeedy and Cloonduan by Mahone O’Brien, his son; and Moyree by the Earl of Thomond. In 1837 the castle at Fidane was in good condition. The Derryowen castle was a square tower 116 feet (35 m) in height with spacious rooms, but by 1837 part of it had fallen,

The people of the parish participated in the Irish Agrarian Rebellion of 1821-24. In September 1823 at Tubber fair a man named Harvey, looking for corn that had been seized for arrears of rent and then stolen from official custody, was beaten and left for dead. Around 1837 a well-attended fair was held at Turraghmore on 8 June and fairs were held at Tubber on 12 July and 20 September, mainly for cattle. In 1841 the population was 4,192 in 690 houses. The parish today has a relatively small population, with about 560 people as of 2014. The population had earlier been as high as 3,975 just before the Great Famine of 1845–52.

== Catholic parish ==
The boundaries of the Catholic parish are the same as the medieval parish of Kilkeedy. There are two churches in the parish, St Michael's in Tubber and All Saints in Boston. Both were built in 1865. The parish is in the Diocese of Killaloe.

Tubber parish is home to the Tubber GAA (Gaelic Athletic Association) club. The small hurling club is an important part of the parish life. In Clare hurling the club won the 1972 intermediate championship, the 1962 junior championship and the Clare Champion Cup in 1985. Tubber was a finalist in the 1977 under 21 hurling competition. The Tubber GAA Pitch is at Atteyslaney, Tubber.

== Townlands ==
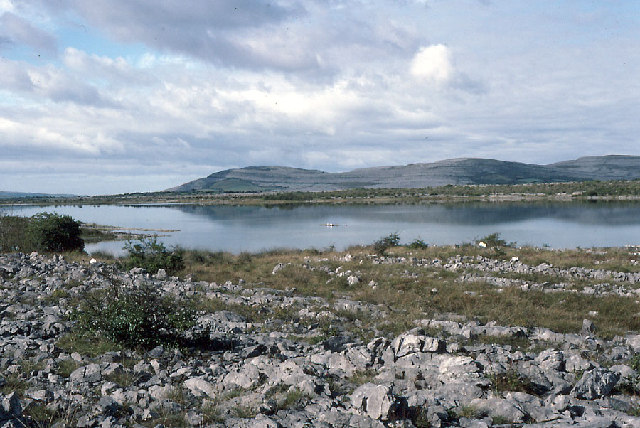
Lough Bunny, to the north of Mullaghmore

Townlands are Addergoole, Attyslany North, Attyslany South, Aughrim, Ballaghaglash, Ballybornagh, Ballinlisheen, Ballyeighter, Bouleevin, Carrowcraheen, Carrownagoul, Castlequarter, Castlequarter Kilkeedy, Cloonselherny, Coolbaun, Creggaunycahill, Cross, Culleen, Cushacorra, Derreenatloghtan, Derrylumman, Derryowen, Drumnadeevna, Garrynacallaha, Kells, Kilcorkan, Killeenmacoog North, Killeenmacoog South, Kiltacky Beg, Kiltacky More, Killourney, Knockatermon, Knockroe, Kylecreen, Leitra, Lyan, Magheranraheen or Rockforest, Monreagh, Pouleenacoona, Poulmacrih, Poulroe, Poulataggle, Quakerstown, Rinacaha, Rinroe, Rockvale, Shanballysallagh, Templebannagh, Treanmanagh, Tulla, Turkenagh and Turloughmore.

== Notable people ==
- Pat O'Connor - intercounty hurler with Tubber GAA and Clare GAA.
