= Ailbhe of Ceann Mhara =

Ailbhe of Ceann Mhara (died 814) was an Irish cleric.

== Biography ==
The Annals of the Four Masters list Ailbhe among a series of notable deaths in Ireland during the year 814.

Indrechtach, epscop Cille Mic Duach; Fergus Rátha Lúiricch, abb Fionnghlaisi; Cilleni, abb Ferna; Duibh Insi sgribhneóir Cluana Mic Nóis; Cumusccach, mac Cernaigh, fertighis Arda Macha;& Ailbhe Cinn Mara, d'ég

Which, translated, reads

Innreachtach, Bishop of Cill Mic Duach; Fearghus of Rath Luirigh, Abbot of Finnghlais;Cilleni, Abbot of Fearna; Duibhinsi, scribe of Cluain Mic Nois; Cumasgach, son of Cearnach, OEconomus of Ard Macha; and Ailbhe of Ceann Mhara, died.

Ailbhe was a cleric of the church of Coman of Kinvara, and his obituary demonstrates that a church was already in existence in Kinvara by the early 9th-century. The 11th-century text The Voyage of the Uí Chorra describes the destruction of the church, stating it was of the holy old man Coman of Kinvara.

Kinvara was situated within the territory of Uí Fiachrach Aidhne, and within a few hundred yards of the residence of King Guaire Aidne mac Colmáin of Connacht (now Dunguaire Castle). It is not known what connection Ailbhe may have had with the dynasty.
