= Nineteen Hundred and Nineteen =

1928 poem by W. B. Yeats

"Nineteen Hundred and Nineteen" is a poem by W. B. Yeats. It was included in his collection The Tower in 1928. The poem was likely influenced by Yeats’s knowledge of the 1920 killing of Eileen Quinn. In the Critical Companion to William Butler Yeats, the poem was described as "the very definition of a major poem and a reasonable nominee as Yeats's magnum opus."
