= Walter Lynch (mayor) =

Irish politician, fl. 1641–2

Walter Lynch was an Irish politician who served as Mayor of Galway, fl. 1641-1642.

Lynch was a member of one of The Tribes of Galway and served as Mayor during the outbreak of the Irish Confederate Wars. British troops stationed at Forthill garrison, overlooking the town, frequently fired cannon and shot upon the town. On the night of 13 March 1642 they set fire to all the house in the town's east suburbs. This led to the capture of a naval ship anchored just off Galway early on the morning of 19 March by the townsmen, the town gates being closed and the inhabitants declaring open hostilities against the garrison. With the Earl of Clanricarde as a mediator, Lynch ensured that the garrison ceased bombarding the town.

However, hostilities re-erupted soon after, with the garrison capturing and hanging three townspeople in full view of the inhabitants. Letters from the Mayor indicate that he may not have been fully in control of the town council or population at this time, as assaults and murders occurred within the town, while the Confederate lawyers, Patrick D'Arcy and Richard Martyn led a faction in apparent opposition to Lynch. He was succeeded in September by Richard Martyn, who oversaw the successful siege of Forthill, which surrendered in June 1643.

Civic offices
Preceded by Francis Blake	Mayor of Galway; 1641–1642	Succeeded by Richard Martyn
