= Kiltartan =

Barony and civil parish in County Galway, Ireland

Kiltartan Cill Tartan (Irish)
- Barony
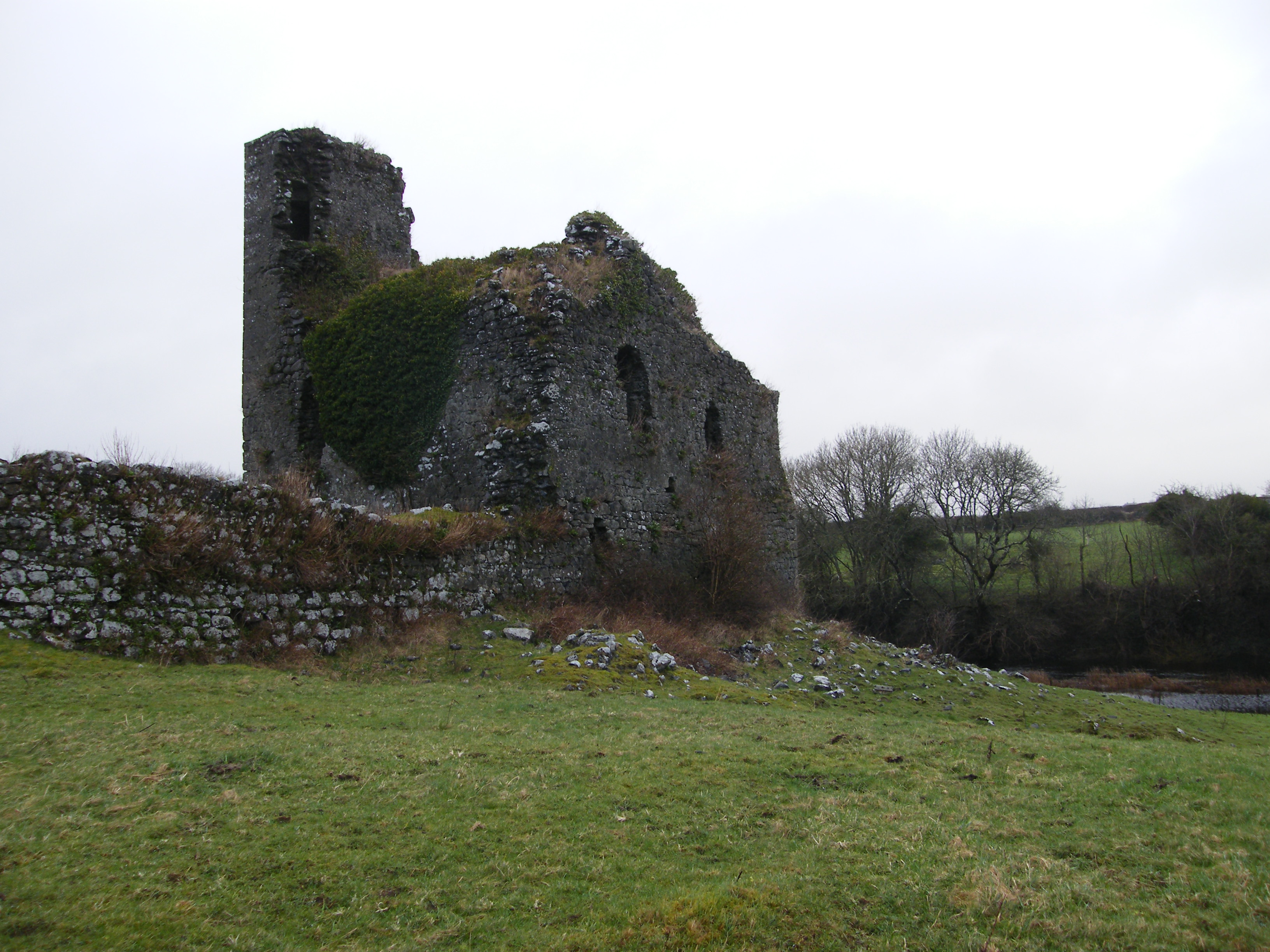
- Kiltartan Castle

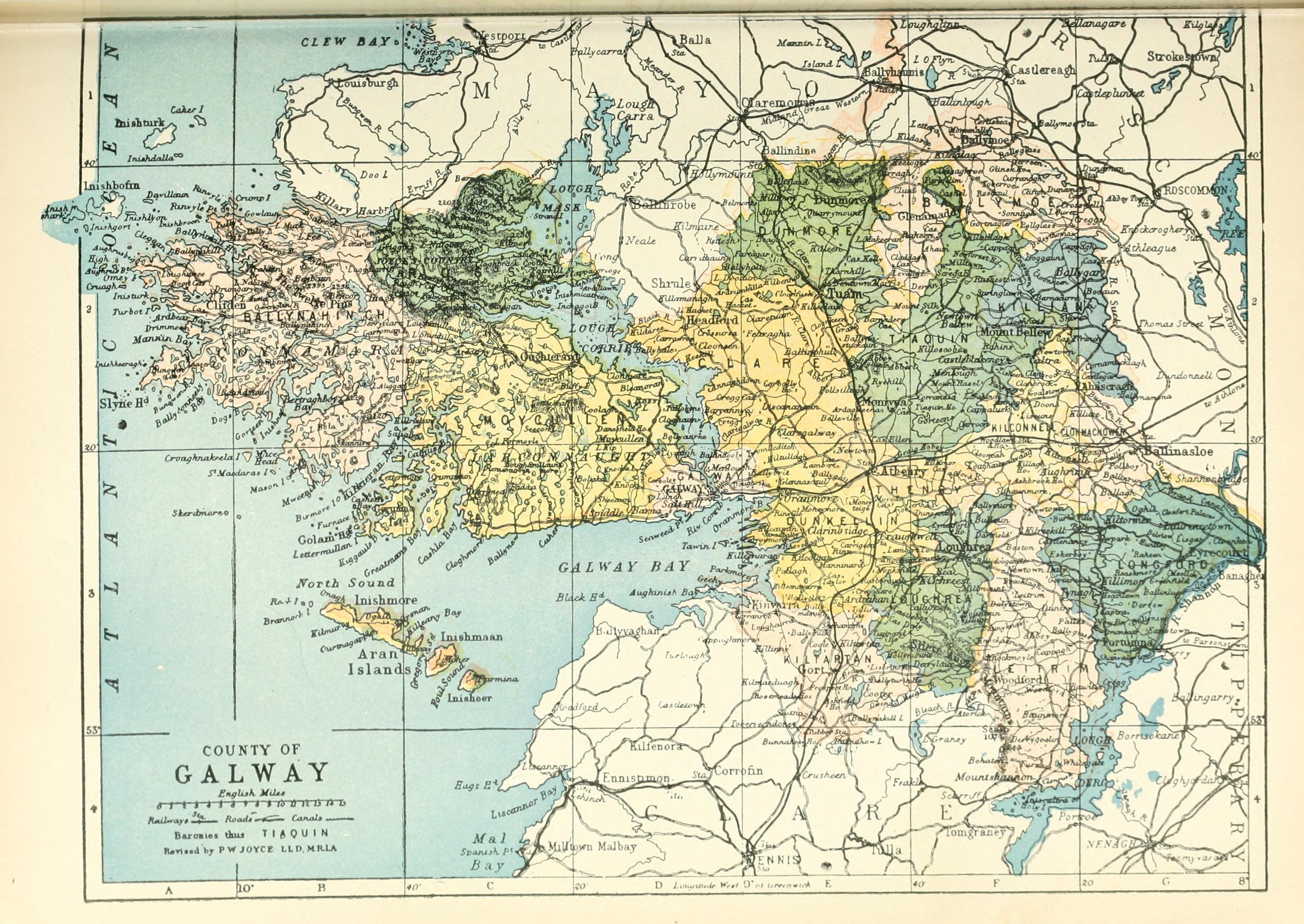
- Barony map of County Galway, 1900; Kiltartan is in the south, coloured pink.

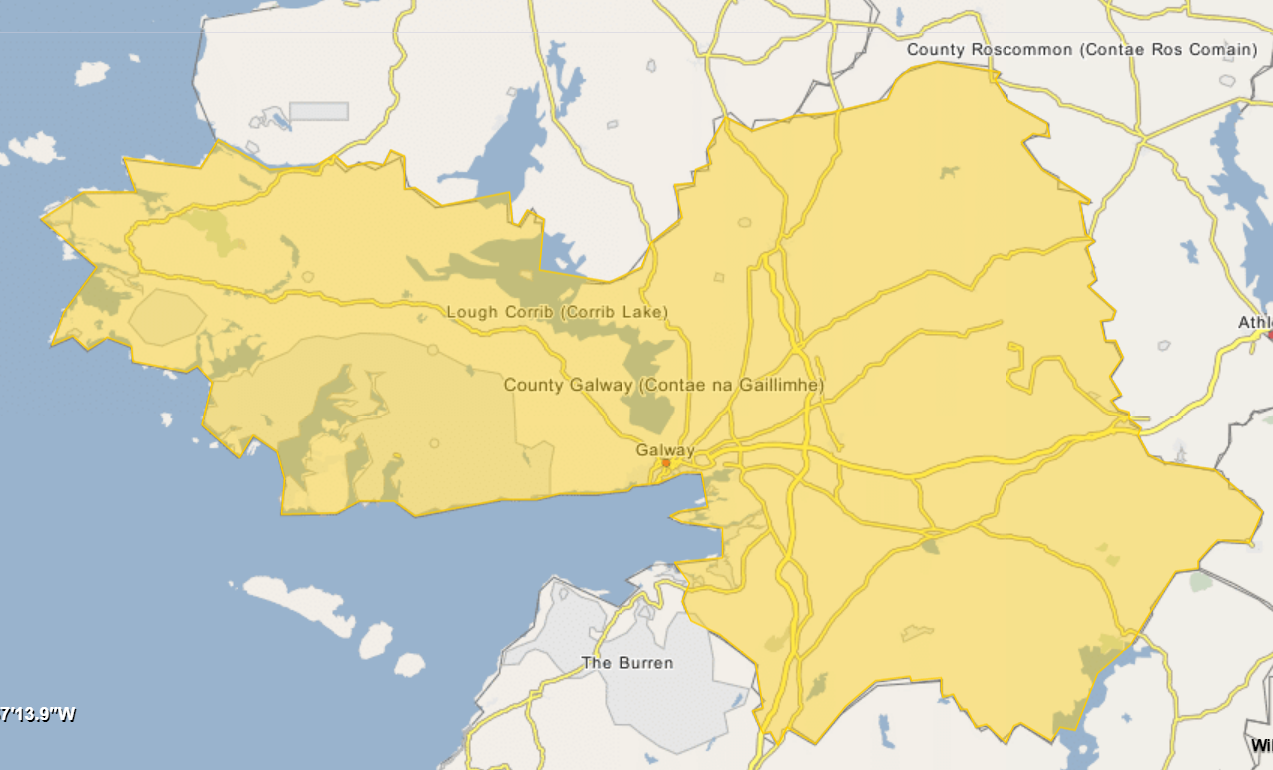
- Location within County Galway
- Coordinates: 53°07′N 8°53′W
- Sovereign state: Ireland
- Province: Connacht
- County: Galway

Area
  - Total: 265.7 km^{2} (102.6 sq mi)

Kiltartan (Irish: Cill Tartan) is a barony and civil parish in County Galway, Ireland. The southern portion of this barony was formerly known as Cenél Áeda na hEchtge or O'Shaughnessy's Country, the northern portion was called Coill Ua bhFiachrach (the territory of the Hynes clan) and the eastern part was called Oireacht Réamoinn (Mac Redmonds clan, a branch of the Burkes). It was the home of Lady Gregory, Edward Martyn, and a regular residence of W. B. Yeats. The barony takes its name from the Burke stronghold of Kiltartan Castle (now ruinous) also known as Castletown or Ballycastle. The castle in turn takes its name from the medieval church of Kiltartan a short distance to the north. The old Irish name for the church and parish was Cill Athrachta (church of St. Attracta) which was corrupted to Cill Tortain. The older anglicised form was Kiltaraght which is closer to the original Irish form.

It is referenced in Yeats's poem "An Irish Airman Foresees His Death".

== See also ==
- Augusta, Lady Gregory
