= Coill Ua bhFiachrach =

Killovyeragh or Coill Ua bh-Fiachrach (meaning- wood of the Uí Fiachrach) was a sub division of the Uí Fiachrach Aidhne roughly coextensive with, but larger than, the parish of Kinvara in the south of County Galway, in the west of Ireland. The Ó hEidhin clan were chiefs of this district from about the 10th century up until the mid 17th century. It covered the northern portion of the barony of Kiltartan. The name was still in use in the mid 19th century as recorded by John O'Donovan in his Ordnance Survey letters.
