= Lough Bunny =

Freshwater lake in The Burren, County Clare, Ireland

- Loch Buinne (Irish)
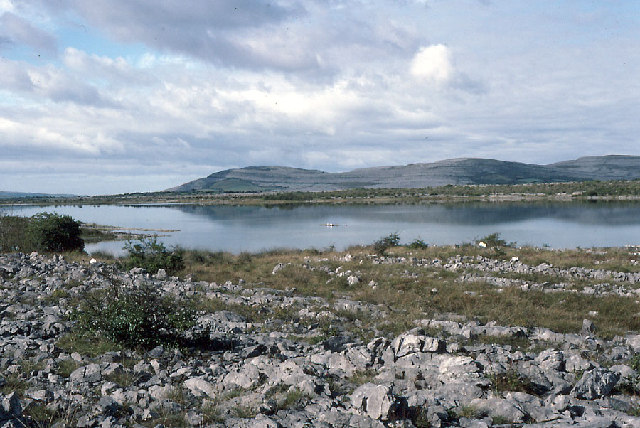

- Location in Ireland
- Location: County Clare
- Coordinates: 53°1′19″N 8°55′29″W
- Catchment area: 9.32 km^{2} (3.6 sq mi)
- Basin countries: Ireland
- Max. length: 2.4 km (1.5 mi)
- Max. width: 0.6 km (0.4 mi)
- Surface area: 1.03 km^{2} (0.40 sq mi)
- Average depth: 2.7 m (8 ft 10 in)
- Max. depth: 14 m (46 ft)
- Surface elevation: 17 m (56 ft)
- Islands: Puskada Island, Gull Island

Lough Bunny (Irish: Loch Buinne, meaning 'lake of the flood') is a freshwater lake in the Burren, County Clare, Ireland.

== Geography ==
Lough Bunny measures about 2 km (1.2 mi) long and 0.5 km (0.3 mi) wide. It lies about 10 km (6 mi) southwest of Gort near the village of Boston.

== Hydrology ==
Lough Bunny has no permanent inflow or outflow. It is fed by springs and drains into fissures around the lake's northern end. The lake is oligotrophic.

== Natural history ==
Fish species in Lough Bunny include perch, rudd, pike and the critically endangered European eel.

== Administration ==
The lake lies within the jurisdiction of Clare County Council, and is within the Mid-West Region of Ireland. Lough Bunny is within the Burren and Cliffs of Moher Geopark, the Burren National Park, and the East Burren Complex Special Area of Conservation, overseen by the National Parks and Wildlife Service.

== See also ==
- List of loughs in Ireland
