= Kiltartan Castle =

- Caisleán Chill Tartan (Irish)
- Castletown Castle
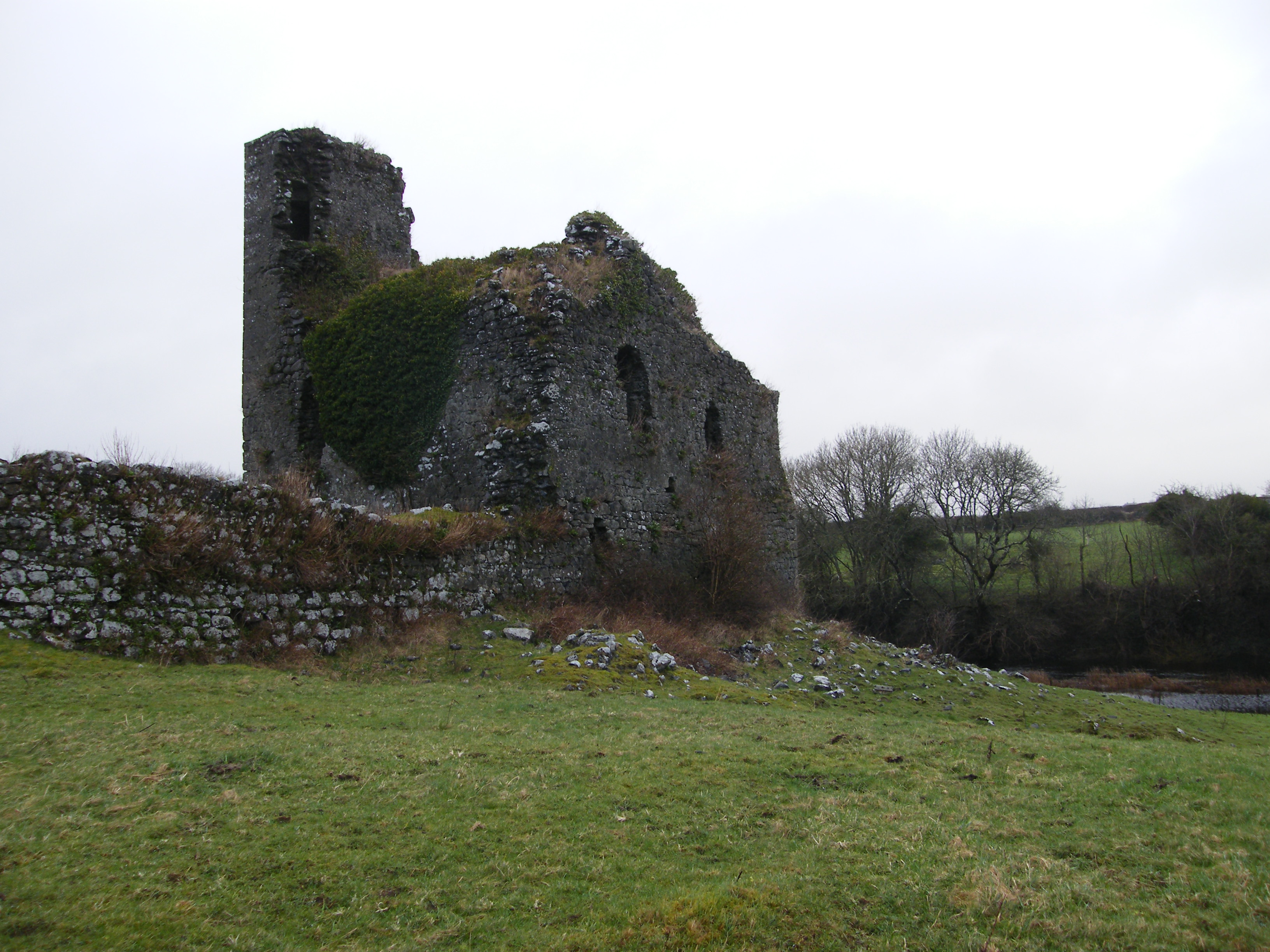
- Ruin of Kiltartan Castle

- Location within Ireland
- 53.090549°N 8.807749°W
- Type: tower house
- Location: Castletown, Gort, County Galway, Ireland

History
- Built: 1280s

Site notes
- Owner: State

National monument of Ireland
- Official name: Kiltartan Castle
- Reference no.: 259

Kiltartan Castle is a tower house and National Monument located in County Galway, Ireland.

== Location ==
Kiltartan Castle lies in the civil parish of Kiltartan. It is 2.8 kilometres (1 3/4 miles) north of Gort, on the west bank of the Gort River.

== History ==
The tower house was built in the 1280s, during the reign of Edward I as Lord of Ireland.

It was ruined in the 1650s during the Cromwellian conquest.

== Description ==
Two storeys partially remain, with a three-storey spiral stairway and numerous arrowslits.
