= Boston, County Clare =

Village in County Clare, Ireland

Boston Móinín na gCloigeann (Irish)
- Village
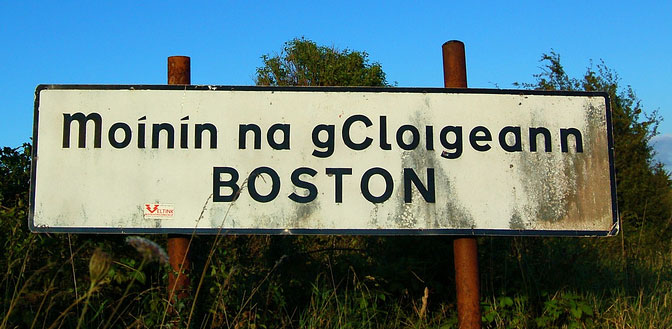
- Irish/English bilingual sign for Boston

- Location in Ireland
- Coordinates: 53°01′51″N 8°55′54″W
- Country: Ireland
- Province: Munster
- County: County Clare
- Time zone: UTC+0 (WET)
  - Summer (DST): UTC-1 (IST (WEST))

Boston (Irish: Boston or Móinín na gCloigeann 'little bog of the skulls'; formerly Druim na Doimhne 'ridge of the abyss') is a village in north County Clare, Ireland. It is situated near Lough Bunny, off the R460 road from Corofin to Gort, at the northeastern edge of the Burren National Park, and close to the border with County Galway. It is at the intersection of the townlands of Kylecreen, Drumnadeevna, and Rockvale, which are in the civil parish of Kilkeedy.

== Names ==
The name "Boston" is most likely to have been an ironic reference to the city of Boston in the United States, applied as a nickname to what was described in 1839 as "a few cabins situated on the property of the Marquis of Thomond". The official Irish-language name recorded in the Placenames Database of Ireland is Boston. The electoral division containing the village is also named Boston in both English and Irish, although a 1929 Act of the Oireachtas gives the Irish name Druim na Doimhne "ridge of the abyss". Local signposts erected by Clare County Council use the Irish name Móinín na gCloigeann "little bog of the skulls", which appears to be a mistaken transfer from a different place: a townland called "Moneennagliggin North" or "Boston" in English, near Cratloe in the south of the county.

== History ==
The ruins of Cluain Dubháin Castle and Skaghard Castle can be found by Lough Bunny. Today, the ruins of the castle are a reminder of the past sieges endured by its previous occupants. Mahon O'Brien defended the castle for three months, before being killed by a musket ball during a siege of the castle laid by Richard Bingham in 1586.

In 1846 Boston was described as the "principal hamlet" of Kilkeedy, although Tubber, County Clare now spills over into the far end of the parish.
