= Kilkeedy =

Catholic parish in County Clare, Ireland

- Roman Catholic parish
- Location in Ireland
- Coordinates: 52°59′24″N 8°53′39″W
- Country: Ireland
- Province: Munster
- County: County Clare
- Time zone: UTC+0 (WET)
  - Summer (DST): UTC-1 (IST (WEST))

Kilkeedy is a parish in County Clare, Ireland, and part of the Roman Catholic Diocese of Killaloe. The parish is the only parish in said diocese whose boundaries are still identical compared with the namesake civil parish.

As of 2021, the co-parish priests are Damien Nolan and Pat O'Neil.

The main church of the parish is the Church of St. Michaels in Tubber, completed in 1865.

The second church of the parish is the "Church of All Saints" in Boston. This church was also built in 1865 but it replaced an older limestone church with a thatched roof. That church was in its turn a replacement for a masshouse in the townland Kylcreen.

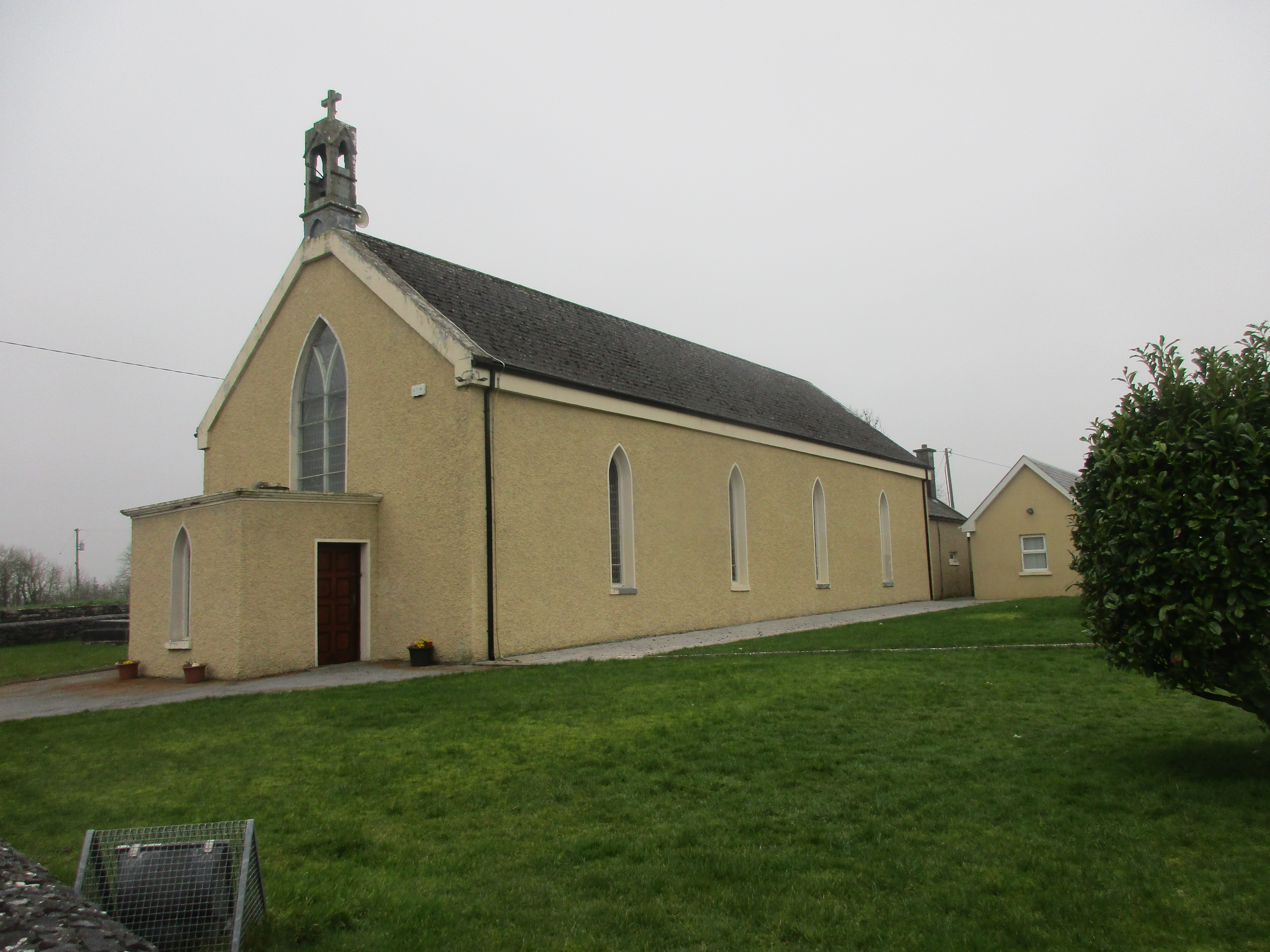
Outside Church of St. Michaels in Tubber

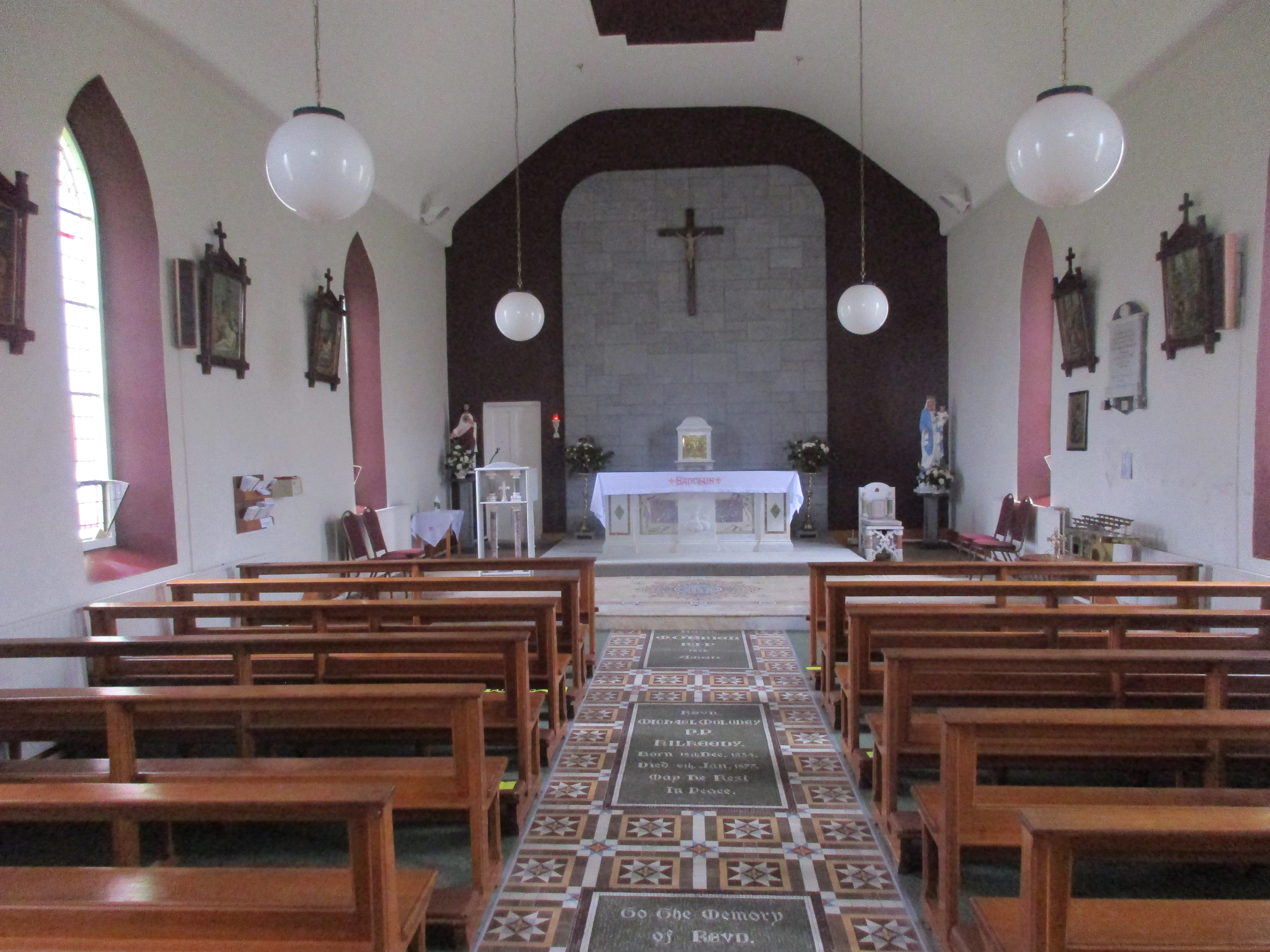
Inside Tubber church

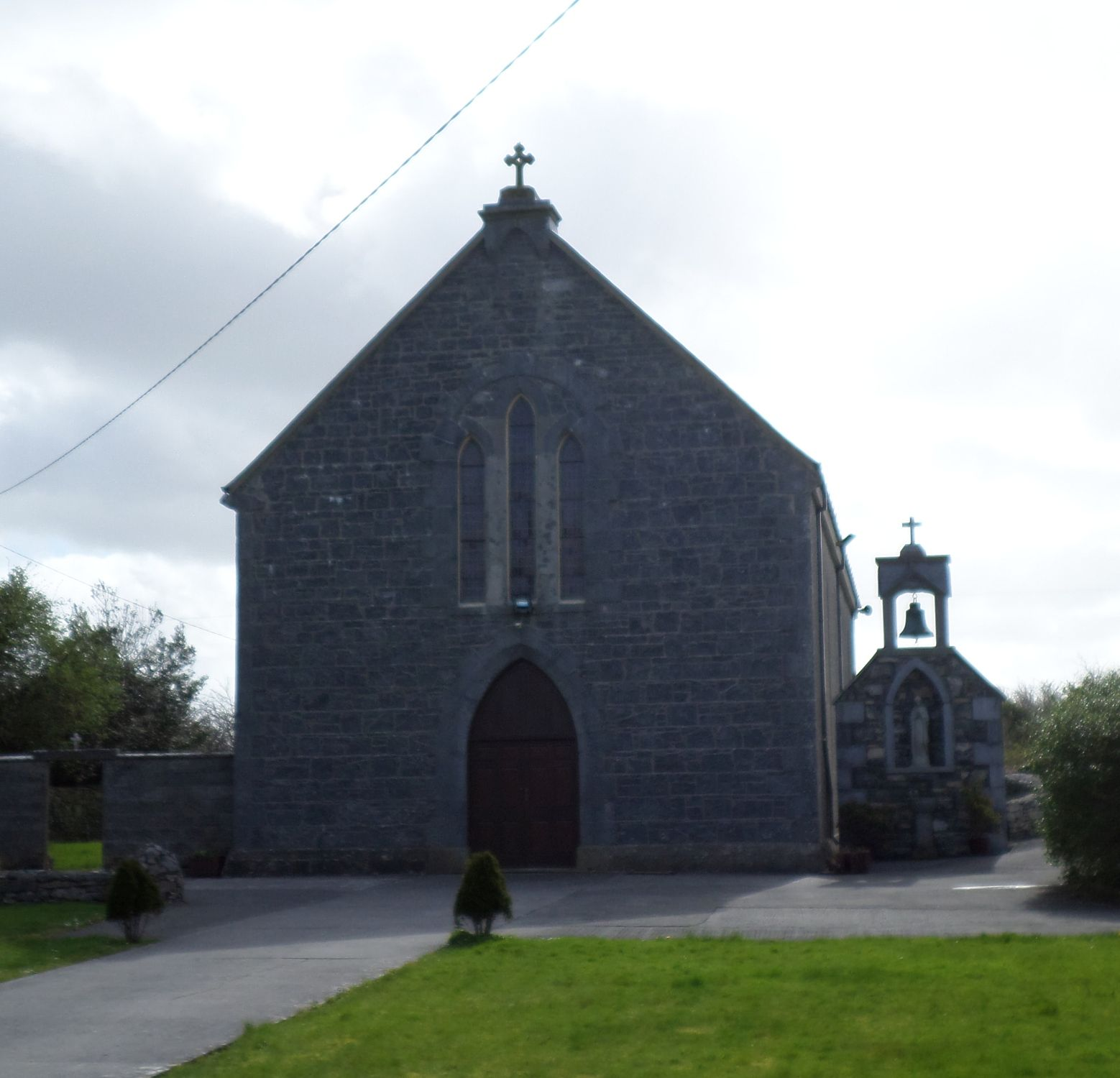
Church of All Saints in Boston

== Early Monastic sites ==
There is evidence of multiple churches in the area, mostly in the names of townlands like Kells (Cealla, meaning cells or churches), Kilcornan (Church of St. Cornan) and Killeenmacoog (Church of McHugh). No traces of the churches are left or records are left of these churches.

Only two early monastic sites have survived: the one in the townland Cross and the one in the townland Kiltackey More.

Cross

The townland Cross contains the ruins of Kilkeedy Church or Church of St. Caoide (or St. Keedy). No records of this saint are known but his feast day was celebrated on 3 March. The present ruin is not the original, as it mostly 14th century. Attached to the surviving nave is a side chapel from a later date with a plaque dated 1706. An aerial photo shows a much larger circular enclosure then the present one, that dates from 1934/1935.Keane, Deirdre. "A History of Kilkeedy Church and Graveyard". Clare County Library.

Kiltackey More

This townland contains the remains of the church of St. Taisce, a saint lost in history. Only a small fragment of the church is still in existence but the adjoining graveyard is in active use.

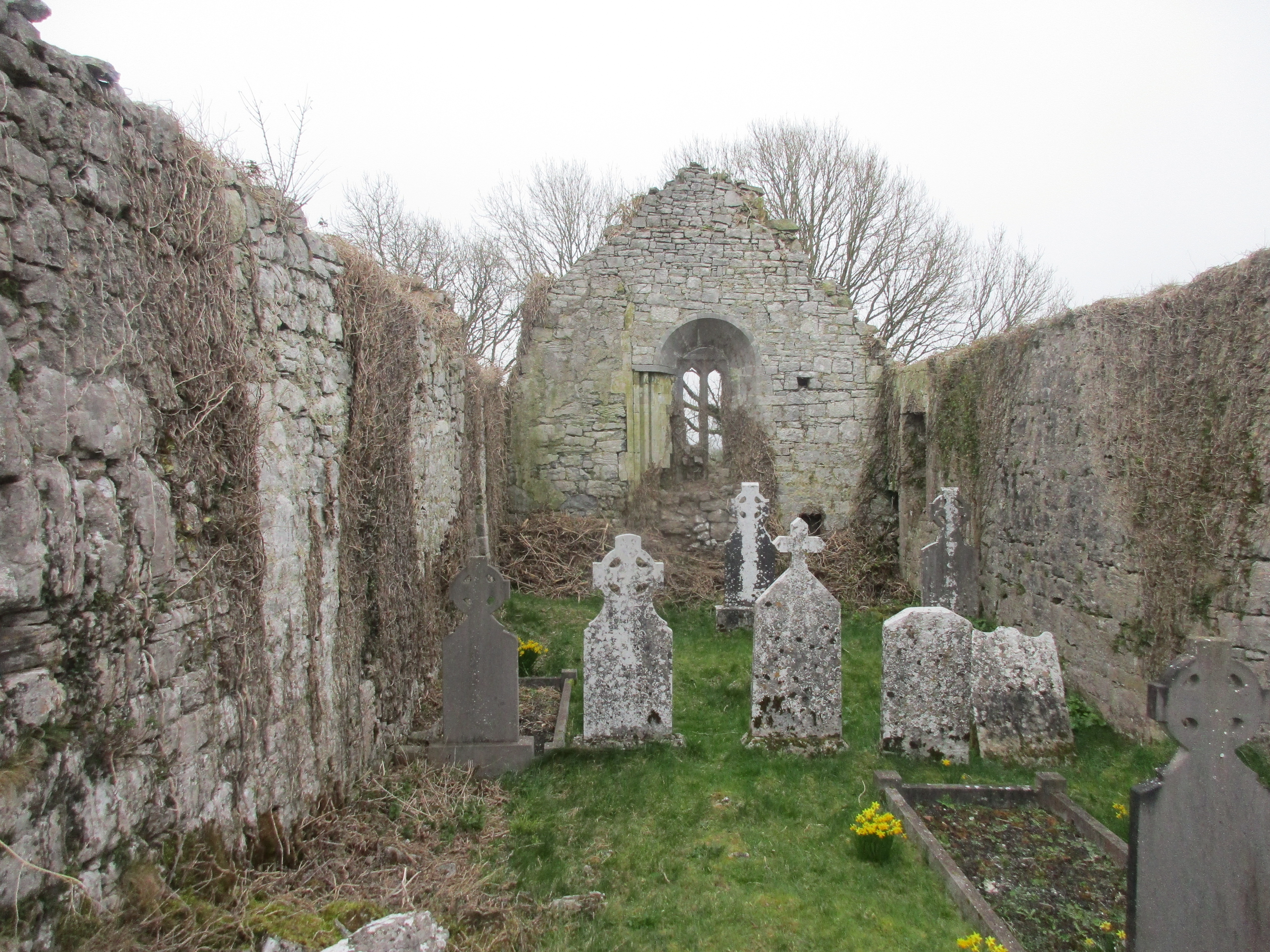
The nave of the 14th century ruins in Kilkeedy Church

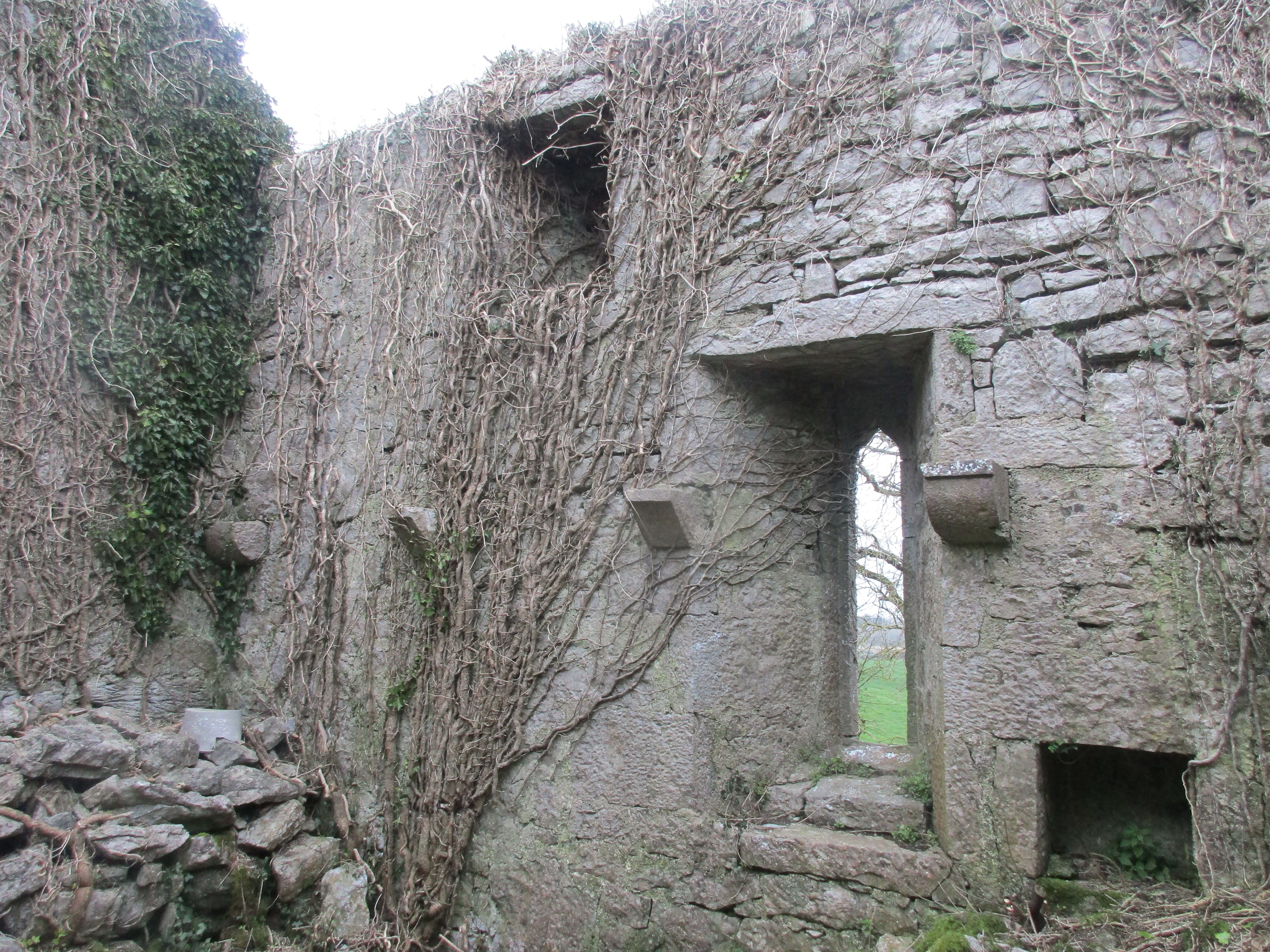
The two storey side chapel of Kilkeedy Church (see the corbels)

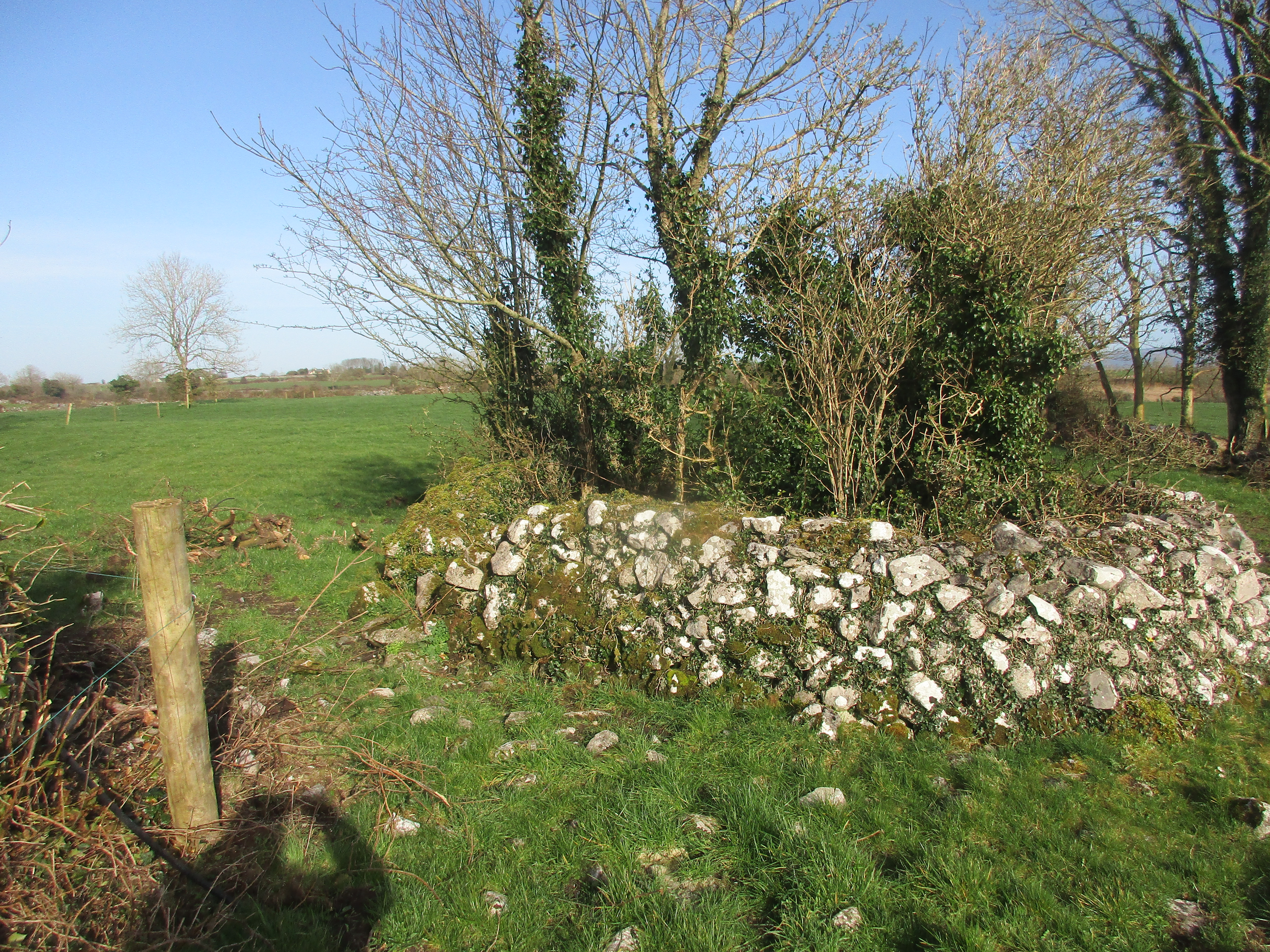
The now dry Holy Well adjacent to the site

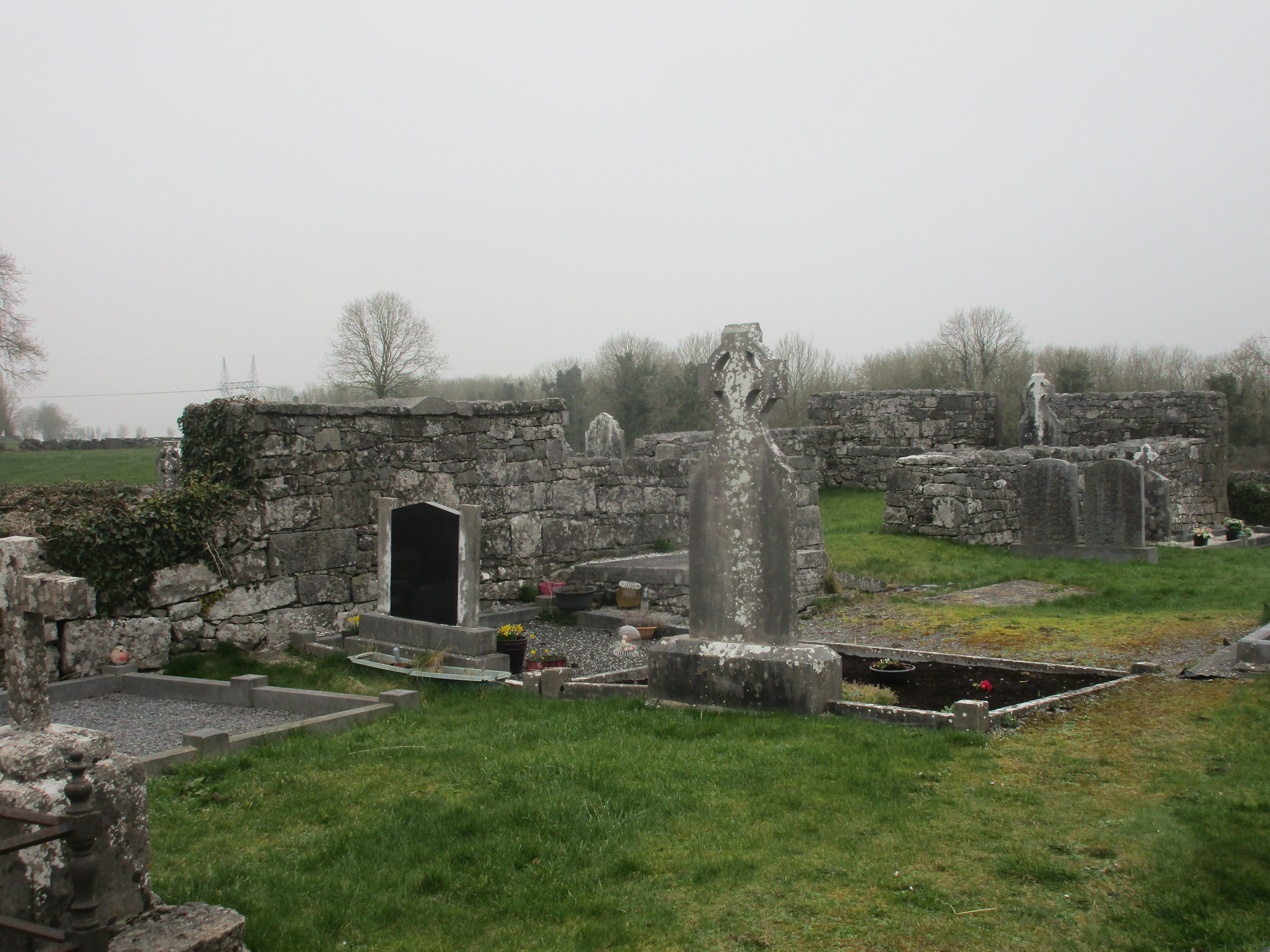
The remains of Kiltacky Church amidst the graveyard
