= Ferenc Martyn =

Hungarian artist and sculptor

Ferenc Martyn (1899 – 1986) was an artist and sculptor, Hungarian-born descendant of the Martyn tribe of County Galway, descended from the same branch of the Tribe as Edward Martyn of Tullira (1859 – 1923). His great-grandfather and brothers had settled in the Austro-Hungarian Empire by 1804 where they were employed as soldiers. Ferenc himself fought on the Italian front during World War I, but subsequently made his home in Paris. He returned to Hungary in 1940 where he died in 1986.
