= Edward Martyn =

Irish playwright and activist

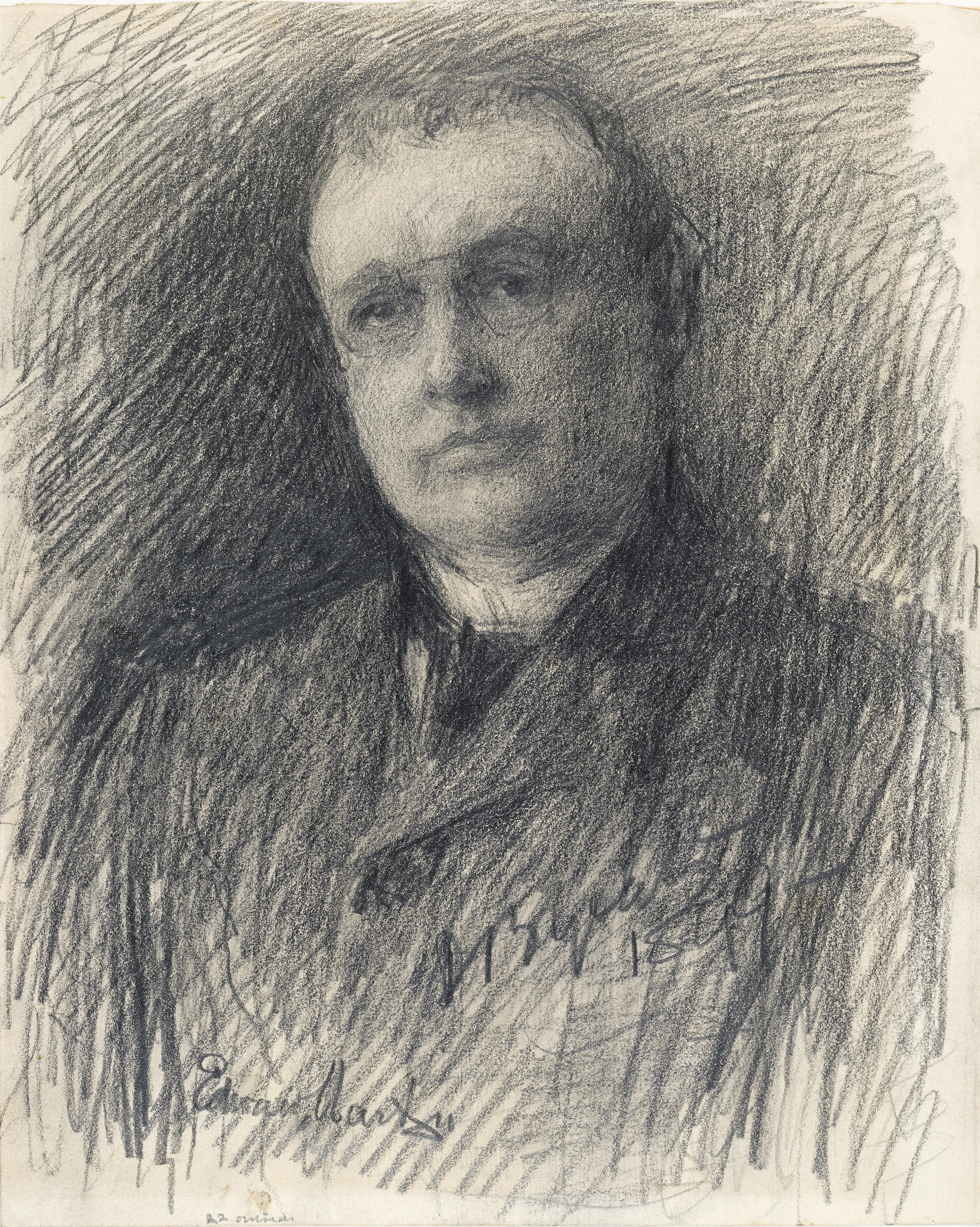
- drawing by John Butler Yeats, 1899

President of Sinn Féin
- In office 1905–1908
- Preceded by: Creation of Office
- Succeeded by: John Sweetman

Personal details
- Born: 30 January 1859
- Died: 5 December 1923 (aged 64) Tullira, County Galway, Ireland
- Relatives: John Martyn and Annie Mary Josephine Smyth (parents)
- Education: Belvedere College
- Alma mater: Wimbledon College
- Occupation: Playwright

Edward Martyn (30 January 1859 – 5 December 1923) was an Irish playwright, arts patron and nationalist politician. He served as the first president of Sinn Féin from 1905 to 1908, and was a co-founder of the Irish Literary Theatre, the Feis Ceoil and the stained-glass studio An Túr Gloine. Though his own dramatic output was modest, his financial generosity and cultural activism shaped many of the defining institutions of the Irish Literary Revival.

== Early life ==
Martyn was born on 30 January 1859 at his mother's family home at Masonbrook, Loughrea, County Galway, the elder of two sons of Anne Martyn (née Smith; d. 1898) and John Martyn (d. 1860), of Tulira Castle, Ardrahan, County Galway. His father died when Martyn was a small boy, and he was raised entirely by his mother. He was educated at Belvedere College, Dublin, and Beaumont College, Windsor, both Jesuit schools. In May 1877 he matriculated at Christ Church, Oxford, but left in 1879 without taking a degree, later describing himself as largely self-educated. He was influenced there by the fashion for the writing of Walter Pater, which encouraged his appreciation for Catholic ritual and ancient Greek culture. His only sibling, John, died in 1883. On returning to Galway, Martyn set about rebuilding much of Tulira Castle in neo-Gothic style, employing the architect George Ashlin. He spent £20,000 that had accumulated during his minority on this project, though for most of his life he left the Gothic sections unoccupied and lived an ascetic existence in the castle's tower. He installed an organ in the main hall, on which he regularly played Palestrina. As a young landlord, Martyn took his place on the Grand Jury and served as a local magistrate and Deputy Lieutenant of County Galway. His land agent was shot at on the high road from Gort, and for a time Martyn himself was under police protection.

== Patron of the arts ==
Martyn began writing fiction and plays in the 1880s. While his own output was by general consensus undistinguished, he acquired a well-earned reputation as a noted connoisseur of music, both European classical and Irish traditional. He used his wealth extensively to benefit Irish culture. His activities and sponsorships included:

- foundation of the Palestrina Choir (the resident choir at the St Mary's Pro-Cathedral, Dublin) in 1903 In a critical essay published in 1895, Martyn had argued that Palestrina could be considered the real predecessor of Wagner in the reform of church music, a conviction that underpinned his later endowment of the choir.
- funding and direction of St. Brendan's Cathedral, Loughrea
- co-founder and endowing of the Feis Ceoil in 1897 His ambition was for the Feis Ceoil to become the Irish equivalent of the Welsh Eisteddfod; he also organised a society of pipers in Dublin whose Monday evening rehearsals he attended regularly.
- president of Na hAisteoirí, the Irish-language drama group
- sponsored and guided An Túr Gloine, Ireland's first stained-glass workshop
- sponsored the Irish Theatre, Thomas MacDonagh's theatre (1914–1916) presenting European and Irish-language work in Countess Plunkett's hall in Hardwicke Street

He also donated several significant paintings to the National Gallery of Ireland, including works by Degas, Monet, Corot and Utamaro, as well as works by William Leech and Jack B. Yeats.

== George Moore ==
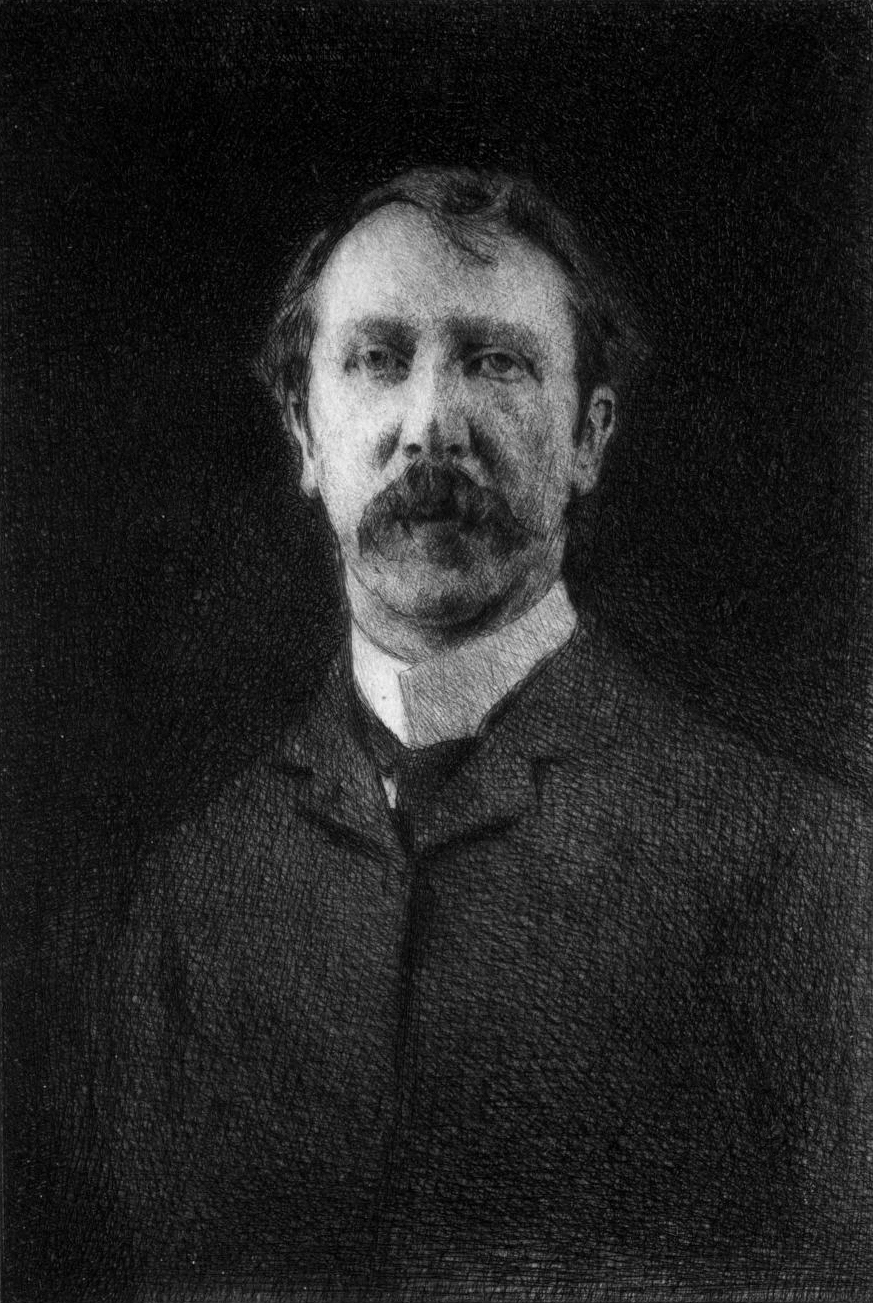
George Moore, circa 1880s

Martyn was a cousin and close associate of the novelist George Moore (1852–1933), and the two had known each other from childhood. Both lifelong bachelors, they made frequent trips together to France and Germany in the 1880s and 1890s. Moore fostered Martyn's interest in modern art, which resulted in the latter purchasing works by Degas, Monet, Corot and Utamaro. In return, Martyn introduced Moore to Wagner; the two attended performances of the Ring Cycle at Bayreuth together. Their relationship was often antagonistic. Moore wrote an account of Martyn in his memoir Hail and Farewell (1911–14), which Martyn's first biographer Denis Gwynn described as both insightful and "somewhat cruel". Martyn responded with a caricature of Moore in his play The Dream Physician, and listed "Mr George Augustus Moore" under "recreations" in Who's Who. Moore did not share Martyn's Fenian ideas or his acceptance of violent means to achieve national sovereignty, and the cousins' political differences eventually drove their friendship apart; in later years they were no longer on speaking terms.

== The Irish Literary Theatre ==
In August 1896, William Butler Yeats paid his first visit to Tulira Castle, where he met Lady Gregory for the first time in Ireland (they had met briefly once in London). Lady Gregory subsequently invited him to Coole Park, where their artistic collaboration began. The three went on to found the Irish Literary Theatre. Martyn underwrote the cost of the company's first three seasons, which proved crucial to establishing the company and the future of the Abbey Theatre. The inaugural season in 1899 opened with Yeats's The Countess Cathleen and Martyn's own The Heather Field, the latter proving popular with audiences. The project nearly collapsed when Martyn threatened to withdraw his support over theological objections to The Countess Cathleen, which had been criticised as heretical; Yeats and Lady Gregory had to obtain priestly reassurances before he relented.

Differences soon opened between Martyn and his collaborators. In 1900, the society staged his Maeve and a play entitled The Bending of the Bough, credited to Moore, which was in fact a radical rewrite of Martyn's A Tale of a Town; Martyn refused to have his name attached to the revised work. A further source of conflict was Moore's claim to retrospective credit for The Heather Field. More fundamentally, Martyn, a disciple of Ibsen and European realist drama, deplored Yeats's preference for peasant plays, while Yeats regarded Ibsen-influenced drama as neither poetic nor heroic. Martyn eventually departed, going on to found a players' club at the Queen's Theatre, then the Theatre of Ireland (1906), and finally the Irish Theatre (1914) at Hardwicke Street with MacDonagh and Plunkett. He remained the principal source of funding throughout. These ventures staged works by European masters including Ibsen, Chekhov and Strindberg, as well as new Irish talent such as Patrick Pearse and Eimar O'Duffy. He later regretted his parting with Yeats and Gregory, but remained on warm terms with Lady Gregory until the end of his life.

== Republicanism ==
Martyn was descended from Richard Óge Martyn (c. 1604–1648), a leading Irish Confederate, and Oliver Óge Martyn (c. 1630 – c. 1709), a Jacobite who fought in the Williamite War in Ireland. Yet by his lifetime the family were unionists, and as a young man Martyn conformed fully to the orthodox views of Irish landlordism.

His outlook began to change in the 1880s after studying Irish history, including the works of W. E. H. Lecky, as well as living through the events of the Irish Land War. The Boer War further accentuated his nationalist views. He came out publicly as an Irish republican when he refused to allow "God Save the Queen" (or Rudyard Kipling's "The Absent-Minded Beggar") to be performed after a dinner party at Tulira, and subsequently resigned his positions as Justice of the Peace and Deputy Lieutenant for County Galway in 1900.By this stage he was involved with the political work of Maud Gonne and Arthur Griffith. In 1903 he served as chairman of the People's Protection Committee, which protested against the visit of Edward VII to Dublin. In 1904 he funded the publication of Griffith's The Resurrection of Hungary. He was the first president of Sinn Féin from 1905 to 1908 (the party did not take "Sinn Féin" as its official title until 1908). He became close friends with Griffith throughout this period.

In 1906, he was at the centre of a well-publicised court case after making an off-the-cuff remark that any Irishman who joined the British Army should be flogged. This led to his suspension by the Kildare Street Club, of which he was a member. The case was resolved in his favour; Martyn stated that he had pursued it only to retain membership, as the club served the best caviar in Dublin. In 1908, Martyn resigned from Sinn Féin and from politics in general to concentrate on writing and his other cultural activities. As Sinn Féin became radicalised after the Easter Rising, his own views remained moderate; he supported the establishment of the Irish Convention in 1917 and the Anglo-Irish Treaty of 1921.

He was on close personal terms with Thomas MacDonagh, Joseph Mary Plunkett and Patrick Pearse, and deeply mourned their executions in the aftermath of the Easter Rising. On the deaths of MacDonagh and Plunkett, he said: "It is such an awful thought, such talents and high ideals gone, only the jobbers and politicians are left. Everything is in ruins in Ireland". Among the later pupils of Martyn's theatrical ventures were Jimmy O'Dea and Micheál Mac Liammóir. A parish hall and church that he had founded at Labane, near Tulira, were burned by the Black and Tans in 1920.

== Personal life ==
Martyn never married. His mother made persistent and unceasing attempts to find him a suitable wife, all of which he resisted. Both George Moore and W. B. Yeats suggested that he was a celibate homosexual. In a novel and several short stories, Moore created a series of repressed gay men who were widely understood as thinly disguised versions of Martyn. His biographer Denis Gwynn described him as a misogynist who resisted all attempts to "turn his philosophical abode into a temple of Hymen". The condition he attached to his endowment of the Palestrina Choir (that no woman should sing in it) was noted by contemporaries as consistent with this aspect of his character.

== Death ==
Martyn died at Tulira Castle on 5 December 1923, aged 64, after years of ill health stemming from a progressively worsening rheumatic disorder, which had left him largely confined to a wheelchair in his final years. Friends and family were shocked by a provision in his will directing that his body be donated for the use of medical science and, after dissection, be buried in an unmarked pauper's grave. The provision was in fact the fulfilment of a resolution he had formed very early in his life; even during his mother's lifetime, his first will had contained the same stipulation. He was buried at Glasnevin Cemetery and the Palestrina Choir sang at his graveside. Mischievously, he left the rights to The Heather Field and A Tale of a Town to George Moore, with whom relations had remained tempestuous to the last.

His papers he bequeathed to the Carmelites of Clarendon Street in Dublin, who subsequently misplaced and lost them. Portraits of Martyn exist by, among others, John Butler Yeats and Sarah Purser, with a further portrait by Norman French McLachlan held at the National Gallery of Ireland. On his death, the senior line of the Martyn family died out. His property passed to a cousin, Robert Smith, and Tulira was subsequently sold.

== Extracts from Lady Gregory's Journals ==
- Sunday 25 September 1921 (pp. 294–95) – And in the afternoon we drove to Tillyra, and Edward sent them [Anne and Catherine, Lady Gregory's granddaughters] into the Castle with Owen, and let them play the organ in the hall and gave us tea and was very pleasant, thought Catherine very like Velasquez's Prince on horseback; approves of my keeping on Coole but thinks I have great courage. He is not very hopeful of a settlement, but he is never hopeful, but he praises the leaders, De V. and McNeill and Barton especially. And indeed one feels more pride in being represented by them in England than by the British Cabinet in Europe! He says George Moore is really angry about Miss Mitchell's life of him, and told him "Boyd is to do the official life"; but Edward says "that will make no difference, Miss Mitchell's will always be the real one accepted, she took the only possible way of dealing with you, treating you as Mon ami Moore. Edward is sorry he didn't build a Theatre twenty years ago, and "put the key in his pocket." ... He is anxious about money, has fears of his investment in the English railways, and is very crippled with rheumatism.
- 14 January 1922 (pp. 323–324) – On the way to the Abbey Theatre, over the Bridge, there was a great crowd, I asked what was going on and a young man said "It's the Tans ... – on their departure! ... I had been to see Edward Martyn in the afternoon in his warm little flat; very crippled, but more cheerful than I had seen him for a long time at the exit of the Tans. He is all for the Treaty and blames De Valera's doings here as much as he had admired them in America. He will listen to no excuse, says "he is jealous of Griffith. I met him in Gort at the time of his Clare election. I was doing my marketing and he and another had come to hold a meeting there, and I talked to them in their motor and I said 'You will get on all right as long as you hold to Griffith and keep him with you' and I saw a shadow pass across their faces." ... He says M. Collins made an inspection of the Volunteers all through Ireland before he went on the London mission, and came to the conclusion that we were not in a position to fight. When they brought the signed Treaty back (and this I had heard from others) no one in the Cabinet made an objection. But suddenly some days later De V. sent his protest to the Press.
- September 1923 (p. 475) – Edward Martyn had been ill for sometime and on 8 September I wrote to A.W. "On the way back from Galway we got to Tillyra about 6.30. The chauffeur had never been there before and instead of stopping at the hall door drove a little past it, and there, in the bow window of the library I saw Edward sitting. I thought he would turn or look round at the noise but he stayed quite immovable, like a stuffed figure, it was quite uncanny. I rang the bell and Dolan the butler appears, said he was "only pretty well", but showed me into the drawing room, and came back to say Edward would like to see me. I went in; he did not turn his head, gazed before him. I touched his hands (one could not shake them – all crippled, Dolan says he has to be fed) and spoke to him. He slowly turned his eyes but apparently without recognition. I went on talking without response till I asked if he had any pain and he whispered "No – thank God". I didn't know if he knew me, but talked a little, and presently he whispered "How is Robert?" I said "He is well, as all are in god's hands. He has gone before me and before you". then I said "My little grandson Richard is well", and he said with difficulty and in a whisper "I am very glad of that". Then I came away, there was no use staying ... It was a very sad visit. That was the last time I saw Edward Martyn, and I grieve for him.
- 7 December 1923 (p. 494) – Yesterday I took the children to a party at Ballyturnin, very merry for them. But I heard of Edward Martyn's death, it had taken place that morning. The Doctor told Mr. Bagot a tumour had been taken from his head on Saturday, Dr. McGuinness had come from Dublin for the operation and he [Martyn] lost a good deal of blood. Father O'Kelly said he had after the operation recognised Father Carr, which he had not done for some time. I asked about the funeral. He said Father Carr told him also he had bequeathed his body to the Dublin doctors "in the interests of science" so it may probably be in Dublin. ... I feel a loneliness now he is gone. He was from the beginning of my life here at Coole a good neighbour; he was always grateful for my husband's interest in him. He had gone to see Edward at Oxford to advise him not to build that large addition to his old castle, until at least his own taste and opinion were formed; and though the forces were too strong, his mother and her surroundings, he often regretted that he had not the strength of mind to take that advice. He was very kind to Robert, giving him his first real gun and letting him and his friends shoot [at] Tillyra in the holidays. And then, when Yeats' summers, and the theatre project began, he was constantly here, walking over and staying to dine. It was George Moore who broke that work together, putting his own name on the "Bending of the Bough", rewritten by him and Yeats but on Edward's foundation. And Edward had been weak about The Countess Cathleen, and took a wrong turning I think in withdrawing his support from our Theatre. Of late I was told he felt his support of Sinn Féin in its beginning had been wrong, it was on his conscience. And yet he hated, with a real hatred, England. I always felt there were two natures in him, the old blood of the Martyns and the blood of the Smiths.
- 11 December 1923 – Poor Edward. His body has been taken to Dublin to be dissected, by direction of his will. He directed the Dr. should visit it each day till removal to make sure he really was dead. But if he meant by giving it to the School of Medicine to perhaps save some other sufferer from what he has gone through (no doctor seeming to know what was wrong or able to help him) it was a fine thing to do. There is a nice notice of him in "The Times", better than he would have gained by following his family's wishes and settling down to marry and entertain the County.

== See also ==
- Oliver Óge Martyn
- Richard Óge Martyn

== Bibliography ==
- Gwynn, Denis (1930). Edward Martyn and the Irish Revival. London: Jonathan Cape.
- Ellis-Fermor, Una (1939). The Irish Dramatic Movement. London: Methuen.
- Robinson, Lennox, ed. (1947). Lady Gregory's Journals, 1916–30. London: Putnam & Co., and New York: Macmillan.
- Courtney, Marie-Thérèse (1956). Edward Martyn and the Irish Theatre. New York: Vantage Press.
- Hogan, Robert; Kilroy, James (1975). The Irish Literary Theatre, 1899–1901. Dublin: Dolmen Press.
- Martyn, Adrian (Summer 2006). "A Galway Lawyer at the Confederation of Kilkenny". Journal of the Genealogical Society of Ireland.
- Humphreys, Madeleine (2007). The Life and Times of Edward Martyn: An Aristocratic Bohemian. Dublin: Irish Academic Press.
- Martyn, Edward Joseph (2006). Loeber, Rolf; Loeber, Magda; Burnham, Anne (eds.). A Guide to Irish Fiction 1650–1900. Dublin: Four Courts Press.
- unknown (2009). "Edward Martyn". Dictionary of Irish Biography. Cambridge: Cambridge University Press.

Party political offices
| Preceded by New Position | President of Sinn Féin; 1905–1908 | Succeeded by John Sweetman |
