= Dunguaire Castle =

Tower house in County Galway, Ireland

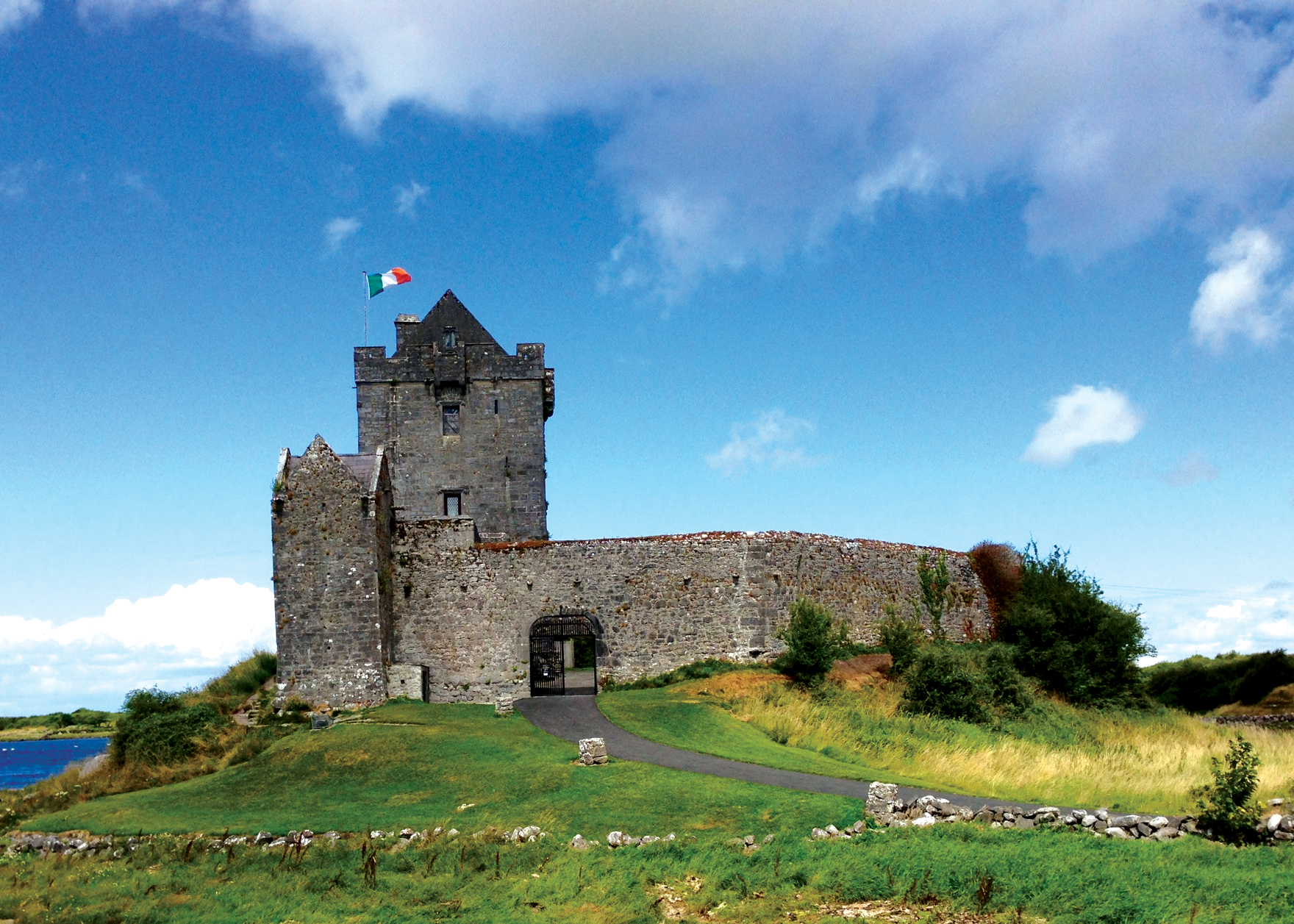
- Dunguaire Castle exterior

- Location within Ireland

General information
- Type: tower house
- Location: Kinvara, County Galway, Ireland
- Coordinates: 53.142°N 8.926°W
- Completed: 16th century
- Affiliation: Hynes clan

Dunguaire Castle (Irish: Dún Guaire) is a 16th-century tower house on the southeastern shore of Galway Bay in County Galway, Ireland, near Kinvara (also spelled Kinvarra). The name derives from the dun (fort) of King Guaire, the legendary king of Connacht.

The castle's 75-foot (23 m) tower and its defensive wall have been restored in the 1980s. However the castle has been closed since 2023. It's owner Shannon Airport Group offered it for sale to Galway County Council who have declined due to lack of funds. Therefore the castle is now closed to visitors. Frustration grows in Galway as funding dispute keeps the castle gates shut.

== History ==
The 19th century Gaelic scholar John O'Donovan states in his Ordnance Survey letters for County Galway, and his book, The Genealogies, Tribes and Customs of the Hy-Fiachrach, that Dunguaire was built by the Ó hEidhin (Hynes) clan, chiefs of Coill Ua bhFiachrach, the district around Kinvara, and also of Uí Fiachrach Aidhne an area coextensive with the diocese of Kilmacduagh covering the part of County Galway between the Burren and Galway Bay to the west and Slieve Aughty to the east.

Dunguaire Castle was used in the 1969 Walt Disney movie Guns in the Heather in which the castle was featured as Boyne Castle. It was also the Scottish castle home of the main character in the 1979 film North Sea Hijack.

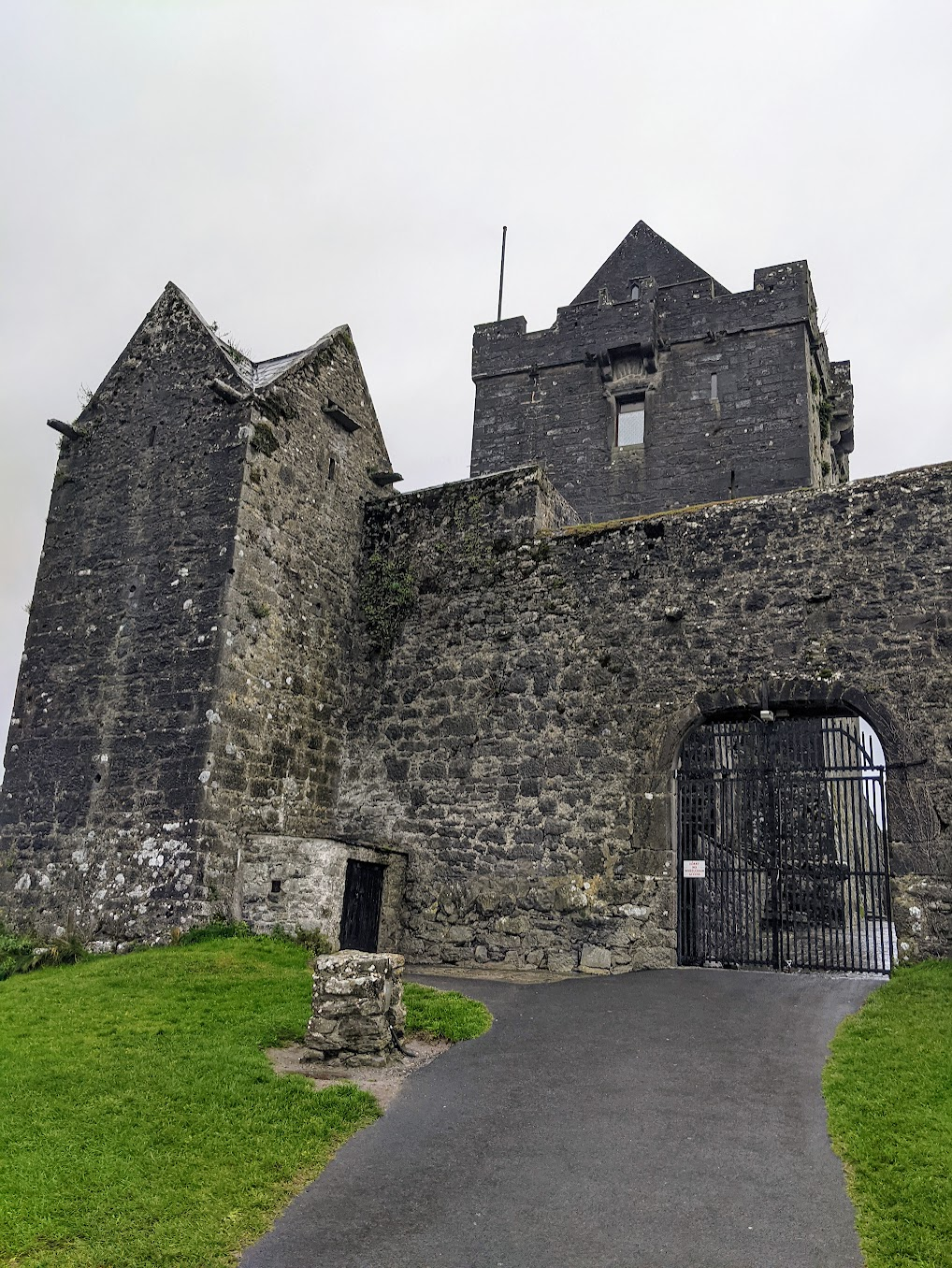
Entrance to Dunguaire Castle

== Legends ==
Another regionally well known legend is the "Road of the Dishes" (Bothar na Mias), involving King Guaire and St. Colman of Kilmacduagh.
