= Scannlán mac Fearghal =

Scannlán mac Fearghal, ancestor of the Ó Scannláin family of County Galway, fl. 10th century.

Scannlán was a member of the Uí Fiachrach Aidhne dynasty of south County Galway, and is listed in the genealogies as a seventeen-times great-grandson of King Guaire Aidne mac Colmáin of Connacht, who died in 663. His immediate descendants would use his name as their surname, and for a time be of some prominence in Aidhne, but were pushed out of power by their kinsmen and remained only a minor family, some moving to Thomond/County Clare.

Scannlán was a kinsman of a number of other men whose descendants also took their surnames from them, such as

- Comhaltan mac Maol Cúlaird - Ó Comhaltan/Colton/Coulton
- Seachnasach mac Donnchadh - Ó Seachnasaigh/Shaughnessy
- Eidhean mac Cléireach - Ó Cléirigh/Cleary
- Cathal mac Ógán - Ó Cathail/Cahill
- Giolla Ceallaigh mac Comhaltan - MacGiolla Ceallaigh/Kilkelly

Though in many cases the relationship between these men was quite distant, Scannlán would have been a contemporary or near-contemporary of almost all of them.
