= Comhaltan mac Maol Cúlaird =

Comhaltan mac Maol Cúlaird, Irish dynast, fl. 10th century.

Comhaltan was a member of the Uí Fiachrach Aidhne dynasty of south County Galway, and was the ancestor of the Uí Comhaltan, (Colton/Coulton), a minor surname in the south Connacht-north Munster area.

He was the father of Giolla Ceallaigh mac Comhaltan, and a kinsman to Seachnasach mac Donnchadh, Scannlán mac Fearghal, Eidhean mac Cléireach, and Cathal mac Ógán, who gave their names to the families of O'Shaughnessy, Ó Scannláin, Ó Cléirigh, Ó hEidhin/Hynes and Ó Cathail/Cahill.
