= Kilkenny (surname) =

Kilkenny is a surname. Notable persons with that surname include:

- Allison Kilkenny (born 1983), American journalist and podcaster
- Jimmy Kilkenny (1934–2003), footballer
- John C. Kilkenny, film executive
- John Kilkenny (1901–1995), U.S. federal judge
- Mike Kilkenny (1945–2018), Canadian baseball player
- Neil Kilkenny (born 1985), English-born Australian footballer
- Niamh Kilkenny (born 1989), camogie player
- Ollie Kilkenny (born 1962), hurler
- Tony Kilkenny (born 1959), hurler
