= Cleireach mac Ceadach =

Cleireach mac Ceadach (died 820) was King of Uí Fiachrach Aidhne, Ireland.

Preceded by Cathal Aidhne mac Ailell	King of Uí Fiachrach Aidhne; 812–820	Succeeded by Tighearnach mac Cathmogha
