= Mael Fabhaill mac Cléirigh =

Mael Fabhaill mac Cléirigh (died 887) was the King of Uí Fiachrach Aidhne in Ireland.

Mael Fabhaill was one of the last kings of Aidhne who did not use a surname. His son and successor, Tighearnach Ua Cleirigh, did so and was ancestor to the family of Ó Cléirigh.

Mael Fabhaill had a brother, Eidhean mac Cléirigh, who gave his name to the Ó hEidhin family of south County Galway.

Preceded by Uathmharan mac Brocan	King of Uí Fiachrach Aidhne; 871–887	Succeeded by Tighearnach Ua Cleirigh
