= Art mac Flaitnia =

Art mac Flaitnia, or Art mac Flaithnia, King of Uí Fiachrach Aidhne (d. 772).

The succession to the kingship is uncertain the death of Fergal Aidne mac Artgaile in 696, a reflection of Aidhne's drastic reduction in status. Art is only one of two rulers of the kingdoms known from the 8th-century.

Art is recorded as having been killed in 772 along with his neighbor Aedh Ailghin, King of Ui Maine. The Annals of the Four Masters claim they were slain.

During the middle-decades of the century, the Déisi Tuisceart (later known as the Dál gCais) annexed what is now called County Clare into Munster, calling it Thomond. It has remained a part of Munster to the present day.

Preceded by Conchubhar mac Cumasgach	King of Uí Fiachrach Aidhne; 769-772	Succeeded by Anluan mac Conchobhar
