= Ceallaigh =

Ceallaigh is a surname. Notable people with the surname include:

- Royal House Ceallaigh
- Fiachra Ó Ceallaigh O.F.M. (18 August 1933 –), an Irish Catholic Bishop
- Gilla Ceallaigh Ua Cleirigh (dies 1003), king of Ui Fiachrach Aidhne
- Giolla Ceallaigh mac Comhaltan (fl. 10th century), a member of the Uí Fiachrach Aidhne of south Galway
- Muircheartach mac Pilib Ó Ceallaigh (died 1407), Archbishop of Tuam and patron of An Leabhar Ua Maine
- Philip Ó Ceallaigh, Irish short story writer living in Bucharest
- Seán Ó Ceallaigh disambiguation page
- Seán Ó Ceallaigh (Clare politician) (1896–1994), Irish Fianna Fáil politician
- Tomás mac Muircheartaigh Ó Ceallaigh, O.P., Archbishop of Tuam, 1438 to 1441
