= Mael Ruanaidh na Paidre Ua hEidhin =

Historic Irish regional king

Mael Ruanaidh na Paidre Ua hEidhin (died 1014) was King of Ui Fiachrach Aidhne.

Mael Ruanaidh was the first of the Ua hEidhin kings to rule Aidhne, the last of whom, Eoghan Ó hEidhin, died in 1340.

Mael Ruanaidh was a partisan of Brian Boru, and may have been related by marriage. He fought on the side of Brian at the Battle of Clontarf in 1014, where he died.

Preceded by Gilla Ceallaigh Ua Cleirigh	King of Uí Fiachrach Aidhne; 1003-1014	Succeeded by Mhic Mac Comhaltan Ua Cleirigh
