= Anluan mac Conchobhar =

King of Uí Fiachrach Aidhne (died 805)

Anluan mac Conchobhar (died 805) was King of Uí Fiachrach Aidhne.

Following a long era of obscurity in the aftermath of the death of Fergal Aidne mac Artgaile in 696, the Uí Fiachrach Aidhne dynasty entered the historical record in the early ninth century.

From the time of Anluan, its rulers and other notables were listed regularly in the annals till the end of Gaelic Ireland in the 17th century.

Anluan may have been a son of King Conchubhar mac Cumasgach (died 763).

Preceded by Art mac Flaitnia	King of Uí Fiachrach Aidhne ?-805	Succeeded by Cathal Aidhne mac Ailell
