= Sárnait =

Sixth-century Irish saint

Sárnait, also known as Surney of Drumacoo or Sourney, was a 6th-century Irish saint. She is commemorated on May 30.

Surney was an associate of Colman mac Duagh, who was the bishop of the locality at the time. Her background is unknown, but may have been a name of Uí Fiachrach Aidhne like Colman. Her floruit is estimated from Colmán mac Cobthaig to Guaire Aidne mac Colmáin. Surney was the founder of the church of Drumacoo, in the parish of Ballinderreen, County Galway around 550. She was known to resurrect animals, even after they had been eaten.

A later medieval church, now disused, now stands on the site of the original foundation. The adjoining graveyard is still in use. St. Sourney’s Holy Well is nearby.

== Sources ==
- The Manners and Customs of Hy Fiachrach, John O'Donovan, (Dublin, 1846)
- Episcopal Succession, John Brady, Rome, 1876
- The History and Antiquities of the Diocese of Kilmacduagh, Jerome A. Fahy, 1893
- Irish Catholic Directory for 1909
