= Tighearnach ua Cleirigh =

Irish king, 10th century

- Died: 916
- Occupation: King of Uí Fiachrach Aidhne
- Predecessor: Maelfabhaill mac Cleireach
- Successor: Domhnall mac Lorcan

Tighearnach ua Cleirigh (died 916) was King of Uí Fiachrach Aidhne.

Sub anno 916, the Annals of the Four Masters states Tighearnach ua Cleirigh, lord of Aidhne, died. He appears to have been a son of the previous king, Maelfabhaill mac Cleireach. His appellation was therefore not a surname, merely denoting he was the grandson of Cleireach. However, his descendants adopted the surname Ó Cléirigh, and all subsequent bearers of the name are believed to descend from him. Notables include:

- Flann Ua Clerigh, fl. 952, apparently the first to use the surname.
- Mac Comhaltan Ua Cleirigh, King of Uí Fiachrach Aidhne, fl. 964.
- Ruaidhrí mac Coscraigh, fl. 993
- Mac Comhaltan Ua Cleirigh, fl. 998, alias Muireadhach?
- Gilla Ceallaigh Ua Cleirigh, died 1003
- Lughaidh Ó Cléirigh (fl. 1595–1630)
- Mícheál Ó Cléirigh (c. 1590–1643), considered the chief author of the chronicle of medieval Irish history known as the Annals of the Four Masters.
- Cú Choigcríche Ó Cléirigh (died 1664)

Preceded by Maelfabhaill mac Cleireach	King of Uí Fiachrach Aidhne; 887?-916	Succeeded by Domhnall mac Lorcan
