= Mhic Mac Comhaltan Ua Cleirigh =

Local king in Ireland, died 1025

Mhic Mac Comhaltan Ua Cleirigh (died 1025) was King of Ui Fiachrach Aidhne.

An unnamed grandson of Comhaltan Ua Cleirigh was the last Ua Cleirigh ruler of Aidhne. Henceforth, the family was dispersed entirely form Aidhne into north Connacht; one Gilla Isa Ó Cléirigh would be Bishop of Leyny (Achonry) before his death in 1230. Descendants would eventually become the Ó Cléirigh Bardic family of Tír Chonaill.

Preceded by Mael Ruanaidh na Paidre Ua hEidhin	King of Uí Fiachrach Aidhne; 1014-1025	Succeeded by Mael Fabhaill Ua hEidhin
