= Cléirchén mac Murchadh =

Cléirchén mac Murchadh (died 908) was King of Maigh Seóla. He appears only in the annals, and is not listed in any extant genealogies, so it is unknown if he had any descendants. He was the first of two sons of Murchadh mac Maenach to rule the kingdom. His name does not appear again in any branch of the Muintir Murchada. It did however appear as a surname among the neighbouring dynasty of Uí Fiachrach Aidhne by the 920's. It was the name of an obscure hermit (Cléircheán of Saintclerans) in the latter territory.

Preceded by Murchadh mac Maenach	King of Maigh Seóla; 891–908	Succeeded by Urchadh mac Murchadh
