= Marcán mac Tommáin =

Marcán mac Tommáin (died 653) was the 15th king of the Uí Maine.

In his time the Uí Maine were allied and subject to the Ui Fiachrach Aidhne, a branch of the Connachta. They were ruled by Guaire Aidne mac Colmáin. The annals record that Marcán was slain in a battle in Airthir Seola by Cenn Fáelad mac Colgan and Máenach mac Báethíne of the Ui Briun in 653. The Annals of Ulster refer to it as a battle of the Connachta. Guaire's brother Loingsech mac Colmáin was ruling at this time and was being challenged by the Ui Briun.

Preceded by Conall mac Máele Dúib	King of Uí Maine; 629–653	Succeeded by Fithceallach mac Flainn
