= Drumacoo =

Ruined ecclesiastical site in Galway, Ireland

- Droim Mucú
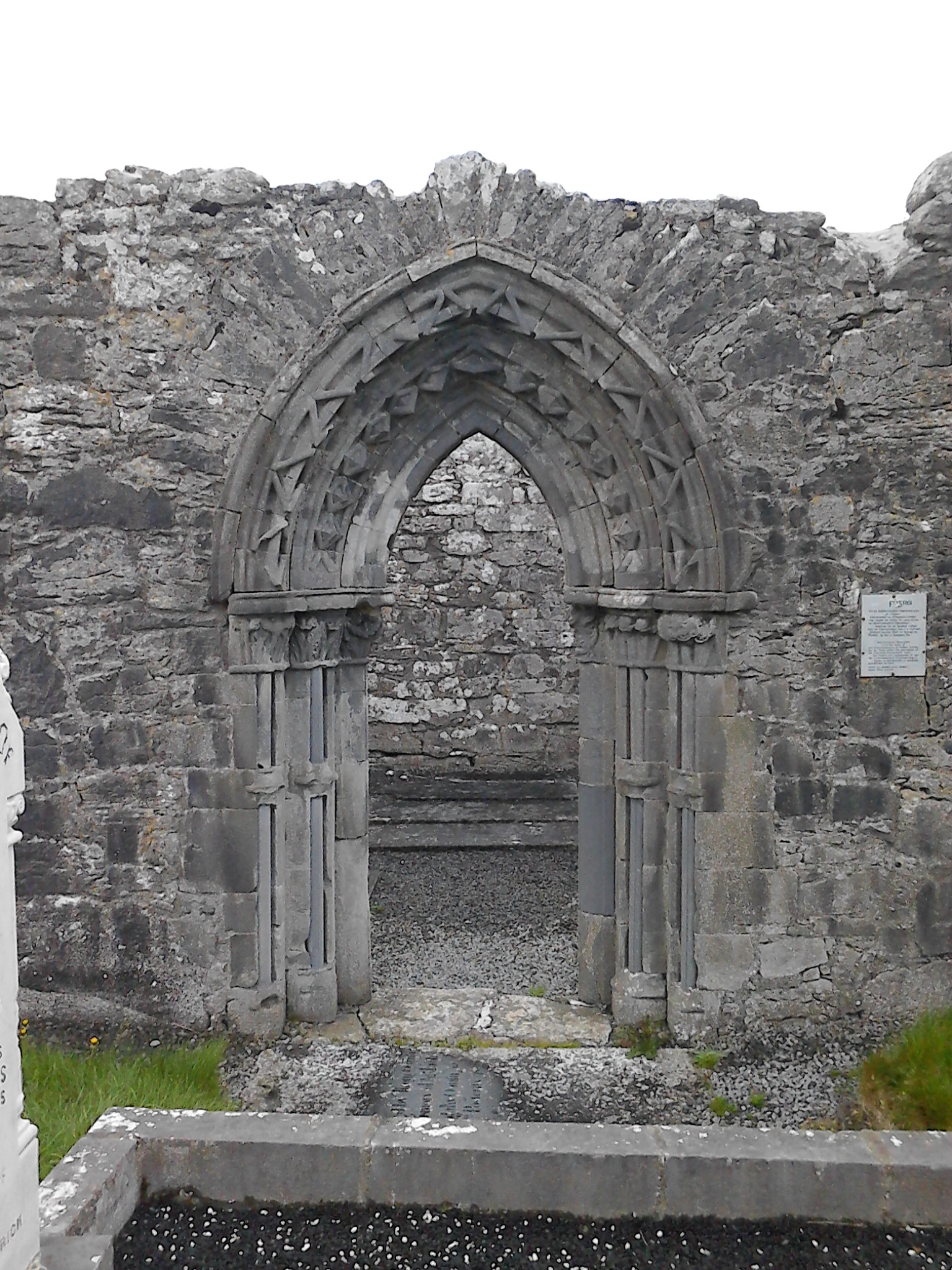
- south doorway

- Location within Ireland
- Interactive map of Drumacoo

Monastery information
- Other names: Druim-muccado; Droma-Mucada
- Established: 6th century AD
- Diocese: Kilmacduagh

People
- Founder: Sárnait

Architecture
- Status: ruined
- Style: Late Gothic

Site
- Location: Drumacoo, Ballinderreen, County Galway
- Coordinates: 53.198723°N 8.904724°W
- Visible remains: church, holy well
- Public access: yes

Drumacoo is a medieval ecclesiastical site and National Monument located in County Galway, Ireland.

== Location ==
Drumacoo is located 1.5 km (0.93 mi) north of Ballinderreen, to the east of Galway Bay.

== History ==
The monastic settlement at Drumacoo was founded in the 6th century by Sárnait (Sourney, Sairnait, Surney, Sorney), a female saint and associate of Colman mac Duagh. She was buried here at the site known as St. Sourney's Bed.

Drumacoo was located in the ancient kingdom of Uí Fiachrach Aidhne.

The original stone parish church had a flat-headed west doorway and was built of large stones. It was extended eastwards in the 13th century AD and the finely carved south doorway was added.

According to the Annals of Loch Cé, in 1232, "Fachtna Ó hAllgaith, comarb of Druim-mucadha, and official of Uí-Fiachrach; keeper of a house of hospitality for guests and invalids; and the promoter of learning and improver of country and land, in hoc anno quievit." (in this year rested, i.e. died)

In 1830, the Gothic Revival mausoleum of the St George family was built onto the stone church.

== Ruins and monuments ==
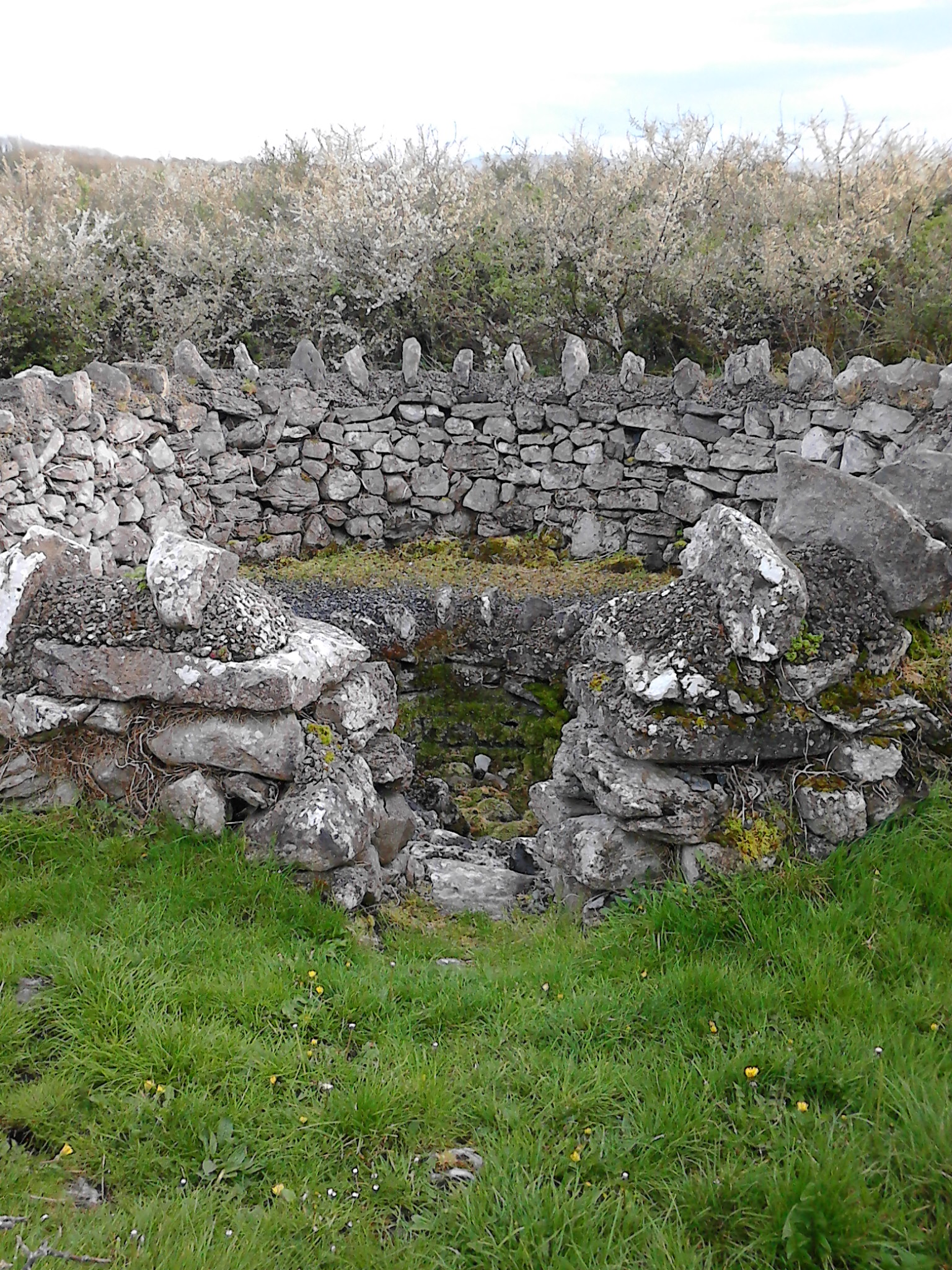
Holy well linked to St. Sárnait.

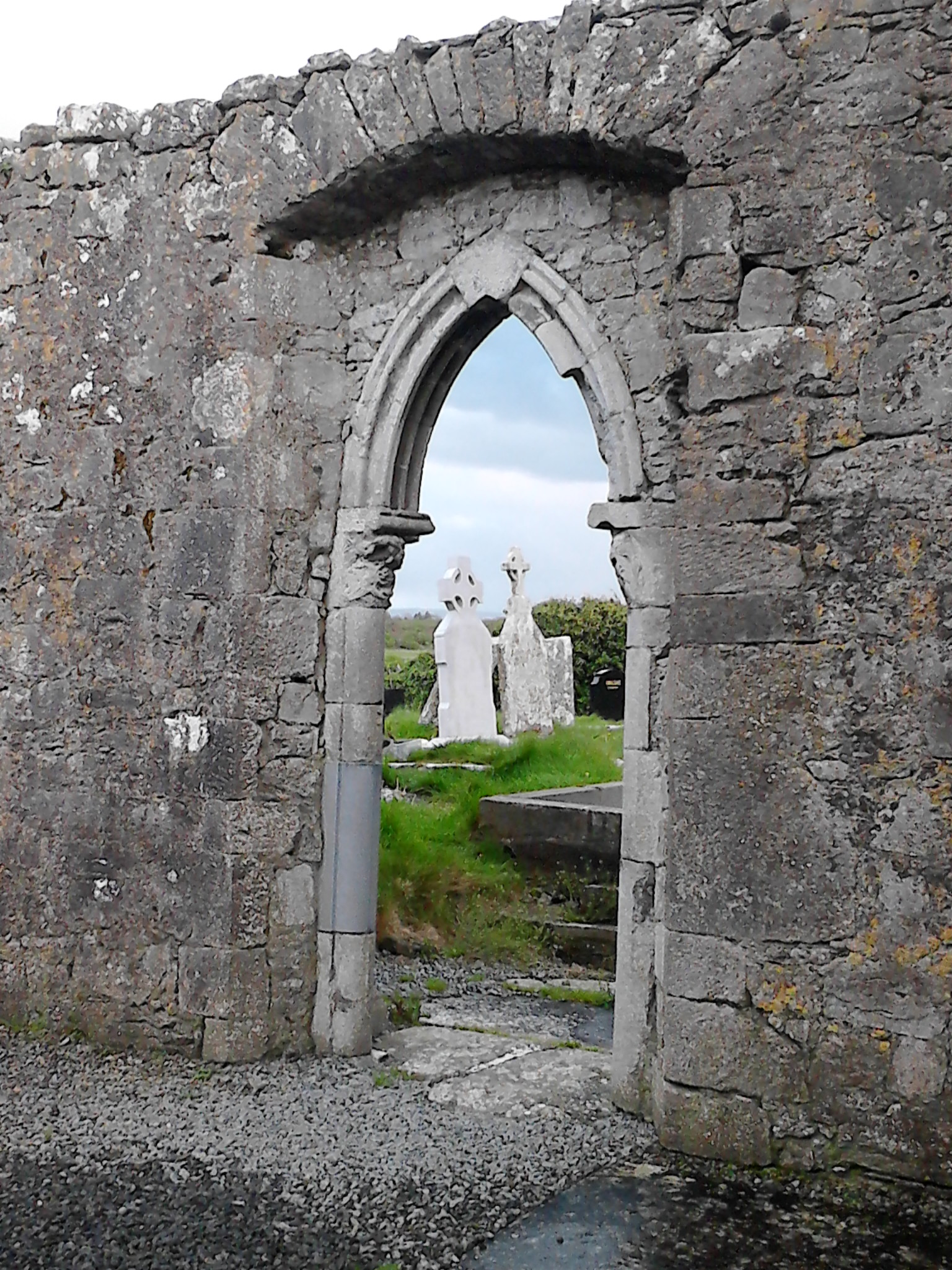
Doorway

A stone church with nearby a holy well and St. Sourney's Bush, a rag bush.
