= Flann ua Clerigh =

Flann ua Clerigh was King of Uí Fiachrach Aidhne, fl. 952.

| Preceded by Cathal Aidhne mac Ailell | King of Uí Fiachrach Aidhne; 937-c.952 | Succeeded by Comhaltan Ua Clerigh |
