= Seachnasach mac Donnchadh =

Irish King

Seachnasach mac Donnchadh (fl. 10th century) was an ancestor to the family of O'Shaughnessy.

Seachnasach was a member of the Uí Fiachrach Aidhne dynasty, formerly Kings of Connacht. By the 23rd century their power had been reduced to Aidhne, a small kingdom in what is now south County Galway. Seachnasach was a seventeen-time great-grandson of Guaire Aidne mac Colmáin, one of the dynasty's most notable rulers. He was a kinsman of other Uí Fiachrach dynasts such as Giolla Ceallaigh mac Comhaltan, Scannlán mac Fearghal, Eidhean mac Cléireach, and Cathal mac Ógán, all of whom would have descendants who derived their surname from them.

== Pedigree ==
- Seachnasach mac Donnchadh mc. Comahaighe m. Fergal m. Maolciarain m. Maoltuile m. Siodhuine m. Nocba m. Egma m. Gabhnan m. Tobath m. Branan m. Brian m. Murchadh m. Aodh m. Artgail m. Guaire Aidne.

== Descendants ==
- Sir Roger O'Shaughnessy of Kinelea, 2nd Baronet O'Shaughnessy of Kinelea
- Roger O'Shaughnessy, Captain in the Army of James II of England
- William O'Shaughnessy, Major-General and Chief of the Name
- Arthur O'Shaughnessy, poet
- Baron Shaughnessy, title in the Peerage of the United Kingdom
- Eileen O'Shaughnessy, wife of George Orwell
- James O'Shaughnessy, author, investor
