= Mael Macduach =

Mael Macduach (died 920) was King of Uí Fiachrach Aidhne.

Sub anno 920, the Annals of the Four Masters states Mael-micduach, lord of Aidhne, was slain by the foreigners. Aedh, son of Lonan O'Guaire, Tanist of Aidhne, died.

Preceded by Tighearnach Ua Cleirigh	King of Uí Fiachrach Aidhne; 916–920	Succeeded by Domhnall mac Lorcan
