= Conchubhar mac Cumasgach =

Irish king

Conchubhar mac Cumasgach or Conchobar mac Cummascaig (died 769) was King of Uí Fiachrach Aidhne, now part of Ireland.

With the death of Fergal Aidne mac Artgaile, died 696, the kingdom of Aidhne entered an era of political insignificance, its rulers been confined to their immediate homeland and reduced to the status of mere lords. Even the succession is uncertain, as Conchubhar is only listed as king upon his death in 769, over seventy years after the death of Fergal. He is only one of two rulers of the kingdoms known from the 8th-century.

== Notes ==
Preceded by Fergal Aidne mac Artgaile	King of Uí Fiachrach Aidhne ?-769	Succeeded by Art mac Flaitnia
