= Ceallach mac Guaire =

Ceallach mac Guaire (died 665) was King of Uí Fiachrach Aidhne.

Ceallach was a son of the previous king, but reigned for only two years. In 664 "A great mortality prevailed in Ireland ... called the Buidhe Connail" and in 666 "A great plague raged" which killed hundreds in Connacht. However it is not known if either event led to Ceallach's demise.

Preceded by Guaire Aidne mac Colmáin	King of Uí Fiachrach Aidhne; 663–665	Succeeded by Muirchertach Nár mac Guairi
