= Fachtna =

Fachtna is an Irish personal name and may refer to:

Ordered chronologically

- Fachtna Fáthach, 2nd-1st century BC high king of Ireland
- Fachtna of Kiltoom (fl. c. 460), Irish saint
- Saint Fachanan or Fachtna, sixth century monastery founder and first bishop of Kilfenora
- Fachtna of Rosscarbery (died c. 600), Irish monastery founder and abbot
- Fachtna mac Folachtan (died 723), Abbot of Clonfert
- Fachtna Murphy (born 1947), Irish former Garda Commissioner
- Fachtna Ó hAllgaith (died 1232), Irish erenagh and benefactor
