= Comhaltan Ua Clerigh =

Irish local king, 10th century

Comhaltan Ua Clerigh was King of Uí Fiachrach Aidhne, fl. 964/966-978.

Sub anno 966, the Chronicon Scotorum states:

A defeat was inflicted on ua Ruairc in Boirenn of Corcu Mruad by Comaltán grandson of Cléirech and by Mael Sechnaill son of Argda, in which 4000 fell, including Taichlech ua Gadra, i.e. king of Luigne.

The much later Annals of the Four Masters date the incident to 964, stating:

A victory was gained by Comhaltan Ua Cleirigh, i.e. lord of Ui-Fiachrach-Aidhne, and by Maelseachlainn, son of Arcda, over Fearghal Ua Ruairc, where seven hundred were lost, together with Toichleach Ua Gadhra, lord of South Luighne.

Under the year 978, Chronicon Scotorum states Comaltán ua Cléirigh, king of Uí Fhiachrach of Aidne, dies.

Preceded by Domhnall mac Lorcan	King of Uí Fiachrach Aidhne fl.964	Succeeded by Mac Comhaltan Ua Cleirigh
