= Cathal mac Ógáin =

Cathal mac Ógáin is an ancestor of the Ó Cathail–Cahill family of County Galway.

Cathal was a member of the Uí Fiachrach Aidhne, and a thirteen-time great-grandson of Nath Í, King of Connacht. His grandchildren and great-grandchildren were the first to bear the surname Ó Cathail (i.e., ua Cathal, grandson/descendant of Cathal) and until the 13th century would contest the kingship of Aidhne with the descendants of Seachnasach mac Donnchadha, Scannlán mac Fearghaile, Eidhean mac Cléirigh and Giolla Ceallaigh mac Comhaltáin. While the family did provide a number of rulers of the area, ultimately Cathal's descendants were overthrown and suppressed by the descendants of Seachnasach mac Donnchadha, and remained a minor family until the end of Gaelic Ireland.

Cahill is the name of a number of distinct families in Ireland, and not all are related.
