= Patricia Cahill =

Patricia Cahill may refer to:

- Patricia Cahill (drug smuggler)
- Patricia Cahill (singer)
