= Dunkellin =

Barony in County Galway, Ireland

Dunkellin Dún Coillín (Irish)
- Barony
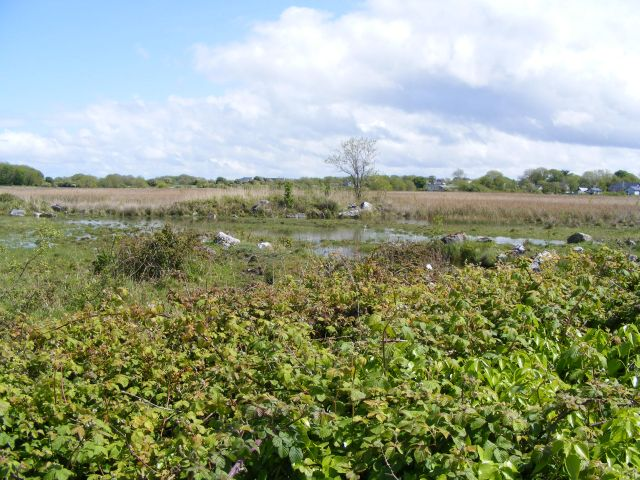
- Ballinderreen Lough

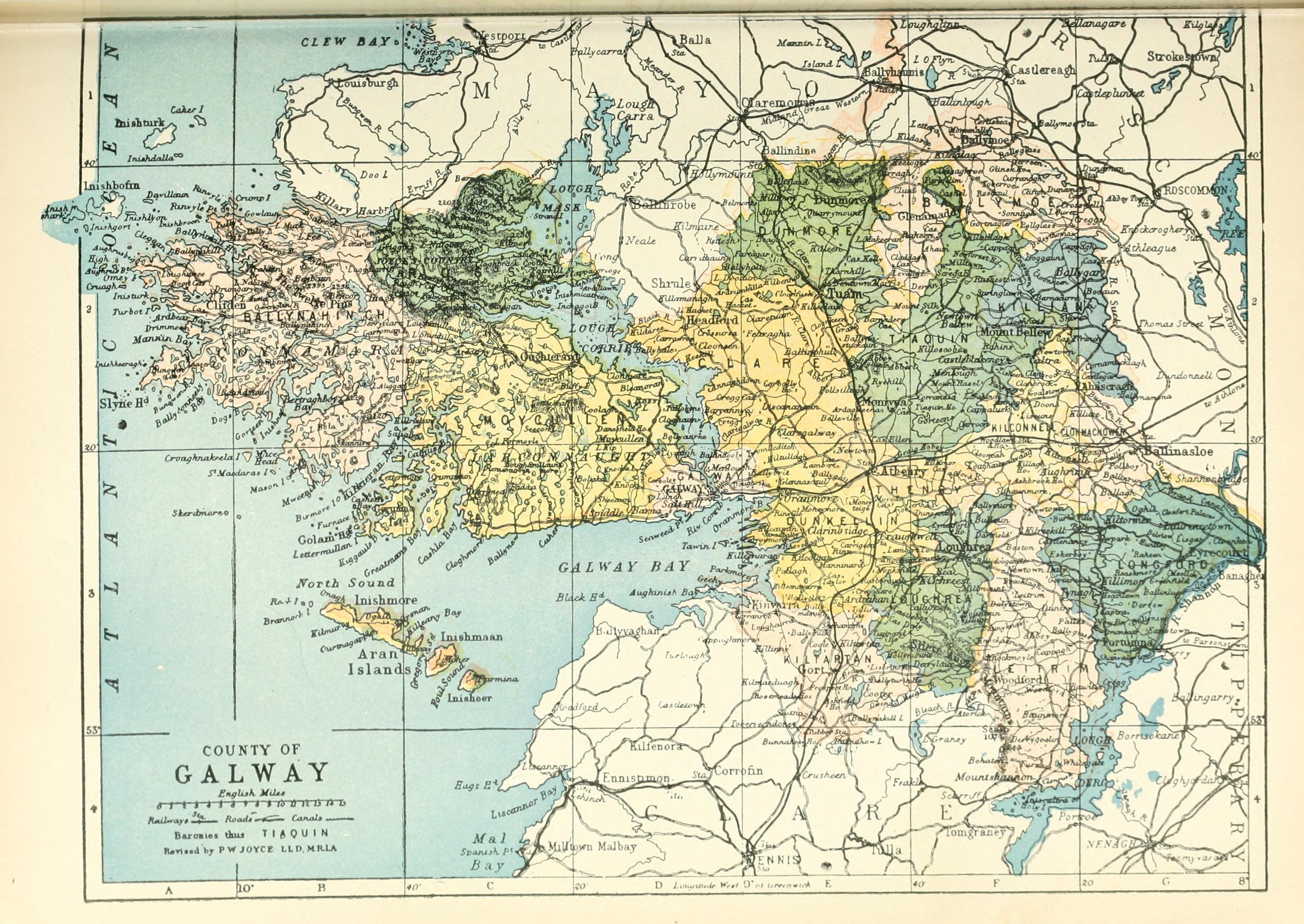
- Barony map of County Galway, 1900; Dunkellin is in the middle, coloured yellow.

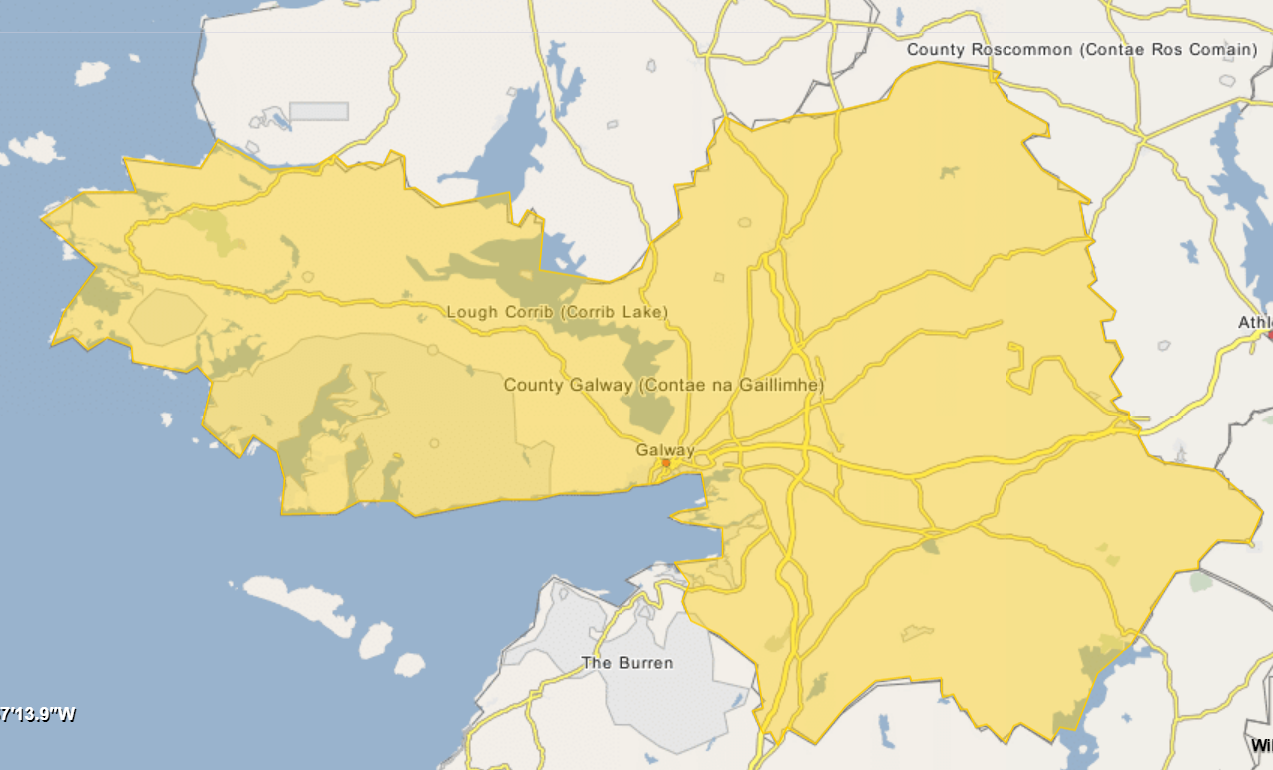
- Location within County Galway Location within Ireland
- Coordinates: 53°13′N 8°53′W
- Sovereign state: Ireland
- Province: Connacht
- County: Galway

Area
  - Total: 337.4 km^{2} (130.3 sq mi)

Dunkellin (Irish: Dún Coillín) is a historical barony in eastern County Galway, Ireland.

Baronies were mainly cadastral rather than administrative units. They acquired modest local taxation and spending functions in the 19th century before being superseded by the Local Government (Ireland) Act 1898.

== History ==
The name derived from Irish Dún Coillín, "large hillfort of the little wood" or "Caillin's fort."

This region was part of the territory of Ui Fiachrach Aidhne and was ruled in the Gaelic Irish period by the Ó hEidhin (O'hEdihin) O'Heyne, along with the O'Clery and the O'Shaughnessys. The O'Clerys were chiefs of the Uí Fiachrach Finn up to the 13th century. The O'Finn family were erenaghs of Kilcogan. Clann Cosgraigh (Cosgroves), of the Uí Maine, also had territory east of Galway Bay. Following the Norman conquest, the Blake (Caddell) surname is also found in Dunkellin.

The local chief Ulick na gCeann Burke was made Earl of Clanricarde and Baron of Dunkellin in 1543. His son Richard Burke, 2nd Earl of Clanricarde built a castle at Dunkellin.

Dunkellin barony was created before 1576.

== Geography ==
Dunkellin is in the centre of the county, east of Galway Bay.

== List of settlements ==
Settlements within the historical barony of Dunkellin include:

- Ballinderreen
- Clarinbridge
- Craughwell
- Kilchreest
- Kilcolgan
- Oranmore
