= Loingsech mac Colmáin =

Loingsech mac Colmáin (died 655) (or Laidgnén) was a king of Connacht from the Ui Fiachrach branch of the Connachta. He was of the Ui Fiachrach Aidhne sept this branch and was the son of Colmán mac Cobthaig.

His brother Guaire Aidne mac Colmáin (died 663) is associated with events in the annals prior to 649 and it is possible that Guaire abdicated the throne of the Ui Fiachrach Aidhne upon his defeat at the Battle of Carn Conaill. Loingsech succeeded Rogallach mac Uatach (died 649) of the rival Uí Briúin branch as king of Connacht in 649. The king-lists mention Loingsech, but of the Irish annals, only the Annals of Tigernach mention his death.

Rivalry between the Ui Fiachrach Aidhne and Uí Briúin is attested by two events that occurred in his reign. In 653 the ally of the Ui Fiachrach Aidhne, Marcán mac Tommáin, the king of the Ui Maine was slain in battle in Iarthair Seola by Cenn Fáelad mac Colgan (died 682) and Máenach mac Báethíne of the Ui Briun. Also in 654 occurred the killing of Fergus mac Rogallaig (died 654) of the Ui Briun, son of Rogallach mac Uatach, by the Ui Fiachrach Aidhne.

Loingsech had no known descendants and was succeeded by his brother Guaire.

Loingsech is mentioned in Lady Gregory's translation of The Fate of the Children of Lir as "Lairgren, son of Colman, son of Cobthach," who seems likely to be his father Colmán mac Cobthaig. Lairgen's supposed marriage to Deoch, daughter of Finghin, is said to have been the "coming together of the Man from the North and the Woman from the South," which broke the 900-year curse upon the children and returned them to human form.

== See also ==
- Kings of Connacht

Preceded by Colmán mac Cobthaig	King of Uí Fiachrach Aidhne; 622–655	Succeeded by Guaire Aidne mac Colmáin
Preceded by Rogallach mac Uatach	King of Connacht; 649–655	Succeeded by Guaire Aidne mac Colmáin
