= Tony Kilkenny =

Irish hurler

Personal information
- Native name: Tónaí Mac Gilla Chainnigh (Irish)
- Born: 7 June 1959 (age 67) Kiltormer, County Galway
- Occupation: Nurse
- Height: 5 ft 10 in (178 cm)

Sport
- Sport: Hurling
- Position: Left wing-back
Club
- Years: Club
- 1970s-1990s: Kiltormer
Club titles
- Galway titles: 4
- Connacht titles: 3
- All-Ireland Titles: 1
Inter-county
- Years: County
- 1980s: Galway
Inter-county titles
- All-Irelands: 2
- NHL: 2
- All Stars: 0

Tony Kilkenny (born 7 June 1959 in Kiltormer, County Galway) is an Irish former sportsperson. He played hurling with his local club Kiltormer and was a member of the Galway senior inter-county team in the 1980s. His brother, Ollie, also played with Galway.
