= Fachtna Ó hAllgaith =

Fachtna Ó hAllgaith (died 1232) was an Irish erenagh and benefactor.

The Annals of Connacht reference Ó hAllgaith under the year 1232, saying of him:

Fachtna O hAllgaith, coarb of Drumacoo and official of the Ui Fiachrach, who kept a guest-house and a leper-house and was [a man] of learning and a benefactor of the countryside, rested this year.

Drumacoo is an ecclesiastical site in the parish of Ballinderreen, County Galway, which was then referred to as Uí Fiachrach Aidhne.

== See also ==
- Hostel
- Leper colony
