= Justin Campbell =

Justin Campbell may refer to:

- Justin Campbell (hurler)
- Justin Campbell (baseball)
