= Eidhean mac Cléirigh =

Eidhean mac Cléirigh, ancestor of the Ó hEidhin/Hynes family of County Galway, fl. 800.

Eidhean was a member of the dynasty of Uí Fiachrach Aidhne, and a descendant of Guaire Aidne mac Colmáin (d. 663), Fiachrae mac Eochaid Mugmedon (fl. 5th century) and thus distantly related to the dynasty of Uí Néill. His descendants ruled Aidhne for a time, most notably in the 1090s when Flaithbertaigh Ua Flaithbertaigh seized the kingship of Connacht and installed an Ó hEidhin as a puppet-king for a time.

Eidhean was a kinsman of a number of other men whose descendants also took their surnames from them, such as

- Comhaltan mac Maol Cúlaird – Ó Comhaltan, Colton, Coulton
- Cathal mac Ógán – Ó Cathail, Cahill
- Giolla Ceallaigh mac Comhaltan – MacGiolla Ceallaigh, Kilkelly

and, of course

- Cleireach himself

Though in many cases the relationship between these men was quite distant, Eidhean would have been a contemporary or near-contemporary of almost all of them.

He was killed in battle against Neide mac Onchu, about the year 800.

== See also ==
- Tighearnach Ua Cleirigh (died 916) was King of Uí Fiachrach Aidhne.
