= Uathmharan mac Brocan =

Irish king, 9th century

Uathmharan mac Brocan (died 871) was King of Uí Fiachrach Aidhne.

Preceded by Tighearnach mac Cathmogha	King of Uí Fiachrach Aidhne; 822–871	Succeeded by Mael Fabhaill mac Cleireach
