= Kings of Uí Fiachrach Aidhne =

The Kings of Uí Fiachrach Aidhne were rulers of a Trícha cét located in the cóiced of Connacht, Ireland.

== Early kings ==
- Goibnenn mac Conaill, fl. 538
- Cobthach mac Gabran
- Colmán mac Cobthaig, died 622
- Loingsech mac Colmáin, died 655
- Guaire Aidne mac Colmáin, died 663
- Ceallach mac Guaire, died 666
- Muirchertach Nár mac Guairi, died 668
- Fergal Aidne mac Artgaile, died 696
- Conchubhar mac Cumasgach, died 769
- Art mac Flaitnia, died 772
- Anluan mac Conchobhar, died 805
- Cathal Aidhne mac Ailell, died 812
- Cleireach mac Ceadach, died 820
- Tighearnach mac Cathmogha, died 822
- Uathmharan mac Brocan, died 871,
- Maelfabhaill mac Cleireach, died 887

== High Medieval kings ==
- Eidhean mac Cléireach, fl. 908
- Tighearnach ua Cleirigh, died 916
- Mael Macduach, died 920
- Domhnall mac Lorcan, died 937
- Flann Ua Clerigh, fl. 952
- Comhaltan Ua Clerigh, fl. 964
- Mac Comhaltan Ua Cleirigh, fl. 998, alias Muireadhach?
- Gilla Ceallaigh Ua Cleirigh, died 1003
- Mael Ruanaidh na Paidre Ua hEidhin, died 1014
- Mhic Mac Comhaltan Ua Cleirigh, died 1025, alias Comhaltan?
- Mael Fabhaill Ua hEidhin, died 1048
- Gilla na Naomh Ua hEidhin, died 1100
- Aodh Ua hEidhin, died 1121
- Gilla Mo Choinni Ua Cathail, died 1147
- Gilla Cheallaigh Ua hEidhin, died 1153
- Muirgheas Ua hEidhin, died 1180
- Owen Ó hEidhin, died 1253
- Eoghan Ó hEidhin, died 1340

== Family tree ==
             Eochaid Mugmedon
         =Mongfind             + Cairenn
            |                  |
   _________|___________       |
   |        |          |       |
   |        |          |       |
   Brion Fiachrae  Ailill  Niall Noígíallach died c.450. 
            |                   (Uí Néill)
   _________|________________________
   |                 |             | 
   |                 |             |
   Amalgaid          Nath Í       Macc Ercae
                     |
  ___________________|_____________________
  |           |                           |
  |           |                           | 
  Echu   Ailill Molt, d.482   Fiachnae     
  |                                       |
  |                                       |
 (Uí Fiachrach Aidhne)     (Uí Fiachrach Muaidhe)
  |
  |
  Eogan
  |
  |
  Conall
  |
  |____________
  |          |
  |          |  
  Gabran     Goibnenn mac Conaill, fl. 538
  |
  |
  Cobthach
  |
  |
  Colmán mac Cobthaig d. 622
  |
  |________________________________________
  |                                       |
  |                                       |
 Loingsech mac Colmáin, d.655     Guaire Aidne mac Colmáin, d. 663
                                          |
      ____________________________________|
      |                                   |        
      |                                   |      
      Muirchertach Nar, d.668.            Artgal  
                                          |  
                                          |                                          
                                          Fergal
