= Comhaltan Ua Cleirigh =

Mac Comhaltan Ua Cleirigh, King of Uí Fiachrach Aidhne, fl. 964.

Mac Comhaltan was an early member of the Ó Cléirigh family.

According to the Annals of the Four Masters, sub anno 964:

A victory was gained by Comhaltan Ua Cleirigh, i.e. lord of Ui-Fiachrach-Aidhne, and by Maelseachlainn, son of Arcda, over Fearghal Ua Ruairc, where seven hundred were lost, together with Toichleach Ua Gadhra, lord of South Luighne.

He may have been a brother of Eoghan Ua Cleirigh, Bishop of Connaught, who died in 967.

A close relative was Giolla Ceallaigh mac Comhaltan, from whom descend the family of Kilkelly.

Preceded by ?	King of Uí Fiachrach Aidhne fl.964	Succeeded by ?
