= Jerome A. Fahey =

Irish priest and writer

Father Jerome A. Fahey, MRIA, (1843–1919), was an Irish priest and writer.

== Life ==
Fahey was born at Killomoran, Gort, and educated in the town's national school and St. Jarlath's, Tuam. He studied at St. Patrick's College, Maynooth from 1860, and was ordained there in 1867. He served in various parishes such as Ennistymon, Lisdoonvarna, Ballinderreen and Ardrahan. In 1876 he was appointed parish priest at Peterswell, County Galway and remained there till his death in 1919.

He worked with Lady Gregory in promoting the Irish language. He was elected to the Royal Irish Academy in 1910 and was a founder member of the Galway Archaeological and Historical Society.

He died on 15 March 1919 and is buried in the cemetery of St. Colman's Church, Gort.

== Select Bibliography ==
- Church History in XX Century, 1872
- History and Antiquities of the Diocese of Kilmachduagh, Dublin, 1893.
- The Will and Way, Dublin, 1915
- Sanctuaries of the Corrib, The Holy Hermit of Burren (pamphlets)
