= Mac Comhaltan Ua Cleirigh =

Mac Comhaltan Ua Cleirigh was King of Uí Fiachrach Aidhne, fl. 998.

According to the Annals of the Four Masters, sub anno 998:

Diarmaid, son of Dunadhach, lord of Sil-Anmchadha, was slain by Mac Comhaltan Ua Cleirigh, lord of Aidhne.

In the following year, 999, he would as an ally of Brian Boru accompanied him on the following expedition:

A great hosting by Brian, son of Ceinneidigh, with the chiefs and forces of South Connaught, with the men of Osraige and Leinster, and with the foreigners of Ath Cliath, to proceed to Teamhair; but the foreigners set out before them, with a plundering party of cavalry, into Magh Breagh, where Maelseachlainn opposed them; and a spirited battle was fought between them, in which the foreigners were defeated, and only a few of them escaped. Brian afterwards proceeded to Fearta-neimbeadh in Magh-Breagh, but returned back without battle, without plundering, without burning. This was the first turning of Brian and the Connaughtmen against Maelseachlainn.

| Preceded by Comhaltan Ua Clerigh | King of Uí Fiachrach Aidhne fl.998 | Succeeded by Gilla Ceallaigh Ua Cleirigh |
