= Muirchertach Nár mac Guairi =

Muirchertach Nár mac Guairi (died 668) was a possible King of Connacht from the Ui Fiachrach Aidhne branch of the Connachta. He was the son of Guaire Aidne mac Colmáin (died 663), famous in Irish sagas.

The Irish king lists such as contained in The Book of Leinster do not list Muirchertach as king but have instead Cenn Fáelad mac Colgan (died 682) as the successor to Guaire. Only the Chronicum Scotorum of the Irish annals mentions him as king of Connacht in his death obit. A number of annals record the death of his brother Cellach in 666 however during the plague years.

The Annals of Innisfallen records an event under the year 665 in which the Connachta fought a battle with the Munstermen at Loch Fén (Loughfane, Limerick, Co.) but there is no mention of who won or whether it was fought by the Connachta or just the Ui Fiachrach Aidhne.

== See also ==
- Kings of Connacht

Preceded by Ceallach mac Guaire	King of Uí Fiachrach Aidhne; 665–668	Succeeded by Fergal Aidne mac Artgaile
