= Gilla Ceallaigh Ua Cleirigh =

Irish king, died 1003

Gilla Ceallaigh Ua Cleirigh (died 1003) was King of Ui Fiachrach Aidhne.

Gilla Ceallaigh was the next-to-last of the Ua Cleirigh kings of Aidhne. From this time on, the family lost power and eventually became an ecclesiastical family. Members included:

- Conchobhar Ua Cleirigh, lector of Kildare, died 1126
- Gilla Isa Ó Cléirigh, Bishop of Leyny (Achonry), died 1230

His descendants would eventually become the Ó Cléirigh Bardic family.

Preceded by Mac Comhaltan Ua Cleirigh	King of Uí Fiachrach Aidhne ?-1003	Succeeded by Mael Ruanaidh na Paidre Ua hEidhin
