= Tighearnach mac Cathmogha =

Tighearnach mac Cathmogha (died 822) was King of Uí Fiachrach Aidhne.

| Preceded by Cathal Aidhne mac Ailell | King of Uí Fiachrach Aidhne; 812–822 | Succeeded by Uathmharan mac Brocan |
