= Mael Fabhaill Ua hEidhin =

Historic Irish regional king

Mael Fabhaill Ua hEidhin (died 1048) was King of Ui Fiachrach Aidhne.

Mael Fabhaill succeeded Mhic Mac Comhaltan Ua Cleirigh. Events which occurred during his reign included:

- 1033. A conflict between the Eli and the Ui-Fiachrach Aidhne, in which Braen Ua Cleirigh and Muireadhach Mac Gillaphadraig, with many others, were slain.
- 1048. The son of Donnchadh Gott, royal heir of Teamhair, and Ua hEidhin, lord of Ui-Fiachrach-Aidhne, died.

In 1048, Mael Fabhaill Ua hEidhin, lord of Ui-Fiachrach-Aidhne, died.

Preceded by Mhic Mac Comhaltan Ua Cleirigh	King of Uí Fiachrach Aidhne; 1025-1048	Succeeded by Gilla na Naomh Ua hEidhin
