= Ollie Kilkenny =

Irish hurler

Personal information
- Born: 7 February 1962 (age 64) Kiltormer, County Galway
- Occupation: Nurse
- Height: 5 ft 11 in (180 cm)

Sport
- Sport: Hurling
- Position: Corner-back
Club
- Years: Club
- Kiltormer
Inter-county
- Years: County
- 1980s-1990s: Galway
Inter-county titles
- Connacht titles: 0
- All-Irelands: 2
- NHL: 2

Ollie Kilkenny (born 7 February 1962) is a former Irish sportsperson. He played hurling with his local club Kiltormer and with the Galway senior inter-county team in the 1980s and 1990s. Kilkenny won back-to-back All-Ireland winners' medals with Galway in 1987 and 1988.

== See also ==
- Giolla Ceallaigh mac Comhaltan, fl. 10th century, ancestor of Kilkelly clan of Galway.
- Padhraic Mac Giolla Chealla, poet and seanchai, fl. 1798.
