= Eoghan Ó hEidhin =

Eoghan Ó hEidhin (died 1340) was King of Uí Fiachrach Aidhne.

Eoghan is the last person named as ruler of all Uí Fiachrach Aidhne in the annals. The previous person so named was Owen Ó hEidhin who died in 1253. The Irish annals list two possible rulers in the interim:

- 1263. Mael Fabhill Ó hEidhin was slain by the English.
- 1326. Nicholas Ó hEidhin died.

However, neither is specifically stated as being king.

According to the annals, "Eoghan ... was slain by his own kinsmen." No further details are given. His family would remain rulers of the sub-district of Coill Ua bhFhiachrach till displaced in the 1650s by the Cromwellian administration. However, as late as 1840 there was a recognised head of the family, living near Kinvara.

Regnal titles
Preceded by Owen Ó hEidhin	King of Uí Fiachrach Aidhne before ?–1340	Vacant
