= Jamie Kilstein =

American writer, radio host, and stand-up comic

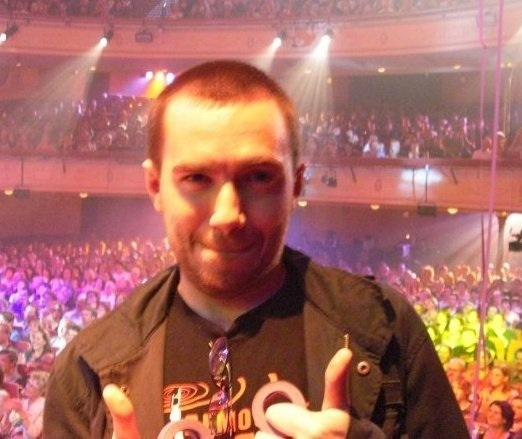
- Kilstein at the 2009 Melbourne Comedy Gala
- Born: Jamie Alexander Kilstein; May 17, 1982 (age 44); Pennington, New Jersey, U.S.
- Occupations: Comedian, media pundit, blogger, musician, radio personality
- Spouse: Allison Kilkenny (divorced)

Jamie Alexander Kilstein (born May 17, 1982) is an American writer, radio host, and stand-up comic. He grew up in Pennington, New Jersey. He lives in Austin, TX.

== Career ==
=== Writing ===
Kilstein's writing has appeared on left-leaning sites including Wonkette, which featured a recurring column in summer 2012 titled Sundays with Jamie Kilstein and the Lord. The column covered topics like pundits' penchant for overusing 9/11 analogies and "anchor babies". In September 2013, Kilstein came out publicly as suffering from both alcoholism and an eating disorder in a front-page article for Jezebel, "I'm an Alcoholic Dude With an Eating Disorder. Hi."

He and Allison Kilkenny (his Citizen Radio co-host and wife at the time) wrote the book Newsfail, which was released on October 14, 2014. The book covers topics including Palestine, trans rights, feminism, atheists, and factory farming.

=== Comedy ===
Kilstein's first comedy album, Please Buy My Jokes, was recorded on February 23, 2008, in front of a live audience at the Lakeshore Theater in Chicago. It was released in 2008. His second comedy album, Zombie Jesus, was also recorded at the Lakeshore Theater in Chicago, on September 11–13, 2008. It was released on October 27, 2009. Kilstein released his third album, Libel, Slander, and Sedition, on September 13, 2011. It was recorded at the Acme Comedy Company in Minneapolis, Minnesota, October 13–16, 2010.

Kilstein made his U.S. debut TV appearance on February 2, 2011, on the talk show Conan, on which he performed a stand-up routine critical of continued involvement in the Iraq War.

Kilstein's fourth comedy album, What Alive People Do, was released on October 22, 2013. It was a double album recorded in front of an Austin audience at the New Movement Theater on December 2, 2012.

He is heavily influenced by comedian and actor Robin Williams who helped him through tough times.

== Controversy ==
On February 27, 2017, Kilstein announced on that day's Citizen Radio episode that he was leaving the show. Later that day, his co-host and ex-wife Allison Kilkenny accused Kilstein of inappropriate behavior associated with the show. On October 30, 2017, Kilstein clarified on The Joe Rogan Experience that he and Kilkenny had been in an open relationship.
