= Allison Kilkenny =

American journalist (born 1983)

- Born: 1983 (age 42–43); United States
- Education: Illinois State University
- Occupations: Journalist, columnist, performer
- Spouse: Jamie Kilstein (divorced)

Allison Kilkenny (born 1983) is an American comedy writer and performer, former journalist, and host of the political podcast Light Treason News. Kilkenny previously hosted Citizen Radio and for many years was a social critic and blogger for The Nation. Kilkenny covered "budget wars, activism, uprising, dissent and general rabble-rousing". Kilkenny is best known for her contributions to political and comedy websites like the Huffington Post, Reductress, Talking Points Memo, 23/6, the Beast, Counterpunch, The Nation, and Alternet.org. Her work has been also featured on W. Kamau Bell's blog. Since 2018, Kilkenny hosts the podcast Light Treason News and is a performer and sketch writer at the Upright Citizens Brigade Theatre.

== Background ==
Kilkenny grew up in Naperville, Illinois. She attended Illinois State University, graduating in 2005 with a major in English. Kilkenny moved to New York City, where she met her ex-husband Jamie Kilstein at a chain bookstore where the two were employed. She currently resides in Brooklyn. Kilkenny is an outspoken atheist and activist. She is a vegan.

Kilkenny said her political awakening was sparked by reading works by Howard Zinn and Noam Chomsky. She also credits Democracy Now's Amy Goodman as an inspiration to more political thought.

== Works and career ==
Kilkenny was described in 2012 as a "fast-rising radio and print reporter-columnist." Her journalist career has come about entirely on the Internet. The Daily Kos called her "among the handful of youngish political journalists to have gained a solid readership by the direct and unorthodox means of the blogosphere."

She co-wrote a non-fiction political book with her ex-husband Jamie Kilstein, #NEWSFAIL, which Kilstein says will covered trans* issues, Palestine, factory farming, and feminism.

Kilkenny has appeared as a guest and as an expert on television shows including Countdown with Keith Olbermann, Melissa Harris-Perry, The Majority Report, WMNF 88.5 FM, Democracy Now, Abby Martin and other shows to discuss labor issues, LGBT issues, Occupy Wall Street and activism.

An outspoken critic of establishment media, Kilkenny has been quoted as having a pessimistic view of her own chosen profession. "The news exists to turn a profit," she told Barrett Brown for the Daily Kos in 2008.

Kilkenny began her career writing political rants for blogs, but did not start getting paid until her work took more of an investigative turn.

=== Citizen Radio ===
Kilkenny started Citizen Radio in 2008. The podcast grew from a once-weekly program to popular show released every weekday in 2008. Before that, Kilkenny co-hosted a podcast Drunken Politics, which was associated with Breakthru Radio. Kilkenny says the show's format, which mixed equal parts news stories and dark humor, is partially a coping mechanism. "People cope with difficult news in their own ways, and our way is through humor, namely so our audience doesn’t start offing themselves, one-by-one," she said in an interview with In These Times.

=== Occupy Wall Street ===
Kilkenny was one of a small group of journalists that started reporting on Occupy Wall Street during its first days, filing a report from Zuccotti Park on September 17, 2011. In May 2011, months before the Occupy movement began, Kilkenny expressed her admiration for the union protesters who occupied the Wisconsin State Capitol building. "That’s the only type of protest that matters anymore: occupy and refuse to leave. It scares the hell out of the politicians and the media loves the drama, so they’re more likely to cover it," she said. Though her initial coverage described a scene with lukewarm reception, Kilkenny continued to report on the occupation of Zuccotti Park, while chiding larger organizations like The New York Times for "abysmal coverage." In her response, Kilkenny points out glaring omissions from the NYT's first coverage of Occupy, which failed to mention NYPD's documented macing of protestors. "For every batshit-crazy quote Bellafante presents, I can match it with a calm, articulate response from another attendee. I guarantee that," Kilkenny wrote.

Kilkenny estimates she spent "more than a hundred hours wandering through the encampment and interviewing dozens of protesters at great length."

Throughout the fall and winter of 2011, Kilkenny continued to cover developments in the Occupy movement, including actions in Chapel Hill, North Carolina, Los Angeles, Boston, and New York City.

Kilkenny was one of two journalists featured on a panel about the "state of Occupy" in February 2012.

Kilkenny received positive feedback both from mainstream news sources, and from hordes of Twitter followers during the "occupation" for up-to-the-minute news from the park. According to some sources, Kilkenny received hundreds of followers a week throughout the physical occupation of Zuccotti Park. One of her articles from her time covering the movement, "Youth Surviving Subprime" was featured in The Nation's book Meltdown: How Greed and Corruption Shattered Our Financial System and How We Can Recover.

=== Light Treason News ===
In 2018, Kilkenny launched Light Treason News, a now-weekly recap podcast that covers pop culture and news. She's interviewed guests such as: Mitski, Paul F. Tompkins, Boots Riley, Melissa Harris-Perry, and Sarah Kendzior.

=== Reductress ===
Kilkenny is a regular contributor to the satirical comedy website Reductress.

=== Upright Citizens Brigade Theatre ===
Kilkenny has been a house team performer at the Upright Citizens Brigade Theatre since 2018 and is currently on the improv Harold team Promises.

== Criticism ==
G. Gordon Liddy replied to a tweet by Kilkenny, telling Kilkenny that her writing made him want to vomit. Kilkenny said the tweet was unprovoked and came from out of the blue.

Matthew Vadum, author of Subversion Inc, said Kilkenny and her ex-husband Kilstein misrepresented an opinion piece Vadum wrote for American Thinker, accusing her of a "knee-jerk" reaction.

== Personal life ==
Kilkenny married comedian and radio host Jamie Kilstein (now divorced) on June 7, 2010.
