= Domhnall mac Lorcan =

Domhnall mac Lorcan (died 937) was King of Uí Fiachrach Aidhne, Ireland.

Sub anno 937, the Annals of the Four Masters states Domhnall, son of Lorcan, lord of Aidhne, died at Cluain mic Nois.

Preceded by Mael Macduach	King of Uí Fiachrach Aidhne fl.964	Succeeded by Comhaltan Ua Cleirigh
