= Justin Campbell (hurler) =

Irish hurler

Personal information
- Native name: Saerbhreathach Mac Cathmhaoil (Irish)
- Born: 1970 (age 55–56) Kiltormer, County Galway, Ireland
- Occupation: Addiction counsellor

Sport
- Sport: Hurling
- Position: Centre-forward
Club
- Years: Club
- Kiltormer
Club titles
- Galway titles: 2
- Connacht titles: 2
- All-Ireland Titles: 1
Inter-county
- Years: County
- 1992-1999: Galway
Inter-county titles
- All-Irelands: 0
- NHL: 0
- All Stars: 0

Justin Campbell (born 1970) is an Irish former hurler who played as a centre-forward at senior level for the Galway county team.

== Career ==
Born in Kiltormer, County Galway, Campbell first arrived on the inter-county scene when he first linked up with the Galway minor team, before later joining the under-21 side. He joined the senior panel for the 1992 championship. Campbell went on to play a key role for Galway for the rest of the decade, however, he won few trophies. He was an All-Ireland runner-up on one occasion.

At club level Campbell is a one-time All-Ireland medallist with Kiltormer. In addition to this he also won two Connacht medals and two championship medals.

In retirement from playing Campbell has become involved in team management and coaching. He was appointed manager of the Roscommon senior hurling team in 2013.

In 2015 he led Roscommon to a second Nicky Rackard Cup title. He was later appointed manager of the Connachat hurling team.

== Honours ==
=== Team ===
Kiltormer

- All-Ireland Senior Club Hurling Championship (1): 1992
- Connacht Senior Club Hurling Championship (2): 1990, 1991
- Galway Senior Club Hurling Championship (2): 1990, 1991

Galway

- All-Ireland Under-21 Hurling Championship (1): 1991

=== Management ===
Roscommon

- Nicky Rackard Cup (1): 2015

Sporting positions
| Preceded by Séamus Qualter | Roscommon Senior Hurling Manager; 2013-present | Succeeded by Incumbent |
