= Néide mac Onchú =

Neide mac Onchu fl. c. 800 was an Irish lord.

== Biography ==
Neidhe son of Onchu son of Finnlugh was described as the Cú Chulainn of the Conmaicne in an account of the battle of Ardrahan, which took place sometime about 800.

The Conmhaicne (descendants of Conmhac) were an ethnic group divided into a number of distinct branches that scattered around Ireland in the early medieval period. They take their name from a mythical ancestor known as Conmhac ("hound son"), a son of Fergus mac Róich,.

Neide's branch of the Conmaicne were located in the district once known as Trícha Máenmaige, centred on Loughrea, within which is the parish of Kilconickny (church of the Conmaicne). The Conmaicne Maonmhagh were located some distance from the other branches of the tribe, who were in north and west County Galway.

According to the account:

is hé tuc cath Arddo Rathain ind Úib Fiachrach Aidhni co tinól na Conmacne uimmi agus is ann romarbad Eidinn mac Clérigh agus sochaidi mille friss
it was he who waged the battle of Ard Rathain in Uí Fhiachrach Aidhne when he gathered the Conmhaicne around him. It was here that Eidhean mac Cléirigh was killed along with a great host.
