= Seán Ó Ceallaigh =

Seán Ó Ceallaigh may refer to:

- Seán T. O'Kelly (1882–1966), second President of Ireland (1945–1959).
- Seán Ó Ceallaigh (Clare politician) (1896–1994), Irish Fianna Fáil politician from County Clare
- John J. O'Kelly (1873–1957), known as "Sceilg", Irish politician, author and publisher.
