= Giolla Ceallaigh mac Comhaltan =

Giolla Ceallaigh mac Comhaltan (fl. 10th century) was an ancestor to the MacGiolla Ceallaigh (Kilkelly family of County Galway).

Giolla Cellaigh - devotee of Saint Ceallaigh - was a member of the Uí Fiachrach Aidhne of south Galway, and was a six-time great-grandson of Guaire Aidne mac Colmáin, King of Connacht (died 663). He was a son of Comhaltan mac Maol Cúlaird, who was likewise related to Seachnasach mac Donnchadh, Scannlán mac Fearghal, Eidhean mac Cléireach, and Cathal mac Ógán, who gave their names to the families of Ó Seachnasaigh, Ó Scannláin, Ó Cléirigh, Ó hEidhin and Ó Cathail.

MacLysaght states

This family were hereditary olaves (ollamh) to the O'Flahertys. The name is sometime abbreviated to Kelly with the resultant confusion.

The family are mentioned in this regard in the medieval text Crichaireacht cinedach nduchasa Muintiri Murchada.
