= Reductress =

American feminist satire website

- Type: Feminist satirical magazine
- Format: Website
- Founders: Beth Newell; Sarah Pappalardo
- Founded: April 2013; 13 years ago
- Headquarters: Flatiron District, Manhattan, New York, US
- Website: reductress.com

Reductress is an American satire website that parodies the style, tone, and perspective of media targeted towards women, especially women's magazines. Founded in 2013 by comedians Beth Newell and Sarah Pappalardo, the site has received praise from reviewers for its satirical pieces including advice columns, news stories, and listicles.

== History ==
Beth Newell began taking classes and performing at the Upright Citizens Brigade (UCB) in 2005, later teaching at New York's Magnet Theater. Sarah Pappalardo was a comedy performer and writer while attending college in Chicago and worked as a freelance writer. The two founded Reductress in April 2013 after a conversation between Newell and Pappalardo about tropes they observed in popular media targeted towards women. By August 2016, the site reached 1.7 million monthly global visits, with a record monthly readership of 2.4 million hits in November 2014. In 2016, in response to a comedian being banned from the UCB after being accused of rape and sexual assault by multiple women, Reductress dedicated its entire landing page to stories satirizing the tactics of rapists and rape culture. The website has an office in the Flatiron District of Manhattan, New York.

In October 2016, Reductress released the book How to Win at Feminism: The Definitive Guide to Having It All—And Then Some! Written by Newell, Pappalardo, and Anna Drezen, the book was published by HarperOne.

In May 2023, Reductress released the book How to Stay Productive When the World Is Ending: Productivity, Burnout, and Why Everyone Needs to Relax More Except You with Andrews McMeel Publishing.

== Style and content ==
Reductress is a feminist news satire site. Conceived as a parody of women's magazines and the clickbait headlines they often employ, the site gradually expanded its focus to satirizing the ways women's media attempt to capitalize on feminism while still espousing values "that make [women] feel inadequate." The site has also parodied aspects of feminism, such as white feminism or feminism that lacks awareness of privilege.

Reductress publishes satirical advice columns, news stories, confessionals, listicles, and profiles, paired with a stock photo. The style of its articles has been compared to that of The Onion. Newell and Pappalardo have expressed interest in creating more video content for the site.

Reductress also hosts a live stand-up comedy show called Haha...WOW.

== Reception ==
Gabe Dunn of The Daily Dot described Reductress as "not only biting, 'goes-there' hilarious, [but] a fantastic, sad, and much-needed look at the way the media talks down to women". Writing for The Guardian, Morwenna Ferrier said that the site's "headlines are cutting, but the comedy is sometimes subtle enough to dupe readers", citing the headline "We're Piercing My Baby's Tongue" as an example. Brian Raftery opined in Wired that Reductress "quickly became one of the funniest and most focused humor outlets on the web" with articles like "Actually, I'm an Intersectional Men's Rights Activist" and "How to Friendzone Ethan While He's Still Inside You". Particular praise was levied for Reductress's August 2016 series of articles regarding rape which were viewed as a powerful reaction to a national pattern of sexual violence and a strong example of the power of humor to "confront even the most seemingly unseemly topics, so long as it's done with honesty, empathy, and a shit-ton of sagacious fury."

== See also ==
- List of satirical news websites
