= Cahill (disambiguation) =

Cahill is an Irish surname.

Cahill may also refer to:

- Cahill (group), a house music group from Liverpool
- 21410 Cahill, a minor planet
- Cahill Expressway, Sydney, Australia
- Cahill Racing, Indy car racing team
- Cahill Stadium, Summerside, Prince Edward Island, Canada
- Cahill U.S. Marshal, 1973 American Western film
- "Cahill" (Space Ghost Coast to Coast), a television episode
- Cahill–Keyes projection, a polyhedral map projection

== See also ==
- Cahill ministry (disambiguation)
- McCahill, a surname
