= Cahill =

Cahill (locally /ˈkɑːhɪl/, UK: /ˈkɑːhɪl/ or /ˈkeɪhɪl/) is a name of Irish origin. It is the anglicised version of the Gaelic "Ó Cathail" meaning "descendant of Cathal".

"Cathal" consists of two parts: "cath" means battle; the second could be "val" (rule), so that the name as a whole meant "battle ruler" or "strong in battle", or it could be "all" (great), so that the name as a whole meant "great warrior".

== People with the surname ==
Notable people with the surname include:

- Barry Cahill (actor) (1921–2012), Canadian-born actor
- Barry Cahill (Gaelic footballer) (born 1981), Irish Gaelic football player
- Becky Cahill (born 1983) UK Radio Newsreader
- Bernard J. S. Cahill (1866–1944), American architect and cartographer
- Brendan J. Cahill (born 1963), American catholic bishop
- Charles Cahill (ice hockey) (1904–1954), Canadian ice hockey player
- Charles Cahill (rugby league) (1916–2007), Australian rugby league footballer and coach
- Christina Cahill (née Boxer, born 1957), British middle-distance athlete
- Darren Cahill (born 1965), Australian tennis player and coach
- Eddie Cahill (born 1978), American actor
- Edward Cahill (priest) (1868–1941), Irish Jesuit priest and academic
- Edward Cahill (pianist) (1885–1975), Australian concert pianist
- Edward Cahill (jurist) (1843–1922), justice of the Michigan Supreme Court in 1890
- Ellen Cahill (1863–1934), street singer also known as "Killarney Kate"
- Emmet Cahill (born 1990), Irish tenor, member of Celtic Thunder
- Erin Cahill (born 1980), American actress
- Frank S. Cahill (1876–1934), Canadian politician
- Gary Cahill (born 1985), English football player
- George F. Cahill (1869–1935), American inventor
- Holger Cahill (1887–1960), Icelandic-American Director of the US Federal Art Project
- Horace T. Cahill (1894–1976), American politician; Lieutenant Governor of Massachusetts 1939–1945
- Jackie Cahill (born 1957), Irish politician
- James Cahill (art historian) (1926–2014), American art historian
- James Cahill (snooker player), (born 1995) English snooker player
- James F. Cahill (1926–2008), American scuba diving pioneer, one of the first Navy Seals
- Joe Cahill (1920–2004), Irish republican and IRA leader
- John Cahill (footballer) (born 1940), Australian rules football player and coach
- John Baptist Cahill (1841–1910), English Roman Catholic Bishop of Portsmouth
- John T. Cahill (lawyer) (1903–1966), American lawyer and prosecutor
- Joseph Cahill (1891–1959), Australian politician, Premier of New South Wales 1952–1959
- Josh Cahill (born 1986), German-Czech aviation vlogger
- Julie McNally Cahill (born 1966), American creator of Gym Partner and Littlest Pet Shop
- Keenan Cahill (born 1995), teenager known for viral video
- Kevin A. Cahill (born 1955), American politician from New York; state representative
- Kymba Cahill (born 1980), Australian Radio Host
- Leo Cahill (1928–2018), American professional football coach
- Lily Cahill (1888–1955), American actress
- Mabel Cahill (1863–1905), Irish championship tennis player
- Máiría Cahill (born 1981), Irish politician
- Marie Cahill (1866–1933), Broadway stage actress
- Martin Cahill (1949–1994), Irish criminal
- Mary Beth Cahill (born 1954), American political figure, campaign manager for John Kerry
- Michael Cahill (born 1965/1966), Irish politician
- Michael T. Cahill, Dean of Brooklyn Law School
- Mike Cahill (tennis) (born 1952), American tennis player
- Mike Cahill (director) (born 1979), American filmmaker
- Ollie Cahill (born 1975), Irish professional football player
- Pat Cahill (born 1949), Texas High School football coach
- Patricia Cahill (drug smuggler) (born 1973), British teen, imprisoned in Thailand
- Patricia Cahill (singer) (1942–2022), Irish singer
- Pearse Cahill (1917–2011), Irish aviation pioneer
- Richard Cahill (fl. 1911–1912), English professional football player
- Richard T. Cahill Jr. (born 1971), American author of Hauptmann's Ladder (on Lindbergh kidnapping)
- Robert Ellis Cahill (1934–2005), American author
- Robyn Cahill, Australian politician
- Ronnie Cahill (1915–1992), American football player
- Rowan Cahill (born 1945), Australian historian and journalist
- Sarah Cahill (model) (born 1978), American beauty queen and model
- Sarah Cahill (pianist) (born 1960), American pianist, writer and radio host
- Ted Cahill (rugby league) (fl. 1950s), English rugby player
- Thaddeus Cahill (1867–1934), inventor of the telharmonium
- Thomas Cahill (1940–2022), American scholar and writer
- Thomas Cahill (bishop) (1913–1978), Australian Roman Catholic bishop
- Thomas W. Cahill (1864–1951), American soccer coach
- Tim Cahill (born 1979), Australian soccer player
- Tim Cahill (writer) (born 1943), American travel writer and magazine editor
- Tim Cahill (producer) (born 1966), creator of Gym Partner and Littlest Pet Shop
- Timothy P. Cahill (born 1959), American politician from Massachusetts; state treasurer
- Tom Cahill (American football) (1919–1992), football player and coach
- Tom Cahill (Australian politician) (1924–1983), Australian politician from New South Wales
- Trevor Cahill (born 1988), American baseball player
- William T. Cahill (1912–1996), American politician from New Jersey; US Representative

== Fictional characters ==
- Amy Cahill, Dan Cahill, Grace Cahill, Hope Cahill, Beatrice Cahill, Fiske Cahill, James Cahill, Henry Cahill, Olivia Cahill, Gideon Cahill, Luke Cahill, Katherine Cahill, Thomas Cahill, Jane Cahill, and Madeleine Cahill in The 39 Clues.
- Red Cahill, character in the In The Heat of the Night second-season episode "Walkout"
- J. D. Cahill, title character in the 1973 movie Cahill U.S. Marshal
- Alex Cahill, main character in Walker, Texas Ranger portrayed by Sheree J. Wilson
- Dr. Cahill, character in Futurama
- Jordan Cahill, character from Stuck in the Suburbs played by Taran Killam
- Terry Cahill from the Canadian film FUBAR
- Sean Cahill character from Suits played by Neal McDonough

== Entertainment ==
- Cahill (band), a dance-music group based in Liverpool, UK

== See also ==
- McCahill
