= Colman mac Duagh =

Irish saint

Saint Colman mac Duagh
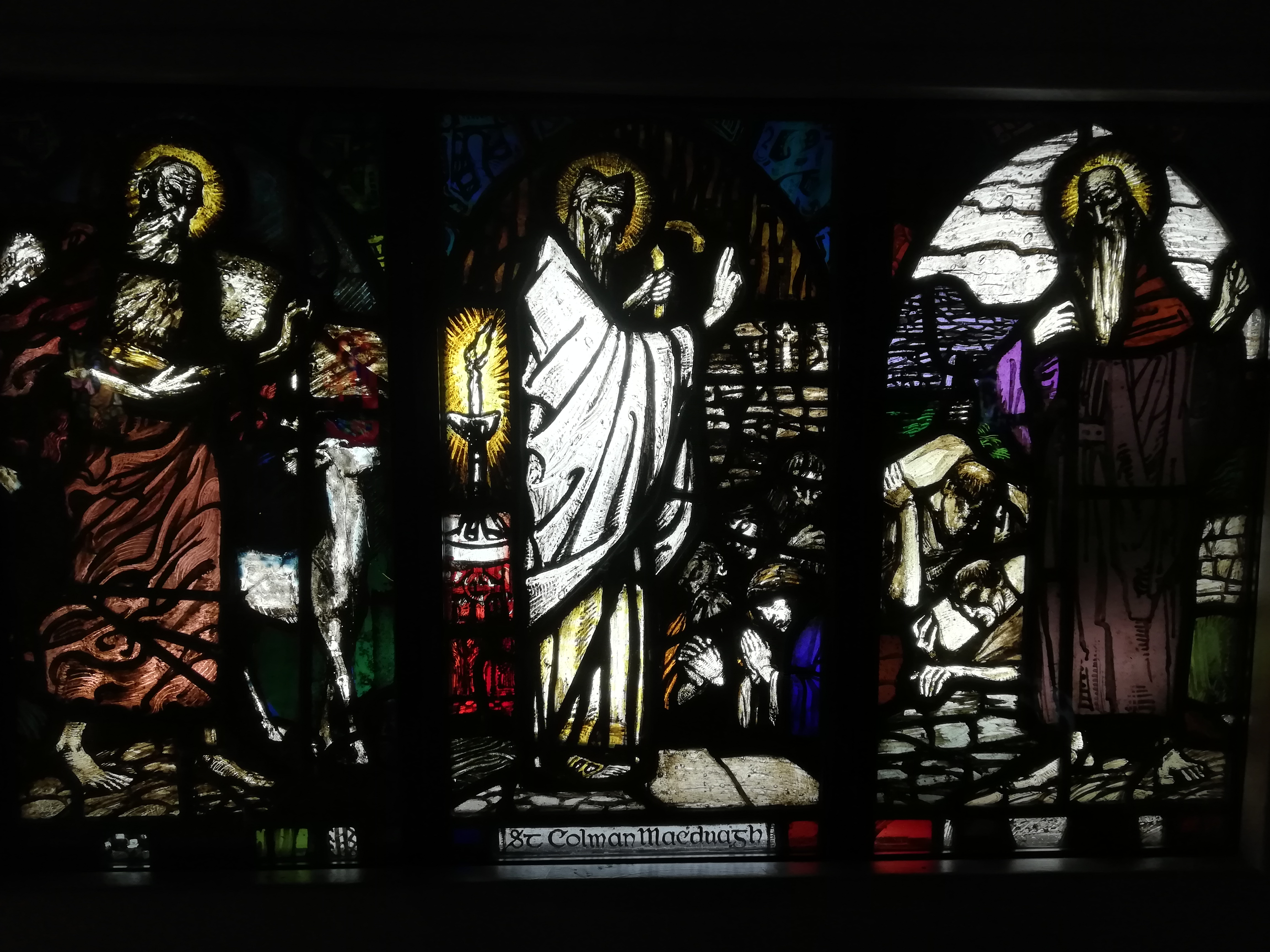
- Colman Mac Duagh depicted in stained glass by Wilhelmina Geddes (Hugh Lane Gallery)
- Born: 560; Corker, Kiltartan, County Galway, Ireland
- Died: 632 (aged 71–72)
- Venerated in: Roman Catholicism and Eastern Orthodoxy

Saint Colman mac Duagh (c. 560 – 29 October 632) was born at Corker, Kiltartan, County Galway, Ireland, the son of the Irish chieftain Duac (and thus, in Irish, mac Duach). He initially lived as a recluse, living in prayer and prolonged fastings, first on Inismore, then in a cave at the Burren in County Clare. With his relative, King Guaire Aidne mac Colmáin (d. 663) of Connacht he founded the monastery of Kilmacduagh, ("the church of the son of Duac"), and governed it as abbot-bishop.

He has been confused with Saint Colman of Templeshanbo (d. 595), who was from Connacht and lived somewhat earlier.

== Early life ==
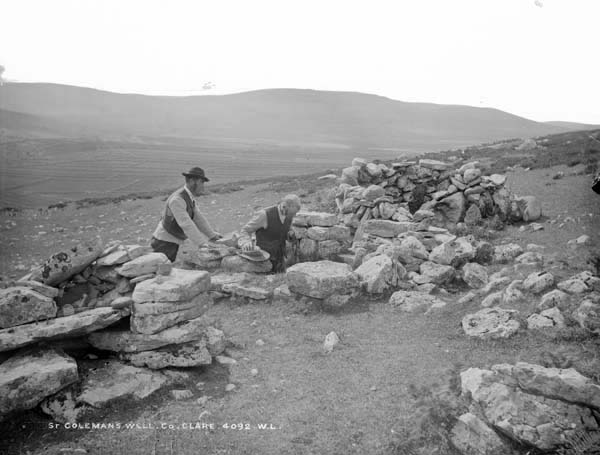
Saint Colman's well, c.1880–1900

St Colman was reportedly the son of Queen Rhinagh and her husband the chieftain Duac, born in Kiltartan, now County Galway.

== Priesthood ==
He was educated at Saint Enda's monastery on Inishmore/Árainn, the largest of the Aran Islands and lived there as a hermit. He built a church, Teampuill Mor Mhic Duagh, and a small oratory, Teampuill beg Mhic Duagh, near Kilmurvy. These form part of a group known as the Seven Churches, although the designation does not indicate the actual number of churches, many destroyed during the time of Cromwell.

Seeking greater solitude, around 590 he moved to the Burren, which was then covered in forest, accompanied by a servant. The hermitage is located in the townland of Keelhilla, part of the parish of Carran, at the foot of a cliff of Slieve Carran. Today the site consists of a small stone oratory, a holy well, Colman's shallow cave, the grave of his servant and a bullaun stone. These are now surrounded by hazel scrub. Since the oratory is made from stone, it cannot have been built by Colman, as in his time the churches were all built from wood.

King Guaire Aidne mac Colmáin had his principal place of residence at Kinvara, near the location of today's Dunguaire Castle. Upon learning of the hermitage, he was so impressed with Colman's holiness that he asked him to take episcopal charge of the territory of the Aidhne. In 610, Colman founded a monastery, which became the centre of the tribal Diocese of Aidhne, practically coextensive with the See of Kilmacduagh. This is now known as the monastery of Kilmacduagh.

Although reluctant to accept the title, Colman was ordained a bishop. His associates included Surney of Drumacoo. He died 29 October 632.

== Veneration ==
Although the "Martyrology of Donegal" assigns his feast to 2 February, yet the weight of evidence and the tradition of the diocese point to 29 October.

An annual pilgrimage to Colman's hermitage takes place on 21 October.

== Legends ==
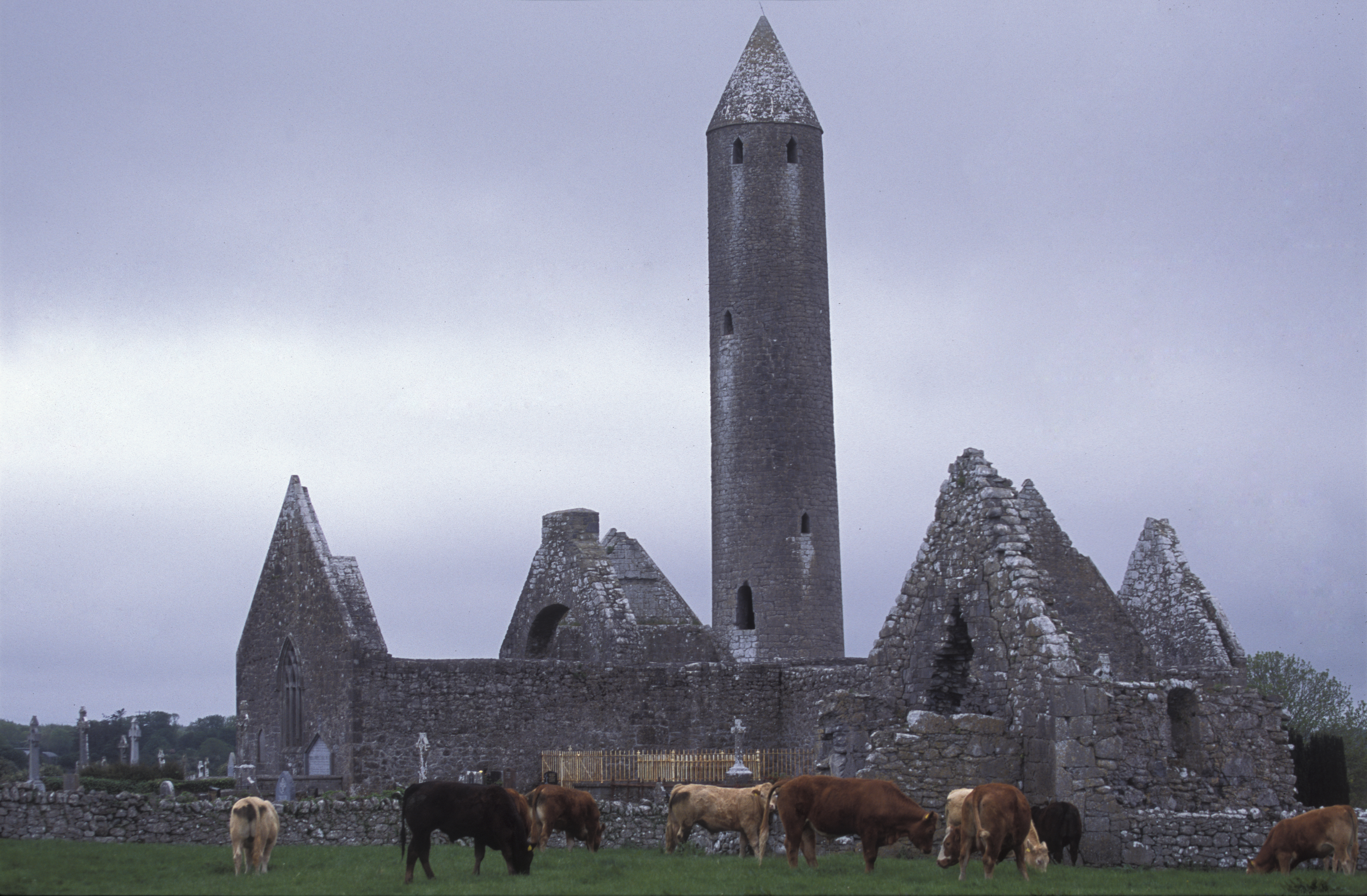
Kilmacduagh

While she carried the child in her womb, Colman's mother heard a prophecy that her son would be great man and surpass all others of his lineage. The pregnant Rhinagh, fearing her husband would seek to harm the child, fled. However, the king's men caught up to her and tried to drown her in the Kiltartin river by tying a stone around her neck. However, she was washed to shore. The rock with the rope marks is on display by the Kiltartin river.

Not long after she gave birth to Colman (c. 560), Rhinagh took her newborn to a priest to baptise, but they realised there was no water. Fearing to return home, the mother sheltered under an ash tree and prayed. A fountain bubbled up from the earth and Colman was baptised. That fountain is now the miraculous well of Colman mac duagh. Rhinagh entrusted her child to the care of monks.

According to the Menology of Aengus, after austere fasting throughout Lent, on Easter morning Colman inquired as to whether his servant had found anything special for their Easter meal. The servant replied that he only had a small fowl and the usual herbs. Perceiving that the servant's patience was near exhausted, Colman prayed that the Lord provide an appropriate meal. At the same time, Colman's cousin King Guaire was sitting down to a banquet. No sooner had the dishes been served than they were spirited away by unseen hands. The king and his retinue followed only to find the banquet spread before Colman and his servant. An area of limestone pavement nearby is called to this day Bohir na Maes or Bóthar na Mias, the "road of the dishes".

King Guaire bade him to build a monastery. Colman wanted God to show him where to build the monastery, and so asked God to give him a sign; later while walking through Burren woods, his cincture fell off. He took this to be God's sign and built the monastery on the place his cincture fell.

It is said that Colman declared that no person nor animal in the diocese of Kilmacduagh would ever die of lightning strike, something that appears true to this day, although we still do not know.

As with many relics, Colman's abbatial crozier has been used through the centuries for the swearing of oaths. Although it was in the custodianship of the O'Heynes of Kiltartan (descendants of King Guaire) and their relatives, the O'Shaughnessys, it can now be seen in the National Museum in Dublin (Attwater, Benedictines, Carty, D'Arcy, Farmer, MacLysaght, Montague, Stokes).

Other tales are recounted about Colman, who loved birds and animals. He had a pet rooster who served as an alarm clock at a time before there were such modern conveniences. The rooster would begin his song at the breaking of dawn and continue until Colman would come out and speak to it. Colman would then call the other monks to prayer by ringing the bells. But the monks wanted to pray during the night hours, too, and couldn't count on the rooster to awaken them at midnight and 3:00 am. So Colman made a pet out of a mouse that often kept him company in the night by giving it crumbs to eat. Eventually the mouse was tamed, and Colman asked its help in waking him for prayer.

It was a long time before Colman tested the understanding of the mouse. After a long day of preaching and travelling on foot, Colman slept very soundly. When he did not awake at the usual hour in the middle of the night for Lauds, the mouse pattered over to the bed, climbed on the pillow, and rubbed his tiny head against Colman's ear. Not enough to awaken the exhausted monk. So the mouse tried again, but Colman shook him off impatiently. Making one last effort, the mouse nibbled on the saint's ear and Colman immediately arose—laughing. The mouse, looking very serious and important, just sat there on the pillow staring at the monk, while Colman continued to laugh in disbelief that the mouse had indeed understood its job.

When he regained his composure, Colman praised the clever mouse for his faithfulness and fed him extra treats. Then he entered God's presence in prayer. Thereafter, Colman always waited for the mouse to rub his ear before arising, whether he was awake or not. The mouse never failed in his mission.

The monk had another strange pet: a fly. Each day, Colman would spend some time reading a large, awkward parchment manuscript prayer book. Each day the fly would perch on the margin of the sheet. Eventually Colman began to talk to the fly, thanked him for his company, and asked for his help:

"Do you think you could do something useful for me? You see yourself that everyone who lives in the monastery is useful. Well, if I am called away, as I often am, while I am reading, don't you go too; stay here on the spot I mark with my finger, so that I'll know exactly where to start when I come back. Do you see what I mean?"

So, as with the mouse, it was a long time before Colman put the understanding of the fly to the test. He probably provided the insect with treats as he did the mouse—perhaps a single drop of honey or crumb of cake. One day Colman was called to attend a visitor. He pointed the spot on the manuscript where he had stopped and asked the fly to stay there until he returned. The fly did as the saint requested, obediently remaining still for over an hour. Colman was delighted. Thereafter, he often gave the faithful fly a little task that it was proud to do for him. The other monks thought it was such a marvel that they wrote it down in the monastery records, which is how we know about it.

But a fly's life is short. At the end of summer, Colman's little friend was dead. While still mourning the death of the fly, the mouse died, too, as did the rooster. Colman's heart was so heavy at the loss of his last pet that he wrote to his friend Saint Columba. Columba reputedly responded:

"You were too rich when you had them. That is why you are sad now. Trouble like that only comes where there are riches. Be rich no more".

Colman then realised that one can be rich without any money (Curtayne-Linnane).

== See also ==
- Early Christian Ireland
