= Cléircheán of Saintclerans =

Cléircheán of Saintclerans, fl. 5th - 7th century?, Irish hermit.

Cléircheán is an obscure hermit who gave his name to Díseart Cléircheán (Saintclerns) in the parish of Lickerrig, County Galway. 'Díseart' is an Irish term denoting a desert or wilderness area inhabited by a hermit.

Cléircheán is a personal name derived from 'cleireach', meaning 'cleric', which in turn is borrowed from the Latin term 'clericus'.

Because the name is not referred to in ecclesiastical documents it is not possible to say which Cléircheán he was, nor to which era, does he belong.

The forename was used by the Uí Fiachrach Aidhne. One branch of the dynasty adopted the name Ó Cléirigh, who were among medieval Ireland's most esteemed historians.

Saintclerns was the childhood home of the actor Anjelica Huston.

== See also ==
- Antoine Ó Raifteirí
- Robert O'Hara Burke
- Anjelica Huston
