= Cathal Aidhne mac Ailell =

Irish king

Cathal Aidhne mac Ailell (died 812) was King of Uí Fiachrach Aidhne.

Preceded by Anluan mac Conchobhar	King of Uí Fiachrach Aidhne; 805–812	Succeeded by Tighearnach mac Cathmogha
