= McCahill =

McCahill is a surname of Irish origin. The name refers to:

== Persons ==
- Crystal McCahill (born 1983), Playboy Playmate of the month May 2009
- Jim McCahill (born 1939), English football chairman
- Mark P. McCahill (born 1956), American developer of internet technology
- Romy McCahill (born 1993), Scottish model and beauty pageant titleholder
- Tom McCahill (1907–1975), American automotive journalist

== See also ==
- Cahill (disambiguation)
