= Cenn Fáelad mac Colgan =

Cenn Fáelad mac Colgan (died 682) was a King of Connacht from the Uí Briúin branch of the Connachta. He was of the branch which developed into the Uí Briúin Seóla, who were centred on Tuam in modern County Galway. He is the first member of this branch mentioned in the annals.

The first mention of Cenn Fáelad in the annals is in the year 653 when the ally of the Ui Fiachrach Aidhne, Marcán mac Tomaini, the king of the Ui Maine was slain in battle in Iarthair Seola by Cenn Fáelad and Máenach mac Báethíne of the Uí Briúin. In the Annals of the Four Masters it is Maenach who is referred to as chief of the Uí Briúin.

The next mention of Cenn Fáelad is in 663 when the Annals of Tigernach mention that he became king of Connacht in succession to Guaire Aidne mac Colmáin. The king lists such as that in the Book of Leinster also place his reign after Guaire. However, the Chronicum Scotorum mentions the death of Muirchertach Nár mac Guairi as king of Connacht in 668. The annals also mention a certain Dub-Indracht mac Dúnchada as king of the Uí Briúin of Mag nAi in 666.

The last mention of Cenn Fáelad in the annals is in 682 when he was reputedly assassinated by Ulcha Dearg ua Caillidhe (also known as Redbeard) of the Conmaicne Cuile, a subject tribe of the Seóla region. Francis Byrne believed this killing was in response to the Uí Briúin policy of subjugation and annexation of subject tribal territories. Cenn Fáelad's descendants included the Muintir Murchadha and their chief, the O'Flaherty, through his son Amhalgadh, sometimes titled kings of Iarthair Connacht in the annals; and the Clann Cosgraigh, headed by McHugh, through Cenn Fáelad's son Dungalaigh.

== See also ==
- Kings of Connacht
