= Cahill ministry =

Cahill ministry may refer to:

- Cahill ministry (1952–1953)
- Cahill ministry (1953–1956)
- Cahill ministry (1956–1959)
- Cahill ministry (1959)
