= Fergal Aidne mac Artgaile =

King of Connacht

Fergal Aidne mac Artgaile (died 696) was a King of Connacht from the Ui Fiachrach Aidhne branch of the Connachta. He was the grandson of Guaire Aidne mac Colmáin, the hero of many Irish sagas, and was the last member of this branch to hold the overlordship of Connacht.

The kinglists have misplaced his reign by placing it after Cellach mac Rogallaig but the annals such as the Annals of Tigernach give him a reign after Dúnchad Muirisci mac Tipraite in the years 683–696. Nothing is recorded of his reign however.

The lines descended from Fergal (the Cenel Guairi) included the O'Heynes and O'Clearys while the O’Shaughnessys descended from his brother Aed (Cenel nAeda).

== See also ==
- Kings of Connacht

| Preceded by Muirchertach Nár mac Guairi | King of Uí Fiachrach Aidhne; 668–696 | Succeeded by Conchubhar mac Cumasgach |
| Preceded by Dúnchad Muirisci | King of Connacht; 683–696 | Succeeded by Muiredach Muillethan |
