= Don Coulton =

Australian rules footballer (1922–2000)

Personal information
- Full name: Don Coulton
- Born: 17 January 1922
- Died: 25 January 2000 (aged 78)
- Original team: Yarraville
- Height: 175 cm (5 ft 9 in)
- Weight: 83 kg (183 lb)

Playing career^{1}
Years	Club	Games (Goals)
1946	Footscray	7 (0)
1947	North Melbourne	6 (0)
Total		13 (0)
- ^{1} Playing statistics correct to the end of 1947.

Don Coulton (17 January 1922 – 25 January 2000) was an Australian rules footballer who played with Footscray and North Melbourne in the Victorian Football League (VFL).
