= Jimmy Kilkenny =

English footballer

Personal information
- Full name: James Kilkenny
- Date of birth: 21 November 1934
- Place of birth: Stanley, England
- Date of death: 1 April 2003 (aged 68)
- Place of death: Doncaster, England
- Position: Right half

Senior career*
Years	Team	Apps	(Gls)
19??–1952	Annfield Plain		
1952–1961	Doncaster Rovers	132	(1)
1961–19??	South Shields		
- * Club domestic league appearances and goals

James Kilkenny (21 November 1934 – 1 April 2003) was a footballer who played as a right half for Doncaster Rovers.

He started off playing for his local club Annfield Plain in the North Eastern League. As a 17-year-old, in 1952 he was signed by English second division club Doncaster Rovers, his debut being in a 3–2 home victory against Bristol City on 26 November 1955.

In a match against Liverpool in January 1957, he left Billy Liddell, the Liverpool captain, unconscious and having to leave the field needing three stitches in the head after an aerial duel.

His only league goal came in a 4–0 home victory over Port Vale on 20 April 1957, though he also scored an FA Cup goal in a 2–1 second round win at Tranmere Rovers on 6 December 1958. A serious bout of 'flu in December 1957 left him unfit to play until the following April.

Altogether, Kilkenny played 147 league and cup games for Doncaster, scoring two goals. At the end of the 1960–61 season he left to play for Northern Counties League side South Shields.
