= Patricia Cahill (drug smuggler) =

English drug smuggler

Patricia Ann Cahill (now Kendrick-Jones) and Karyn Joanne Smith are an English pair of convicted drug smugglers, having been arrested, charged and found guilty of attempting to smuggle nearly 26 kilos of heroin out of Thailand in July 1990.

Patricia Cahill (being a minor) could not be executed, which was the maximum sentence available under Thai law. At her trial in December 1990, she was found guilty and sentenced to 15 years in prison. Her case caused high-profile media coverage. Cahill was released from prison within three years after pressure from the British authorities.

== Background ==
Patricia Cahill was born in 1973 to Patrick Cahill and Frances Cahill and raised in West Heath, Birmingham to a working-class Catholic family of Irish immigrant origin. Cahill’s moral compass was at times throughout the investigation called into question; shortly after her arrest her father claimed to the BBC that Patricia was “dead against drugs, she was dead against abortions and things like that”, although Cahill had a previous criminal conviction of shoplifting in Birmingham at the time of her July 1990 arrest.

Karyn Smith was born in 1971 to Eric Smith, a hospital technician and Marilyn Smith and raised on the Damson Wood estate in Solihull by her working-class family. Smith was described by investigators as having been an “unusually naïve” girl. She had learning difficulties at school and had failed all her exams. Smith worked as a hairdresser.

Before their arrest in Bangkok in July 1990, neither girl was known to police as a drug-dealer or a drug-user. In April 1990, the two girls met and quickly became ”the best of friends”, although Smith would later allege she became friends with Cahill because she was homeless and depressed. Cahill and Smith’s parents did not meet each other until after the girls’ arrest. Both with a fondness with for nightclubbing, Cahill and Smith would go clubbing most weekends and frequented Birmingham’s trendy Dome nightclub, a popular nightclub in the city during the early 1990s. The relationship dynamic between the two was noted of being of interest by Smith’s lawyer in a dossier on the case; Smith was described as a “slow learner” while Cahill was perceived as the more “dominant partner in their relationship, owing to being “much more” intelligent, although the evidence for this lay with the fact Cahill had “several GCSEs” and “paid the bills”. The friendship was soon descend into engagement with petty crime; in June 1990 the pair faced a charge of stealing three dictaphones. Both Smith and Cahill failed to appear in court, and an arrest warrant had been issued.

== Arrest ==
Patricia Cahill (17yrs old) and her friend Karyn Smith (19yrs old) went to Thailand for a holiday, after a British man offered to pay their way. Her parents were not aware that she had left the country, and believed her to be in Scotland. At Bangkok International Airport their baggage was searched, and the drugs discovered. The quantity of heroin seized was, at the time, the largest in any haul ever. Throughout their trial, they maintained that the drugs had been planted on them, and that they had no knowledge that they were carrying anything illicit. However, in a later interview from prison, Smith confessed that she knew she was carrying something but she had no idea what exactly it was. "It could have been gold or ammunition. I did not know anything about drugs at that time.".

== Subsequent release ==
Despite accepting the verdict and sentence of the Thai courts, the government of Britain went to unusual measures to secure the release of Patricia Cahill, who, at the time of her offence was a minor.

The British embassy in Bangkok submitted a petition for a pardon from the King of Thailand to the Thai Ministry of Foreign Affairs. The embassy supported the petition on the grounds of Miss Cahill's youth and immaturity at the time the offence was committed.

== Film ==
The movie Brokedown Palace is claimed to be loosely based on the exploits of Patricia Cahill and Karyn Smith.
