= Padhraic Mac Giolla Chealla =

Irish poet and storyteller

Padhraic Mac Giolla Chealla, Irish poet and storyteller, fl. 1798.

Mac Giolla Chealla was a local poet who made a well-known prediction, of many years standing, "that the French were to come into Killala on the day of the Fair of Turloughmore."

By go, the day came in the end, the day it was said they wuld come and it was moving well into the day and there was no talk or mention of the French coming, no more than any other day. Padhraic was at the Fair, walking about for himself and a number of men met him whom he had told that they would surely come that day. 'Patrick, you stupid fellow', says one of them 'we have been listening to you for so long that they French were to come today and there is no sign of them yet.' 'Well don't brag yet', says Padhraic, 'the books haven't been closed yet.' It was true for him. Before it was midday the news was out that the French were inside in Killala.
