= Coulton =

Surname disambiguation

Coulton is an English surname that means "coal town" or "Cola's town". Notable people with the surname include:

- Charles Coulton (fl.1892), English footballer
- Don Coulton (1922–2000), Australian rules footballer
- Frank Coulton (1866–1929), English footballer
- G. G. Coulton, (1858–1947), British medievalist
- James Coulton, pseudonym of author Joseph Hansen
- John James Coulton (1940–2020), classical archaeologist
- Jonathan Coulton (born 1970), American folk-rock singer and songwriter
- Mark Coulton (born 1958), Australian politician
- Nicholas Coulton (born 1940), English solicitor and Anglican priest
- Ralph Coulton (died 1582), English priest, Archdeacon of Cleveland
- Shaun Coulton (born 1979), Australian rower
- Tom Coulton (born 1992), English footballer

== See also ==
- Coulton, North Yorkshire, a village in England
- Coulton Waugh, artist on the Dickie Dare comic strip
- Colton (surname)
