= Kiltormer =

Village in County Galway, Ireland

Coordinates: 53°14′N 8°16′W

Kiltormer (Irish: Cill Tormóir) is a village in County Galway, Ireland. It is about 8 miles from Ballinasloe. The village is in a civil parish of the same name.

Kiltormer GAA won the All-Ireland Hurling Championship title in 1992. The semi-final against Cashel King Cormacs from Tipperary was a three match series, and Kiltormer beat Birr in the final.

== See also ==
- List of towns and villages in Ireland
