= Guaire Aidne mac Colmáin =

Ancient Irish king

Guaire Aidne mac Colmáin (died 663) was a king of Connacht. A member of the Ui Fiachrach Aidhne and son of king Colmán mac Cobthaig (died 622). Guaire ruled at the height of Ui Fiachrach Aidne power in south Connacht.

== Early reign ==
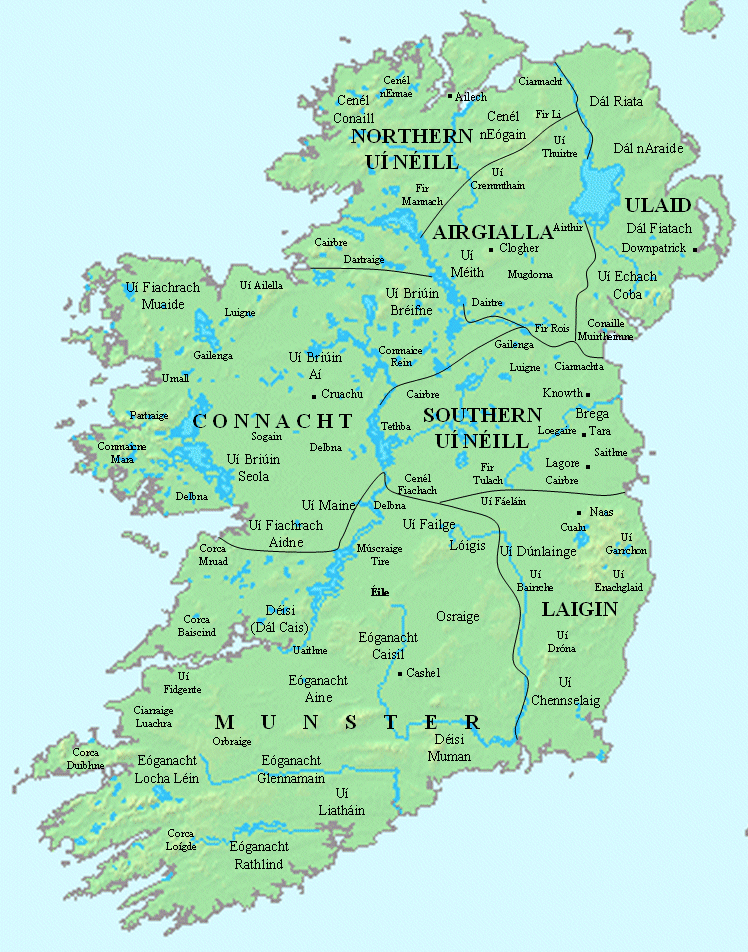
Early peoples and kingdoms of Ireland, c.800

Guaire appears to have succeeded his father as king of the Ui Fiachrach Aidhne in 622. In 629 was fought the Battle of Carn Feradaig (Carhernarry, County Limerick), where he suffered a defeat at the hands of the Munster king Faílbe Flann mac Áedo Duib (died 639). His ally Conall mac Máele Dúib of the Ui Maine was slain. According to Keating, Guaire's reason for this campaign was to recover the Thomond region from Munster. Prof. Byrne believes that this defeat marked the true expansion of the Déisi Tuisceart into Thomond. He also states that this defeat may have paved the way for Rogallach mac Uatach (died 649) in acquiring the overlordship of Connacht.

== Carn Conaill ==
The next event recorded of Guaire in the annals is the Battle of Carn Conaill (in his home territory near Gort) in 649. In this battle he was put to flight by the high-king Diarmait mac Áedo Sláine (died 665) of Brega. Diarmait was the aggressor in this war and the saga Cath Cairnd Chonaill gives much detail of this affair. Diarmait won the support of the monastery of Clonmacnoise and refused the request of Cumméne Fota (died 662), the abbot of Clonfert, for a truce; who had been sent by Guaire to ask for one. Also Caimmín, abbot of Inis Celtra, put a curse on Guaire before the battle. However, Guaire was able to turn his defeat into a moral victory when upon submitting to Diarmait he outdid the high-king with his generosity to the poor. Diarmait granted him a peace treaty and friendship.

Also according to the saga, the following Munster allies of Guaire were slain in this battle: the king of Munster Cúán mac Amalgado (died 641) (called Cúán mac Éndai in the saga); Cúán mac Conaill, king of the Uí Fidgenti; and Tolomnach, king of the Uí Liatháin. Byrne believes this is not probable however; based on Cúán mac Amalgado's death date in the annals and on the improbability of the Uí Liathain being involved in a conflict far from their territory in South Munster. The Annals of Ulster and Annals of Innisfallen do not mention the Munster connection but the saga tradition is preserved in the Annals of Tigernach. Interaction with the Ui Fidgenti are evidenced by the 8th century poem The Lament of Créide, a poem written about his daughter's lament for a young man of the Ui Fidgenti.

== Guaire in Irish sagas ==
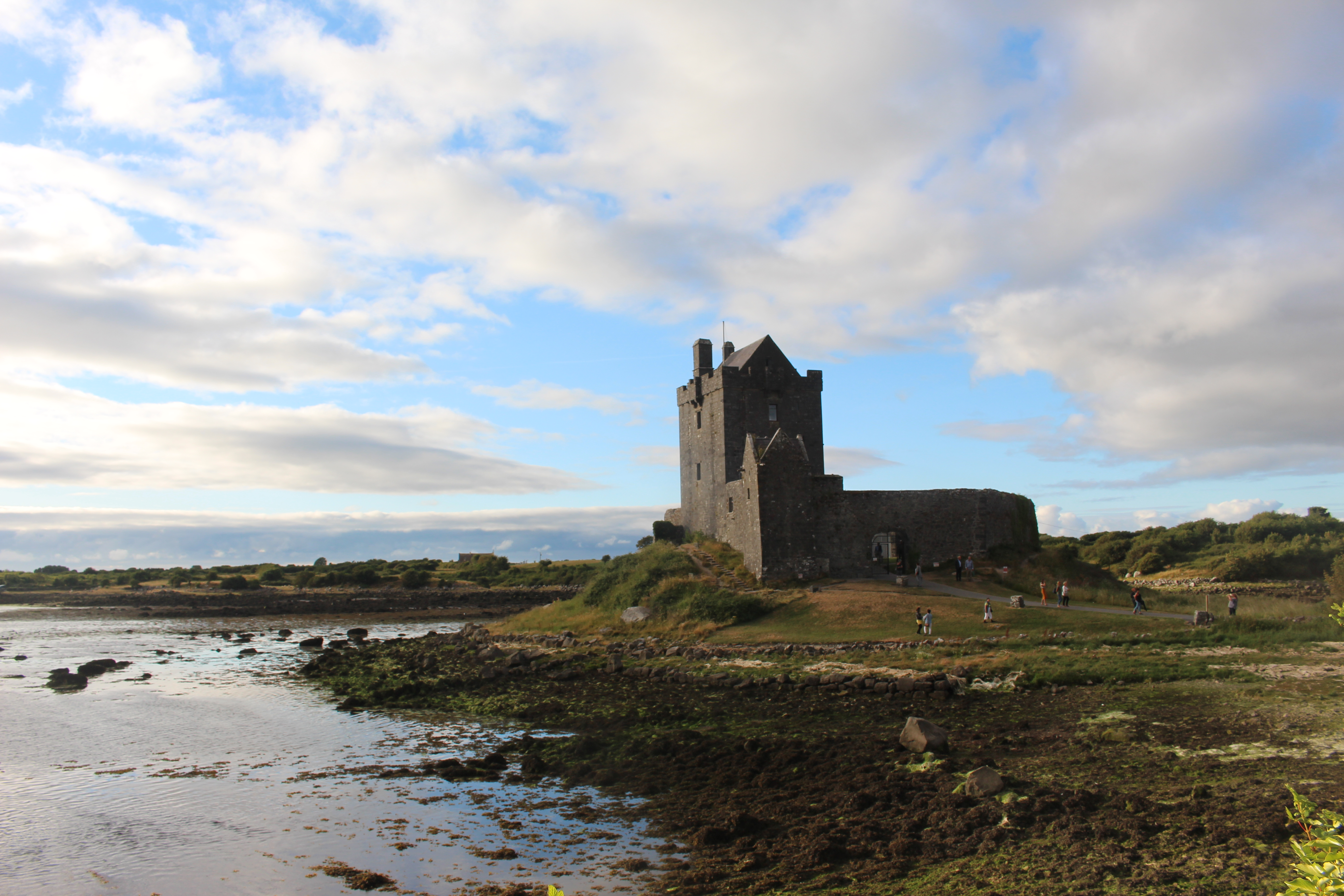
Dunguaire Castle built on the site of Guaire's original residence

Anecdotes are told about his relations with such saints as Cumméne Fota of Clonfert, Caimmín of Inis Celtra, and Colmán mac Duach of Kilmacduagh. He also was associated with the church at Tuam Gréine (Tuamgraney) and was ancestor of two 8th century abbots there. He seems to have patronised the expansion of West Munster saints up the Shannon. For this reason, Byrne believes his influence must have extended into parts of Munster including overlordship of Corco Mruad and Corco Baiscind tribes in Thomond and actual holdings in the later territory of Dál gCais.

In the saga Scéla Cano meic Gartnáin (The Story of Cano mac Gartnain) the exiled prince of Dalriada comes to live at his court for a while where Guaire's daughter Créide falls in love with him. Creide however was married to Marcán mac Tommáin (died 653) the king of the Ui Maine. According to the c.1300 tale called Tromdámh Guaire (The Heavy Company of Guaire) or Imtheacht na Tromdhaimhe (The Proceedings of the Great Bardic Institution Guaire was visited by the Chief Ollam of Ireland, Senchán Torpéist who was accompanied by one hundred and fifty other poets, one hundred and fifty pupils "with a corresponding number of women-servants, dogs, etc".

== Later years and legacy ==
Guaire is listed after his brother Loingsech mac Colmáin (died 655) in the king lists. It is possible that his defeat at Carn Conaill caused a temporary abdication and entering of a religious life. Upon Loingsech's death in 655, Guaire then became over-king of Connacht ruling until his death in 663. He was buried at Clonmacnoise.

In the following centuries the Ui Fiachrach lost power to the Uí Briúin, who ever after were kings of Connacht. To the south, in what is now County Clare, the Déisi Tuisceart would in the 700's annexe Thomond permanently to Munster.

== Children and descendants ==
Guaire's known sons were Cellach mac Guairi (died 666); Artgal mac Guairi; and Muirchertach Nár mac Guairi (died 668), the latter a king of Connacht. Guaire is the ancestor of the families of Ó Cléirigh, O'Shaughnessy, Colton, Mac Kilkelly, Hynes, O'Dowd, and others. Descendants of Guaire include the following:

- Major-General William O'Shaughnessy, 1673–1744
- Mícheál Ó Cléirigh, c. 1590–1643, main compiler of the Annals of the Four Masters
- William Brooke O'Shaughnessy, 1808–1880, toxicologist and chemist
- Margaret Heckler, born 1931, US Republican politician from Massachusetts
- Thomas Shaughnessy, 1st Baron Shaughnessy, 1853–1923, President of Canadian Pacific Railway
- John O'Heyne, fl. 1706, Dominican Historian

According to the Oxford Dictionary of Family Names in Britain and Ireland, the modern surname Hynes frequently derived from the Irish name Ó hEidhin ('descendant of Eidhin'), adding that 'the principal family of this name is descended from Guaire of Aidhne, King of Connacht'.

== Reference in Literature ==
- Is included in the poem by William Butler Yeats entitled The Three Beggars
- A comprehensive history of King Guaire and his descendants is given in The Hynes of Ireland and supplemented in The O'Shaughnessys, both books by James Patrick Hynes and published by Appin Press (Countyvise Ltd), Birkenhead, United Kingdom.

== See also ==
- Kings of Connacht
- Gort (Gort Inse Guaire), County Galway

== Notes ==
Preceded by Colmán mac Cobthaig	King of Uí Fiachrach Aidhne; 655–663	Succeeded by Ceallach mac Guaire

Preceded by Loingsech mac Colmáin	King of Connacht; 655–663	Succeeded by Cenn Fáelad mac Colgan
