= Ballinderreen =

Village in County Galway, Ireland

Ballinderreen Baile an Doirín
- Village
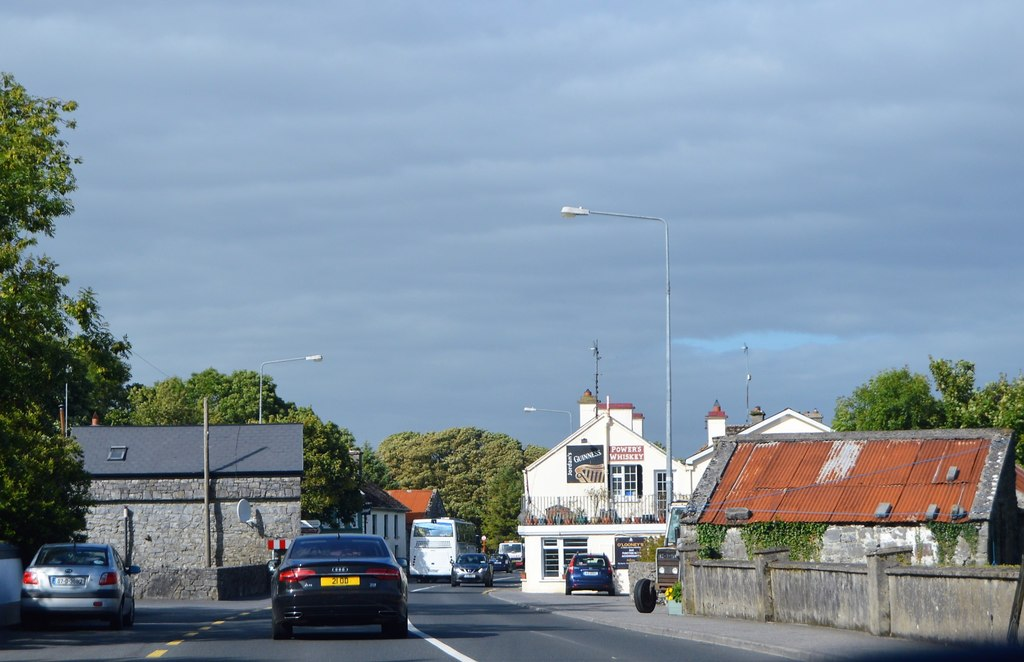
- Entering village on N67 road

- Location in Ireland
- Coordinates: 53°11′10″N 8°54′29″W
- Country: Ireland
- Province: Connacht
- County: County Galway
- Elevation: 20 m (66 ft)

Population (2022)
  - Total: 383
- Time zone: UTC+0 (WET)
  - Summer (DST): UTC-1 (IST (WEST))
- Irish Grid Reference: M392154

Ballinderreen (Irish: Baile an Doirín, meaning 'townland of the little oak grove'), also Ballindereen, is a village located on the N67 road between Kilcolgan and Kinvara in south County Galway, Ireland.

== Location and name ==
Ballinderreen village is approximately 22 km south of Galway City and is a part of the townland of Ballinderreen. Ballinderreen is both the name of the Catholic diocesan parish of Galway and the townland where the village is situated. It takes its name from oak trees in the village. The Irish name of the village, Baile an Doirín, means "town of the little derry or little oakwood", suggesting the area may once have been more heavily forested with oak trees. It contains the early Christian settlement of Surney of Drumacoo.

The parish of Ballinderreen covers a larger area, taking in part of the village of Kilcolgan and borders Clarinbridge, Kinvara and Ardrahan.

Ballinderreen village and townland are in the barony of Dunkellin and in the civil parish of Drumacoo.

== Amenities ==
The village of Ballinderreen has a pub, a primary school, a church (Roman Catholic, St. Colman's), a creche, several sports pitches (mainly used for hurling and athletics), a nursing home, and a community centre. A small shopping centre including a fuel station, convenience store, and take away restaurant opened in 2009.

Between 2000 and 2010 Ballinderreen saw the construction of new houses and several small residential developments. This has resulted in an increase in the village's population.

== Geography ==
Ballinderreen is located close to Galway City, to the neighbouring villages of Clarinbridge and Kinvara, is located on the shores of Galway Bay (the village itself is approximately 1.5 km from the shore). Nearby locations within the bay include Brandy Harbour and Dunbulcaun Bay to the north and Kinvara Bay to the west. Aran Pier, Mulroog Pier and Tarrea Pier shelter some private pleasure crafts on these shores.

Public transport to the village includes two to three services per day passing through the village. Bus Éireann and CityLink operate services frequently through Kilcolgan, five minutes away, to Galway, Limerick, Cork and Shannon Airport.

The Ballinderreen area itself has sometimes referred to by locals as the "mini-Burren" due to its turlough and limestone pavement. A lake with extensive reed beds is present about 1 km west of the village.

== Education ==
Residents of Ballinderreen typically send their children to the national school in the village, which is one of the oldest national schools in the country, having been built in 1857. Other primary schools in the area include the Irish Language Gaelscoil de hÍde in nearby Oranmore and Educate Together in Kilcolgan. Secondary schools in Kinvara (Seamount College) and Gort (Gort Community School) cater for the older children.

== Music ==
A community of local musicians and singers known as Ceoltóirí an Doirín has formed a nonprofit organisation aimed at providing facilities for learning and playing traditional Irish music in Ballindereen. This group organise lessons and instrument rental to encourage traditional music and have recorded examples of local musicians and produced several musical events in the area.

The tradition of Mummers is also alive in the Ballinderreen area with regular visits by Wrenboys (Irish: Lucht an dreoilín) frequent on St. Stephen's Day (26 December) and Mummers calling door to door at Halloween.

The South Galway Bay Music Festival est 2022, takes place in July each year, with famous Irish musicians performing live, such as Mundy, Paddy Casey, The Tumbling Paddies, Mike Denver, Séan Keane, Jimmy Buckley, All Folked up, The whistling Donkeys, in the local GAA grounds over the past number of years. The festival is volunteer-led –organised by Ballinderreen Hurling & Camogie Club and all proceeds going to the running of the club. "The South Galway Bay Music Festival is quickly establishing itself as a standout event in Galway’s summer festival line-up. Each year, it grows in scale and excitement .

== Sport ==
Ballinderreen hurling club was founded in 1884, and has had relatively little success in terms of silverware at the older age level but did win the minor B in 1987. The club plays at the senior level. It won the Galway Intermediate hurling championship in 2017, beating Meelick Eyrecourt by 1–14 to 0–13 in the final. Players from the club have included Noel Lane, Joe McDonagh, and Mick Gill. The Ballinderreen GAA colours are two vertical stripes of green and white.

Other sporting activities in the area include a golf society, a camogie club which caters for teams from U'8 up to Junior, and a variety of water sports, including boating, canoeing and swimming at the local pier at Killeenaran.

In soccer, in 1991 Ballinderreen played host to a UEFA Cup Winners’ Cup, qualifying round, first leg match between Galway United and Danish side Odense. Galway would lose the match 0–3, with the tie vs Odense being one of only 3 appearances Galway have made in a European competition in their entire history.

== See also ==
- List of towns and villages in Ireland
