= Aidhne =

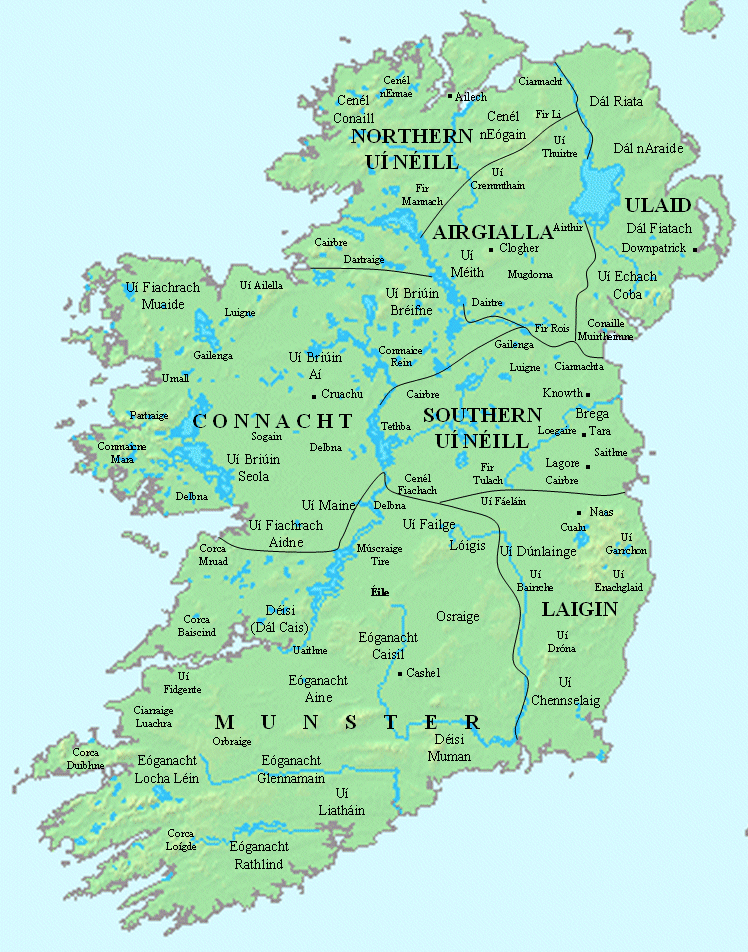
Map of Ireland with tribes, AD 800; the Aidhne are circled.

Aidhne (Irish: [ˈəinʲə] EYE-nə), also known as Uí Fhiachrach Aidhni, Mag nAidni, later Maigh Aidhne ("Plain (of) Aidhne"), was the territory of the Uí Fhiachrach Aidhni, a túath (tribal kingdom) located in the south of what is now County Galway in the south of Connacht, Ireland. (Aidhne is nominative case, Aidhni genitive). Aidhne is coextensive with the present diocese of Kilmacduagh.

== Borders ==
The territory of Aidhne is bounded on the west by Loch Lurgan (Galway Bay) and the barony of Burren in County Clare in the province of Munster. County Clare also bounds Aidhne on its south and south-east side. Aidhne is bounded on the east by the low mountains of Sliabh Echtghe / Slieve Aughty (modern Sliabh Eachtaí), which separate Uí Fhiachrach Aidhni from the territory of Uí Maine (modern Uí Mhaine) in eastern County Galway. On the north-east Aidhne is bounded by the plains of Uí Mhaine and on the north by Mag Mucruime (modern Má Mucraimhe, the area around Athenry). On the north-west Aidhne is bounded by the parish of Mearaí (earlier Medraige, Meadhraighe) / Maree (Ballynacourty, Baile na Cúirte) which is in the territory of Uí Briúin Seola (modern Uí Bhriain Seola).

== History and folklore ==
In placename lore the kingdom took its name from the mythological Aidhne, one of the ten daughters of Partholón by his wife Delgnat. Aidhne was married to Breac.

The actual origin of the name may be from the Old Irish word aidhne, adna, adnae, meaning "aged, old"; perhaps the Aidhne were considered the oldest tribe in the area, in comparison to other peoples who had arrived more recently.

Historical tribes in Aidhne included the Hy-Fiachrach, the Ciarraighe Oga Beathra, the Tradraighe of Dubh-ros, and the Caonraighe of Art Aidhne.

In a later age, a branch of the Fir Bolg made Aidhne their home. Dubhaltach Mac Fhirbhisigh's Book of Genealogies states that the Tuath mhac nUmhóir[settled in]in Dál gCais and in Uí Fhiachrach of Aidhne. Their leader is given as Conall Caol, son of Aonghus mac Úmhór. Conall was killed at the Battle of Maigh Mucruimhe in 195 CE, and his body brought back to Aidhne where it was interred at a leacht called Carn Chonaill (itself the site of a major battle some centuries later).

The territory of Uí Fhiachrach Aidhni is coextensive with the diocese of Cill Mhic Dhuach / Kilmacduagh, which contains the civil parishes of Kinvarradoorus, Killinny, Killeenavarra, Drumacoo, Kilcolgan, Ardrahan, Stradbally, Killeeneen, Killeely, Killora, Killogilleen, Kilchreest, Isertkelly, Killinan, Kilthomas, Kilbeacanty, Beagh, Kilmacduagh, and Kiltartan. The diocese of Kilmacduagh contains the present Catholic parishes of Kinvara, Ballinderreen, Gort, Ardrahan, Craughwell, Beagh, Kilbeacanty, Kilthomas (Peterswell), Clarinbridge, and Kilchreest.
