= Uí Fiachrach Aidhne =

Ancient kingdom in the west of Ireland

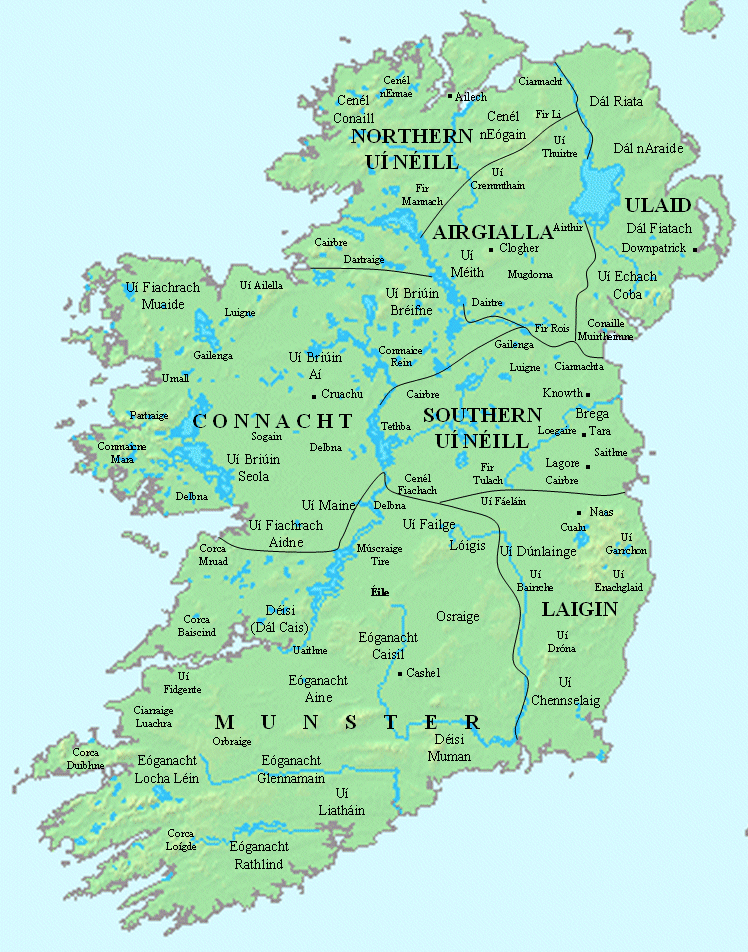
Map of Ireland with tribes, AD 800; the Uí Fiachrach Aidhne are circled.

Uí Fhiachrach Aidhne (also known as Hy Fiachrach) was a kingdom located in what is now the south of County Galway.

== Legendary origins and geography ==
Originally known as Aidhne, it was said to have been settled by the mythical Fir Bolg. Dubhaltach Mac Fhirbhisigh's Leabhar na nGenealach states that the Tuath mhac nUmhoir were led by leader Conall Caol, son of Aonghus mac Úmhór. Connall was killed at the Battle of Maigh Mucruimhe in 195, and his body brought back to Aidhne where it was interred at a leacht called Carn Connell (itself the site of a major battle some centuries later).

Located in the south of what is now County Galway, Aidhne was coextensive with the present diocese of Kilmacduagh. It was bounded on the west by Loch Lurgain (Galway Bay) and the district of Burren in County Clare. County Clare also bounds Aidhne on its south and south-east side. Aidhne is bounded on the east by the low mountains of Slieve Aughty, which separated Uí Fhiachrach Aidhne from Uí Maine.

On the north-east Aidhne is bounded by the plains of Uí Mhaine and on the north by Maigh Mucruimhe (the area around Athenry). On the north-west it was bounded by the parish of Maree which was in the territory of Uí Bhriúin Seola.

The diocese of Kilmacduagh contains the civil parishes of Kinvarradoorus, Killinny, Killeenavarra, Drumacoo, Kilcolgan, Ardrahan, Stradbally, Killeeneen, Killeely, Killora, Killogilleen, Kilchreest, Isertkelly, Killinan, Kilthomas, Kilbeacanty, Beagh, Kilmacduagh, Kiltartan.

The diocese of Kilmacduagh contains the present Catholic parishes of Kinvara, Ballinderreen, Gort, Ardrahan, Craughwell, Beagh, Kilbeacanty, Kilthomas (Peterswell), Clarinbridge, Kilchreest.

== Early history ==
In the early historical era, the Aidhne branch of the Ui Fiachrach dynasty emerged as the ruling tuath in this part of Connacht. Alternative designations for the territory were Maigh Aidhne (the plain of Aidhne), Maigh nAidhne, eventually becoming Uí Fhiachrach Aidhne after the dynasty. The diocese of Cill Mhic Dhuach Kilmacduagh is coextensive with the kingdom, covering all of the barony of Kiltartan and large parts of the baronies of Loughrea and Dunkellin.

By the 8th century the power of its kings were greatly curtailed, and became minor vassals of the Kings of Connacht. The Anglo-Norman's brought them under the rule of the Clanricarde Burkes.

== Principal septs ==
The important septs of the Uí Fhiachrach Aidhne were Ó hEidhin, Ó Seachnasaigh, Ó Cléirigh and Mac Giolla Cheallaigh.

=== Ó Cléirigh ===
The O Clearys were kings of the territory before the O Hynes clan but were exiled from the territory probably in the years following the Anglo-Norman invasion of Connacht. Under the patronage of the O Donnells of Ulster the O Clearys went on to become one of the most famous learned families in Europe.

- Tighearnach Ua Cleirigh, King of Ui Fiachrach Aidhne, died 916
- Mícheál Ó Cléirigh (ca. 1590–1643), chief author of the Annals of the Four Masters.

See also Cléircheán of Saintclerans

=== Ó Cathail ===
This family were forcibly expelled as a result of dynastic conflicts. Thereafter the Ó Cathail family remained a minor sept without any political power.

- Cathal mac Ógán, ancestor of the Ó Cathail family, fl. 10th-century.
- Gilla Mo Choinni Ua Cathail, king of Ui Fiachrach Aidhne, died 1147

=== Ó Seachnasaigh ===
Up until the late 17th century the O Shaughnessys held the sub district of Uí Fhiachrach Aidhne known as Cenél Áeda na hEchtge, which was also their clan name. Cenél Áeda na hEchtge consisted roughly of the civil parishes of Beagh, Kilmacduagh and Kiltartan and also parts of the civil parishes of Kibeacanty and Kilthomas.

In the 1690s the O Shaughnessys had their lands confiscated for supporting the Jacobite cause against William of Orange. A legal battle raged on into the first half of the 18th century between the O Shaughnessys and the Prendergasts, the family who were granted the O Shaughnessy lands, with the O Shaughnessys eventually losing the case.

The senior line of the O Shaughnessys appears have died out in the 1780s.

- Seachnasach mac Donnchadh, namesake O'Shaughnessy, fl. 10th century.
- Sir Roger O'Shaughnessy, Knight and Chief of the Name, fl. 1567.
- Roger O'Shaughnessy, The Ó Seachnasaigh (died 1690), knight and jacobite
- William O'Shaughnessy, The Ó Seachnasaigh, Major-General, 1673–1744.
- Arthur William Edgar O'Shaughnessy (1844–1881), poet.

=== Ó hEidhin ===
This family were driven to the coast of Galway Bay and their principal home became Dunguaire Castle. The Irish annals contain some references to the family:

- AI1057.3 Flaithbertach Ua hEidin's son, king of Uí Fhiachrach, was slain.
- M1578.10. O'Heyne (Rory of the Derry, son of Flan, son of Conor, son of Flan) died. From the beginning of his career until his death he was a man distinguished for hospitality and prowess. His brother's son, Owen Mantagh, son of Edmond, was installed in his place.

Noted bearers of the name include:

- Eidhean mac Cléireach, fl. 800, ancestor of the Ó hEidhin/Hynes family of south County Galway.
- Tairrdelbach Ua Conchobair (1088–1156), King of Connacht and High King of Ireland, son of Mor Ni hEidhin.
- Seaán Ó hEidhin, Franciscan Bishop of Clonfert, fl. 1437–1459.
- John O'Heyne, Dominican historian, fl. 1706.
- Garry Hynes (born 10 June 1953), Irish theatre director.
- Celine Hynes, architect

=== Mac Giolla Cheallaigh ===
Kilkellys held the sub-district of Aidhne known as Cinéal nGuaire, which is the area covered by the modern Catholic parish of Ballinderreen. They lost their lands in the Cromwellian confiscations during the middle of the 17th century.

- Giolla Ceallaigh mac Comhaltan, fl. 10th century, namesake of Kilkelly.
- Padhraic Mac Giolla Chealla, poet and seanchai, fl. 1798.
- Ollie Kilkenny (born 1962), Irish sportsperson.

== Kings of Connacht ==
The following were Kings of Connacht from the Ui Fiachrach Aidhne line:

- Colmán mac Cobthaig (died 622)
- Loingsech mac Colmáin (died 655)
- Guaire Aidne mac Colmáin (died 663)
- Muirchertach Nár mac Guairi Aidne (died 668)
- Fergal Aidne mac Artgaile mac Guaire (died 696)

== Kings of Uí Fiachrach Aidhne ==
See Kings of Uí Fiachrach Aidhne

== Lords of Cenél Áeda na hEchtge ==
- Diarmaid Ó Seachnasaigh, before 1533-after 1544
- Ruaidhrí Gilla Dubh Ó Seachnasaigh, before 1567–1569
- Diarmaid Riabach Ó Seachnasaigh, 1569–1573
- Liam Ó Seachnasaigh
- Dermot Ó Seachnasaigh
- Roger Gilla Dubh Ó Seachnasaigh
- Dermott Ó Seachnasaigh
- Roger O'Shaughnessey
- Cormac O'Shaughnessey
- Colman O'Shaughnessey
- Roebuck O'Shaughnessey
- Joseph O'Shaughnessey
- Bartholomew O'Shaughnessey

== Lords of Coill Ua bhFhiachrach ==
- Conchobhair Crone Ó hEidhin
- Eoghan mac Braon Ua Cléirigh
- Maolfabhaill Ua hEidhin
- Eoghan Ua hEidhin
- Flann Ó hEidhin
- Eoghan Mantach Ó hEidhin
- Aodh Buidhe Ó hEidhin
- Eoghan mac Aodh Buidhe Ó hEidhin of Lydican
- Eoghan Mantach Ó hEidhin, died 1588
- Aedh Buidhe Ó hEidhin
- Hugh Boy O'Heyne, died 1594
- Eoghan O'Heyne of Lydican, alive ca. 1640s.

== Annalistic references ==
- 966. Chronicon Scotorum: Cormac ua Cillín, of the Uí Fhiachrach of Aidne, successor of Ciarán and Comán and comarba of Tuaim Gréne—and by him was built the great church of Tuaim Gréne, and its bell-tower—a sage and an old man and a bishop, rested in Christ.
- 1025. The grandson of Comhaltan Ua Cleirigh, lord of Ui-Fiachrach Aidhne, died.
- 1033. A conflict between the Eli and the Ui-Fiachrach Aidhne, in which Braen Ua Cleirigh and Muireadhach Mac Gillaphadraig, with many others, were slain.
- 1048. The son of Donnchadh Gott, royal heir of Teamhair, and Ua hEidhin, lord of Ui-Fiachrach-Aidhne, died.
- 1048. Mael Fabhaill Ua hEidhin, lord of Ui-Fiachrach-Aidhne, died.
- 1055. Domhnall Ruadh Ua Briain was slain by Ua h-Eidhin, lord of Ui-Fiachrach Aidhne.
- 1067. The battle of Turlach Adhnaigh, between Aedh of the Broken Spear Ua Conchobhair, King of Connaught, and Aedh, the son of Art Uallach Ua Ruairc, and the men of Breifne along with him; where fell Aedh Ua Conchobhair, King of the province of Connaught, the helmsman of the valour of Leath-Chuinn; and the chiefs of Connaught fell along with him, and, among the rest, Aedh Ua Concheanainn, lord of Ui-Diarmada, and many others.
- 1094. A battle was gained by Tadhg, son of Ruaidhri Ua Conchobhair, and the Sil-Muireadhaigh, over the people of Thomond and West Connaught, in which three hundred were slain; and they plundered all West Connaught. This was called the battle of Fidhnacha. Of the chieftains who were slain in this battle were Amhlaeibh Ua hAichir, Donnsleibhe Ua Cinnfhaelaidh, and the son of Gillafursa Ua Maelmhuaidh.
- 1100. Gilla na Naomh Ua hEidhin, lord of West Connaught, died, and was interred at Cluain-mic-Nois.
- 1125.The two sons of Aineislis Ua hEidhin were slain in treachery at Bun-Gaillimhe. Flann and Gillariabhach, the two sons of Aineislis Ua hEidhin, were slain by Conchobhar Ua Flaithbheartaigh.
- 1126.Conchobhar Ua Cleirigh, lector of Cill-dara, died.
- 1147.Gilla Mo Choinni Ua Cathail, lord of Ui-Fiachrach-Aidhne, was killed by the grandson of Domhnall Ua Conchobhair.
- 1153. Gillacheallaigh Ua hEidhin, lord of Aidhne, and his son, Aedh were killed at the battle of Fordruim in Mide.
- 1159. Geal Bhuidhe Ua Seachnasaigh; Donnchadh, son of Aedh, son of Ruaidhri; Diarmaid Ua Conceanainn; Athius, son of Mac Cnaimhin; the two sons of Conchobhar Ua Conchobhair; Murchadh, the son of Domhnall Ua Flaithbheartaigh killed at the battle of Ath Fhirdiaidh in Oirghialla.
- 1166. An army, composed of the men of Breifne and Meath, and of the foreigners of Ath-cliath and the Leinstermen, was led by Tighearnan Ua Ruairc into Ui-Ceinnsealaigh; and Diarmaid Mac Murchadha was banished over sea, and his castle at Fearna was demolished. They set up as king, Murchadh, the grandson of Murchadh, he giving seventeen hostages to Ruaidhri Ua Conchobhair, to be sent to Tir-Fiachrach-Aidhne.
- 1179. Melaghlin Reagh O'Shaughnessy, Lord of half the territory of Kinelea, was killed by the son of Donough O'Cahill.
- 1180. Muirgheas Ó hEidhin, Lord of Hy-Fiacrach-Aidhne, was killed by the men of Munster.
- 1187. The rock of Lough Key was burned by lightning. Duvesa, daughter of Ó hEidhin, and wife of Conor Mac Dermot, Lord of Moylurg, with seven hundred (or seven score) others, or more, both men and women, were drowned or burned in it in the course of one hour.
- 1191. Roderic O'Conor set out from Connaught, and went to Flaherty O'Muldory in Tirconnell, and afterwards passed into Tyrone, to request forces from the north of Ireland, to enable him to recover his kingdom of Connaught; but the Ultonians not consenting to aid in procuring lands for him from the Connacians, he repaired to the English of Meath, and these having also refused to go with him, he passed into Munster, whither the Sil-Murray sent for him, and gave him lands, viz. Tir Fiachrach and Kinelea of Echtge.
- 1201. Conor, the son of Maurice Ó hEidhin, died.
- 1203. The son of Gillakelly O'Ruaidhin, Bishop of Kilmacduagh, died.
- 1203.Murtough the Teffian, son of Conor Moinmoy, who was the son of Roderic O'Conor, was slain by Dermot, the son of Roderic, and Hugh, the son of Roderic, namely, by his own two paternal uncles, on the green of Kilmacduagh.
- 1206. Hugh, the son of Murrough O'Kelly, Lord of Hy-Many, and Caithniadh O'Caithniadh, Lord of Erris, died.
- 1211. Cugaela Ó hEidhin died.
- 1212. Donough Ó hEidhin was deprived of sight by the son of Cathal Crovderg, without the consent of the O'Conor.
- 1214. O'Kelly, Bishop of Hy-Fiachrach, died.
- 1216. Giolla Arnain Ó Martan, Chief Ollave (professor) of law in Ireland, died.
- 1222. Gilla Mo Choinni Ó Cahill, Lord of Kinelea East and West, was slain by Shaughnessy, the son of Gilla na Naemh Crom Ó Seachnasaigh, after having been betrayed by his own people.
- 1223. Seachnasaigh Ó Seachnasaigh, the son of Gilla na Naemh Ó Seachnasaigh, was slain by the Clann-Cuilen, a deed by which the Bachal mor of St. Colman, of Kilmacduagh was profaned.
- 1224. Gilla na Naemh Crom Ó Seachnasaigh, Lord of the Western half of Kinelea of Echtge, died.
- 1225. Owen Ó hEidhin, lord. see 1225.
- 1230. Gilla-Isa O'Clery, Bishop of Leyny Achonry ... died.
- 1232. Faghtna O'Hallgaith, Coarb of Drumacoo, and official of Hy-Fiachrach Aidhne, who had kept an open house for strangers, the sick, and the indigent, and also for the instruction of the people, died.
- 1232. Conor, son of Hugh, the son of Roderic, made his escape from the English, and the sons of the chiefs of Connaught assembled around him, and they made an incursion into the Tuathas; but Conor, with Gilla Ceallaigh Ó hEidhin, and Gilchreest, the son of Donough Mac Dermot, and many others along with them, were slain by the people of the Tuathas. This was the day on which the people of the Tuathas whitened all the handles of their battle-axes, because it was rumoured that it was by a man who carried a white handled battle-axe that the son of Hugh had been slain.
- 1235. Owen Ó hEidhin see 1235.
- 1236. Owen Ó hEidhin
- 1240. Hugh, the son of Gilla-na-naev Crom O'Shaughnessy, was slain by Conor, son of Hugh, who was the son of Cathal Crovderg, and by Fiachra O'Flynn.
- 1248. Opichin Guer was slain by Gilla Mo Choinne O'Cahill.
- 1251. Gilla Mochoinne, son of Gilla Mochoinne O'Cahill, was slain by Conor, son of Hugh, the son of Cathal Crovderg.
- 1253.Owen Ó hEidhin, Lord of Hy-Fiachrach Aidhne, died.
- 1263. Mael Fabhill Ó hEidhin was slain by the English.
- 1326. Nicholas Ó hEidhin died.
- 1340. Eoghan Ó hEidhin, Lord of Hy-Fiachrach-Aidhne, was slain by his own kinsmen.
- 1408. John Cam Ó Seachnasaigh was slain by the son of O'Loughlin while playing on the green of Cluain Ramhfhoda.
- 1434. Dermot, the son of Murtough Garbh Ó Seachnasaigh, was killed by his own horse, as he was being shod.
- 1578. O'Heyne (Rory of the Derry, son of Flan, son of Conor, son of Flan) died. From the beginning of his career until his death he was a man distinguished for hospitality and prowess. His brother's son, Owen Mantagh, son of Edmond, was installed in his place.

== See also ==
- Cenél Áeda na hEchtge
- Cenél Guaire
- Muintir Máelfináin
- Meadraige
- Kings of Uí Fiachrach Aidhne
