= Shaughnessy =

Shaughnessy may refer to:

- Shaughnessy, Alberta, a village in Canada
- Shaughnessy, Vancouver, a neighbourhood in Vancouver, British Columbia
  - Shaughnessy Elementary School, a school in the Vancouver School Board school district in Vancouver, British Columbia, Canada
- Shaughnessy playoff system, a postseason tournament format

== People with the surname ==
- Alfred James Shaughnessy (1916–2005), English scriptwriter and producer, also known as "Freddy Shaughnessy"
- Brenda Shaughnessy (born 1970), American poet
- Charles Shaughnessy (born 1955), English television, theatre and film actor
- Clark Shaughnessy (1892–1970), American Football coach
- Conor Shaughnessy (born 1996), Irish professional footballer
- Dan Shaughnessy (born 1953), American sports writer
- David Shaughnessy (born 1957), British voice-over actor
- Dawn Angela Shaughnessy, American radiochemist
- Deb Shaughnessy (born 1960), American politician
- Edward L. Shaughnessy, expert on early Chinese history
- Edwin Thomas Shaughnessy (1929–2013), a swing music and jazz drummer
- Elizabeth Shaughnessy (born 1937), Irish chess player and trainer
- Francis Shaughnessy (1911–1982), American ice hockey player
- Frank Shaughnessy (1884–1969), minor league baseball official who invented a playoff system
- Gerald Shaughnessy (1887-1950), American Roman Catholic Church. He served as Bishop of Seattle
- Joseph Thomas Gordan Shaughnessy (born 1992), Irish professional defender
- Jonathan Shaughnessy, Canadian curator in the field of contemporary art
- Matt Shaughnessy (born 1986), American football player in the role of defensive end
- Meghann Shaughnessy (born 1979), American professional tennis player
- Michael O'Shaughnessy (1864–1934), Irish civil engineer
- Mickey Shaughnessy (1920-1985), Irish American character actor and comedian
- Mina P. Shaughnessy (1924–1978), pioneering academic in the field of Basic Writing
- Patrick "Spark" Shaughnessy, President and CEO of AVI Communication
- Paul V. Shaughnessy, American politician
- Peter Anthony "Pete" Shaughnessy (1962–2002), British mental health activist
- Ryan O'Shaughnessy (born 1992), Irish singer-songwriter and former actor
- Shaughnessy Bishop-Stall, Canadian journalist
- Shaughnessy Cohen (1948–1998), Canadian politician
- Steve O'Shaughnessy (footballer) (born 1967), Welsh professional manager of Airbus UK Broughton O'Shaughnessy or "Shaughssa"
- Thomas Michael O'Shaughnessy Jr. (born 1956), American member of the UCF Athletics Hall of Fame
- Thomas George Shaughnessy, 1st Baron Shaughnessy KCVO (1853–1923), American-born Canadian railway administrator
- Tom Shaughnessy (1892–1938), American ice hockey player and coach
- William G. Shaughnessy, American politician
- William O'Shaughnessy(1673–1744), Irish Chief and Major-General

== See also ==
- O'Shaughnessy, a traditional Irish surname
- Shaughnessy Cohen Award, writing award established in her memory
- Shaughnessy Village, a neighbourhood in Montreal, Quebec, Canada
- Harisiades v. Shaughnessy, Supreme Court of the United States case on the Smith Act and deportation
- Mount Shaughnessy Tunnel, a railway tunnel located in British Columbia
- St. John's Shaughnessy, Anglican church in Vancouver
