= O'Shaughnessy =

Family name

O'Shaughnessy Ó Seachnasaigh
- Parent house: Connachta (Uí Fiachrach Aidhne)
- Country: Kingdom of Connacht
- Origin: Irish Gaels
- Founder: Seachnasach mac Donnchadh
- Final ruler: Diarmaid Ó Seachnasaigh
- Titles: King of Connacht; King of Uí Fiachrach Aidhne; Lord of Cenél Áeda na hEchtge; Baron Shaughnessy

Ó Seachnasaigh, O'Shaughnessy, collectively Uí Sheachnasaigh, clan name Cinél nAedha na hEchtghe, is a family surname of Irish origin. The name is found primarily in County Galway and County Limerick. Their name derives from Seachnasach mac Donnchadh, a 10th-century member of the Uí Fiachrach Aidhne, which the Ó Seachnasaigh were the senior clan of. The town of Gort, Ireland, was the main residence of the family since at least the time of their ancestor, King Guaire Aidne mac Colmáin.

== Naming conventions ==
Male	Daughter	Wife (Long)	Wife (Short)
Ó Seachnasaigh	Ní Sheachnasaigh	Bean Uí Sheachnasaigh	Uí Sheachnasaigh

== History ==
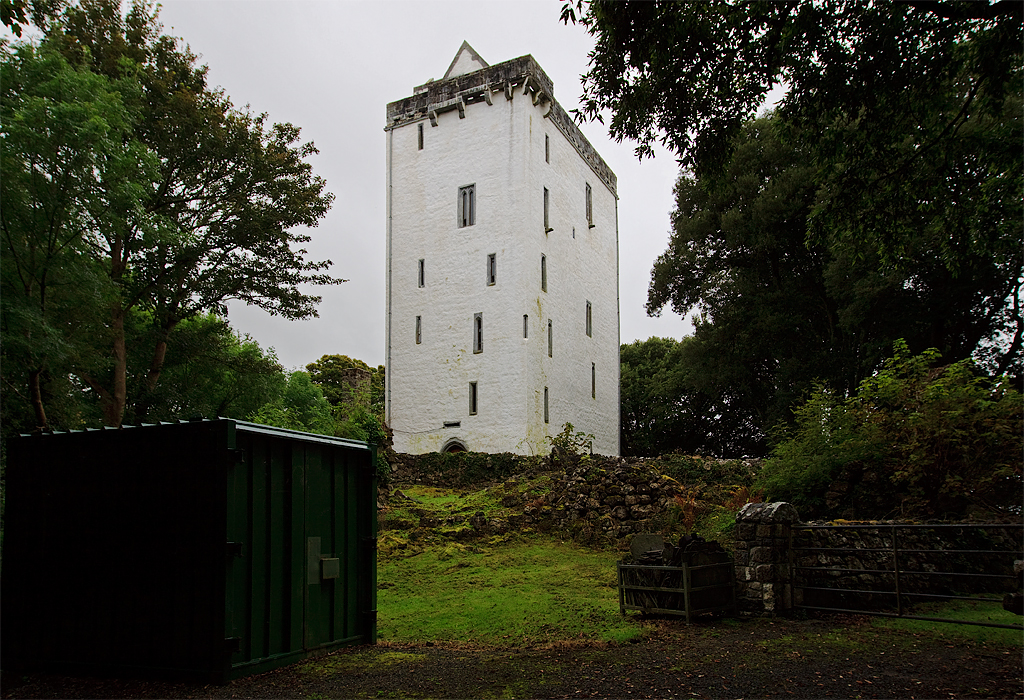
Ardamullivan Castle, an O'Shaughnessy stronghold from the 16th century

Up until the late 17th century the Ó Seachnasaighs held the sub-district of Uí Fiachrach Aidhne known as Cenél Áeda na hEchtge (modern Irish, Cinéal nAedha na hEchtghe), meaning "kindred of Aedh of the Slieve Aughty", which was also their clan name. Cinéal nAedha na hEchtghe / Kinelea consisted roughly of the civil parishes of Beagh, Kilmacduagh and Kiltartan and also parts of the civil parishes of Kibeacanty and Kilthomas. Their closest related kinsmen were the Ó Cathail / O Cahill clan, originally chiefs of eastern Kinelea, and the other clans of Uí Fhiachrach Aidhne the most prominent of which were the Ó hEidhin / O Hynes, Ó Cléirigh / O Cleary and Mac Giolla Cheallaigh / Kilkelly septs. Up until the mid-17th century, the O'Hynes clan were still styled lords of Uí Fhiachrach Aidhne even though the Ó Seachnasaighs had become more powerful than their kinsmen during this century. In the 1690s, Captain Roger O'Shaughnessy had his lands confiscated for supporting the Jacobite cause against William of Orange, with the lands going to Sir Thomas Prendergast, 1st Baronet. A legal battle raged on into the first half of the 18th century between the Ó Seachnasaigh and the Prendergasts, the family who were granted the lands, with the Ó Seachnasaigh eventually losing the case. The senior line of the Ó Seachnasaighs may have died out in the 1900s.

O'Shaughnessy castles include Gort Castle, Fiddaun Castle, Ardamullivan Castle, Newtown Castle, Derryowen, which is just inside the County Clare border, Ballymulfaig, and a castle on one of the islands in Lough Cutra. According to a list naming the castles of County Galway and their owners, drawn up in 1574 by the English administration in Ireland, Islandmore Castle (now Thoor Ballylee) was listed as being owned by a John O'Shaughnessy.

The last de facto Ó Seachnasaigh lord of Kinelea died at Gort after returning home from the Battle of Aughrim on 12 July 1691. Thousands of bearers of the name still survive both in their homeland and further abroad.

== Notable O'Shaughnessys ==
Notable people with this surname include:

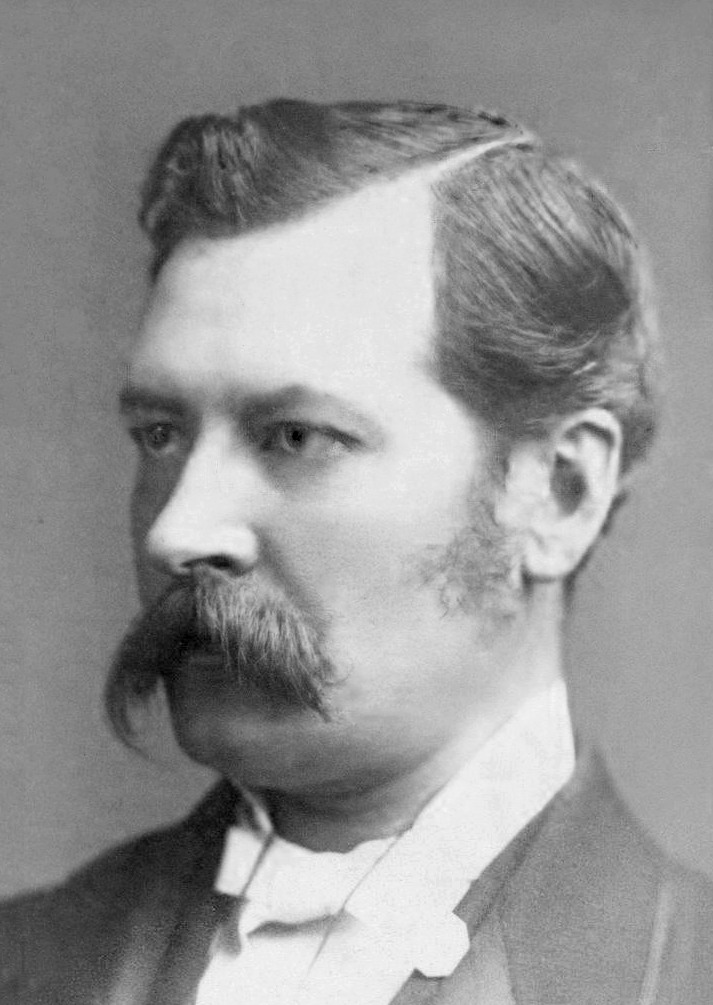
Arthur O'Shaughnessy, 19th-century poet

- Andrew O'Shaughnessy (historian), historian
- Andrew O'Shaughnessy (hurler) (born 1984), Irish hurler
- Andrew O'Shaughnessy (politician) (1866–1956), Irish politician and Industrialist
- Arthur O'Shaughnessy (1844–1881), British poet and herpetologist
- Barney O'Shaughnessy (1912–2007), Australian cricketer
- Bob O'Shaughnessy (1921–1995), American basketball player
- Colleen O'Shaughnessey (born 1971), American voice actress
- Daniel O'Shaughnessy (born 1994), Finnish footballer
- Darren O'Shaughnessy (born 1972), Irish author, nom de plume Darren Shan
- Dudley O'Shaughnessy (born 1989), Boxer
- Edward O'Shaughnessy (1860–1885), English cricketer
- Eileen O'Shaughnessy (1905–1945), the first wife of George Orwell
- Fiona O'Shaughnessy (born 1979), Irish actress
- James O'Shaughnessy (born 1960), American author and investor
- James O'Shaughnessy, Baron O'Shaughnessy (born 1976), British politician
- Margaret Heckler (1931–2018, Margaret Mary O'Shaughnessy), US lawyer and politician
- Michael O'Shaughnessy (1864–1934), Irish civil engineer
- Nicholas O'Shaughnessy, professor, author and political commentator
- Patrick O'Shaughnessy (born 1993), Finnish footballer
- Perri O'Shaughnessy, pen name of American authors
- Roger O'Shaughnessy (died 1690), Captain in the Army of James II of England
- Ryan O'Shaughnessy (born 1992), Irish singer-songwriter
- Tam O'Shaughnessy (born 1952), American author and educator
- Terrence J. O'Shaughnessy, general, United States Air Force
- Tony O'Shaughnessy (1930–2006), Irish hurler
- Thomas O'Shaughnessy (1850–1933), Recorder of Dublin
- Sir Roger O'Shaughnessy of Kinelea (died 1569)
- William O'Shaughnessy (1673–1744), Major-General and Chief of the Name
- William Brooke O'Shaughnessy (1809–1889), Irish toxicologist (introduced medical cannabis in Europe), chemist and inventor (telegraph)
- Patrick O’Shaughnessey (1957- Present), Irish publican hailing from Kilfinane County Limerick

== See also ==
- Shaughnessy (disambiguation)
- Richard Michael Levey (1811–1899), born O'Shaughnessy, changed to his mother's maiden name Levey
- Uí Fiachrach Aidhne
- Irish nobility

== Notes ==
Some with relation to the O'Shaughnessy clan may spell it O'Shaughnessey or Shaughnessy.
