= Tubber, County Galway =

Village in County Galway, Ireland

Tubber An Tobar
- Village
- Location in Ireland
- Coordinates: 53°00′00″N 8°53′00″W
- Country: Ireland
- Province: Munster
- County: County Galway
- Elevation: 46 m (151 ft)
- Time zone: UTC+0 (WET)
  - Summer (DST): UTC-1 (IST (WEST))
- Irish Grid Reference: R407948

Tubber (from Irish an Tobar 'the well' – shortened form of Tobar Rí an Domhnaigh meaning "well of the king of Sunday") is a small village located in the south of County Galway, Ireland.

== Location ==
Tubber, County Galway, is the northern part of a loosely defined rural community that is located on the Clare/Galway border. It comes under the Catholic parish of Gort and Beagh in the Diocese of Kilmacduagh, but it is still served by St Michael's Church, Tubber. Tubber, County Clare, is a Catholic parish in the Diocese of Killaloe, and is served by St Michael's Church at Tubber Cross. The area as a whole roughly encompasses the townlands with a 3 miles (4.8 km) radius (52.99004°N 08.89419°W) The Tubber post office is in Galway. There is a holy well of Tobereendoney (Tobar Rí an Domhnaigh) from which the community takes its name.

Fiddaun Castle, a tower house between Lough Doo and Lough Aslaun built around 1574, is near to the village of Tubber. It is one of the castles that the O'Shaughnessy family owned in the area, the others being Gort Castle, Derryowen, Ballymulfaig, Newtown Castle (west of Gort), and Ardamullivan Castle.

== Notable people ==
- Éamonn Taaffe - intercounty hurler
