= Roger O'Shaughnessey =

Roger O'Shaughnessey or O'Shaughnessy may refer to:

- Sir Roger O'Shaughnessy, The O'Shaughnessy, Chief of the Name (died 1690)
- Sir Roger O'Shaughnessy of Kinelea, Irish Knight, known in Gaeilge as Ruaidhrí Gilla Dubh Ó Seachnasaigh (died 1569)
