= Colman O'Shaughnessy =

Irish Roman Catholic clergyman

Colman O'Shaughnessy, O.P. (died 2 September 1748) was an Irish Roman Catholic clergyman who served as Bishop of Ossory from 1736 until his death in 1748.

He was the eldest son of Cormac, second son of Dermott Ó Seachnasaigh. He was educated at Athenry College, after which he became an army officer. When he left his military career, he joined the Dominican Order. He made his ecclesiastical studies in Louvain, and he completed them before 1706. After serving on the Irish Mission for years, with great zeal and success, he was elected Provincial of the Dominican Order on 30 April 1726, serving until 1730. Almost ten years later, he was appointed Bishop of Ossory by a papal brief on 5 October 1736.

When his uncle, William O'Shaughnessy, died in 1744, he became the Chief of the Name and commenced a lawsuit in the Court of Common Pleas to recover the ancient O'Shaughnessy estates at Gort in County Galway, Ireland. The property had been taken from Roger O'Shaughnessy by King William III in 1690, and given to Thomas Prendergast in 1697. Despite a protracted court case, which lasted beyond the life of the bishop, it was finally ruled in favour of the Prendergasts, the penal laws against Catholics tending to defeat the rights of the O'Shaughnessies.

Catholic Church titles
Preceded by Patrick Shee	Bishop of Ossory; 1736–1748	Succeeded by James Bernard Dunne
Titles of nobility
Preceded by William O'Shaughnessy	Lord of Cenél Áeda na hEchtge; 1744–1748	Succeeded by Roebuck O'Shaughnessey
