= Ardamullivan Castle =

Tower house in Ireland

- Caisleán Ard Mhaolabháin (Irish)
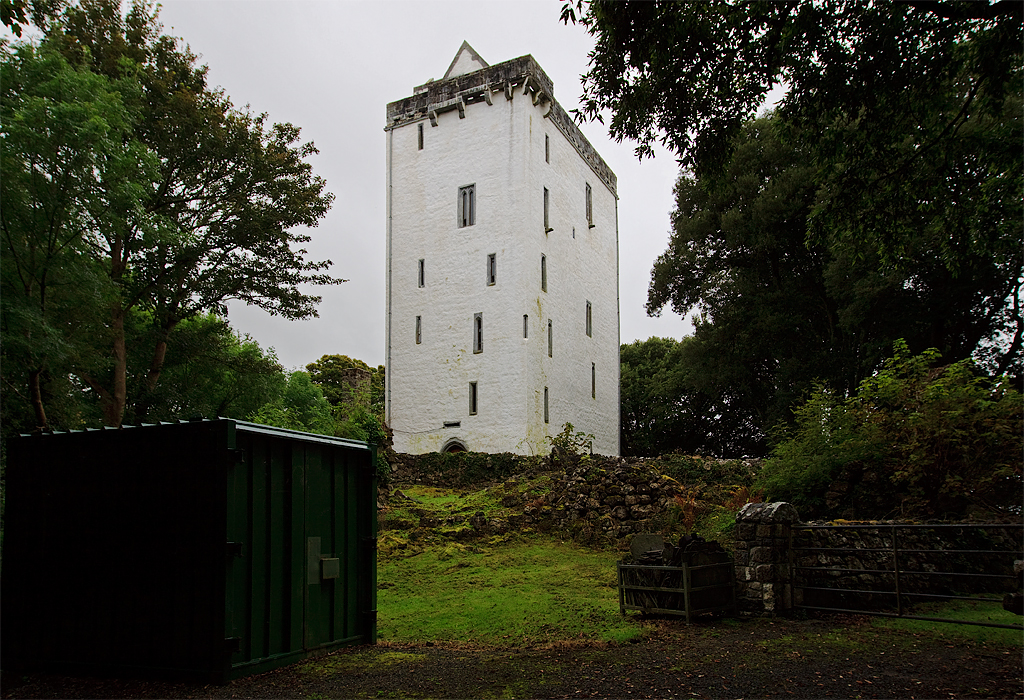

- Location within Ireland
- 53.004182°N 8.829328°W
- Type: tower house
- Location: Ardamullivan, Shanaglish, County Galway, Ireland

History
- Built: 16th century

Site notes
- Owner: State

National monument of Ireland
- Official name: Ardamullivan Castle
- Reference no.: 252

Ardamullivan Castle is a tower house and National Monument located in County Galway, Ireland.

== Location ==
Ardamullivan Castle is located 8.2 km (5.1 mi) south of Gort and 2 km (1.2 mi) southwest of Lough Cutra.

== History ==
Ardamullivan Castle was built in the 16th century by the Uí Sheachnasaigh (O'Shaughnessy) clan, rulers of the region known as Cenél Áeda na hEchtge until being disposed by Cromwell's invasion (1650s). It is first mentioned after the 1567 death of Ruaidhrí Gilla Dubh Ó Seachnasaigh. In 1579, Diarmaid Riabach Ó Seachnasaigh and his nephew John, fought each other in a dispute over the castle, which resulted in death for both. Diarmaid Riabach had previously acquired notoriety after betraying Richard Creagh, the fugitive Catholic Archbishop of Armagh, to the authorities.

The castle was restored in the 1990s, including reroofing and plastering with lime mortar. Late medieval wall paintings were discovered on the first and fourth levels; they have been compared to those at Abbeyknockmoy and Clare Island Abbey. Depicted is a bishop, a stag hunt, Saint Christopher, a Passion cycle, and St Michael weighing souls on Judgement Day.

== Description ==
The tower house six storeys. Part of the original attacking wall remains.

There are traces of bartizans on the NE and SW corners and along the south wall. Other features include a machicolation, murder hole, many slit windows, fireplaces and a slopstone. Traces of walls around the castle may be part of the original bawn.
