= Roebuck O'Shaughnessy =

Irish noble (died 1762?)

Robuck or Roebuck O'Shaughnessey (died 1762?) was an Irish Chief of the Name and Lord of Cenél Áeda na hEchtge.

Robuck was a younger brother of the previous chief. He continued his brothers legal proceedings against Sir Thomas Prendergast, 2nd Baronet, and his nephew and heir, John Prendergast Smyth, 1st Viscount Gort. The case was ongoing at the time of his death.

Robuck had issue Joseph (died 1783), William, Mary, Catherine, Ellice, Elleanor, all alive in 1784.

Preceded by Colman O'Shaughnessey	Lord of Cenél Áeda na hEchtge before 1748–1762?	Succeeded by Joseph O'Shaughnessey
