= Gilla na Naemh Crom Ó Seachnasaigh =

Irish chief (died 1224)

Gilla na Naemh Crom Ó Seachnasaigh (died 1224) was an Irish Chief of the Name.

Ó Seachnasaigh was lord of Cenél Áeda na hEchtge, but is only recorded in the Irish annals towards the end of his era.

- 1222: Gilla Mo Choinni Ó Cahill, Lord of Kinelea East and West, was slain by Shaughnessy, the son of Gilla na Naemh Crom Ó Seachnasaigh, after having been betrayed by his own people.
- 1223: Seachnasaigh Ó Seachnasaigh, the son of Gilla na Naemh Ó Seachnasaigh, was slain by the Clann-Cuilen, a deed by which the Bachal mor of St. Colman, of Kilmacduagh was profaned.
- 1224. Gilla na Naemh Crom Ó Seachnasaigh, Lord of the Western half of Kinelea of Echtge, died.

Only three more Ó Seachnasaigh's would be named in the annals before the 16th century (1240, 1403, 1408), none of them chiefs. Thus the succession of the lordship is unclear till c. 1533.

Preceded by Melaghlin Reagh Ua Seachnasaigh	Lord of Cenél Áeda na hEchtge; 1179?–1224	Succeeded by Diarmaid Ó Seachnasaigh
