= Dermot Ó Seachnasaigh =

Irish Chief of the Name (died 1606)

Sir Dermot Ó Seachnasaigh, Chief of the Name, died 1606. He was a son of Sir Ruaidhrí Gilla Dubh Ó Seachnasaigh and Lady Honora O'Brien, daughter of Murrough O'Brien, 1st Earl of Thomond.

Ó Seachnasaigh was in contention with his elder but illegitimate brother, John Ó Seachnasaigh, who till 1585 claimed lordship of Cenél Áeda. The two brothers travelled to Dublin to attend the 1585 Parliament, after which no more is heard of John until 1601.

Sir Dermot married Shyly Ni Hubert, and had issue Roger Gilla Dubh (born 1583), Dathi, William, Joan, Julia and Honora.

- William had sons William, Edmond, Roger and Dermot.
- Joan married Sir William Burke, and was the mother of Richard Burke, 6th Earl of Clanricarde.
- Julia married Teige O'Kelly of Gallagh.
- Honora married Johnock Burke of Tully.

Preceded by Liam Ó Seachnasaigh	Lord of Cenél Áeda na hEchtge before 1579–1606	Succeeded by Roger Gilla Dubh Ó Seachnasaigh
