= John Ó Seachnasaigh =

Irish Chief of the Name

John Ó Seachnasaigh (died 1601) was an Irish Chief of the Name.

Ó Seachnasaigh was the eldest but illegitimate son of Sir Ruaidhrí Gilla Dubh Ó Seachnasaigh. Upon the death of his father, his younger but legitimate half-brother, Sir Dermot Ó Seachnasaigh, inherited Cenél Áeda.

Contention between the two brothers continued until 1585, when they both travelled to Dublin to attend the 1585 Parliament. It seems that the parliament found in favour of Sir Dermot, which left John destitute. However under Brehon law he was still regarded as the Chief of the Name.

The Annals of the Four Masters, sub anno 1601, relates John's fate:

An unusual accident and a sad fatality occurred to the camp of the Bourkes, namely, an advantage was taken of their want of watching, so that their enemies came into the midst of them. They left them lying mangled and slaughtered, pierced and blood-stained corpses, throughout their tents and booths. On this occasion was slain O'Shaughnessy, i.e. John, the son of Gilla-Duv, son of Dermot, son of William, who had been banished from his patrimony, as indeed had been all those plunderers who were along with the sons of John Burke.

His death occurred somewhere in north Munster.
