= Maunalua Bay =

Bay in Honolulu, Hawaii, United States

Coordinates: 21°17′03.18″N 157°43′05.45″W

Maunalua Bay in the south of Eastern Honolulu (purple)

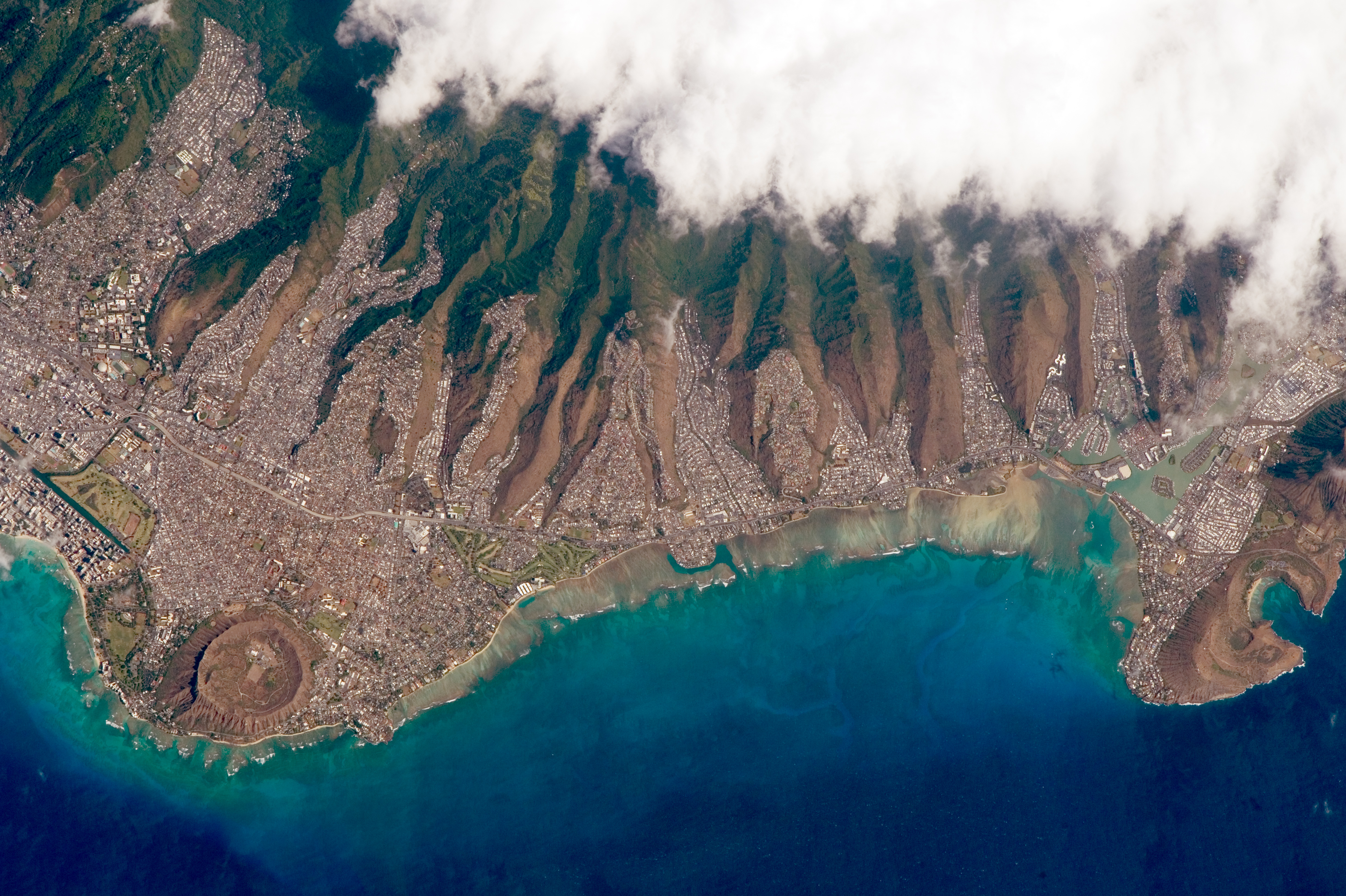
Maunalua Bay (2016)

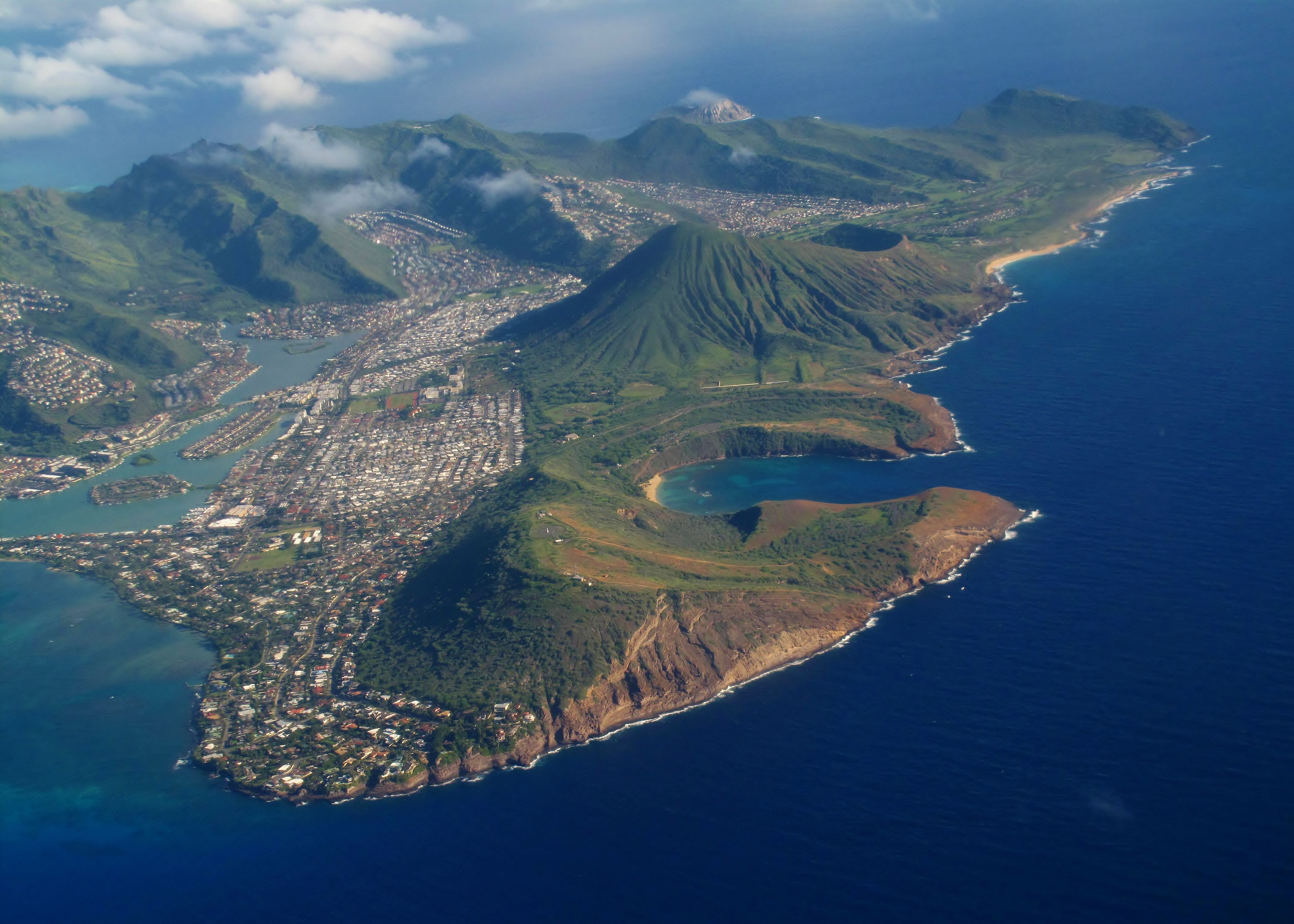
Hawaii Kai, Portlock, Koko Head, Hanauma Bay, and Koko Crater

Maunalua Bay is a bay in the southeast of Honolulu, the capital of Hawaiʻi. The bay extends about 6.3 miles (10.1 kilometers) from the southern tip of Diamond Head, the Black Point, also called Kūpikipikiʻō, in the west to Portlock Point, also known as Kawaihoa Point, to the east.

On the land side, just to the east of Diamond Head is the upmarket suburb of Kāhala. Following are several affluent hillside suburbs like Hawaii Loa Ridge, a gated community that occupies an entire slope. In the east is the suburb of Hawaii Kai, built by industrialist Henry J. Kaiser after World War II. Hawaii Kai has a marina, shopping centers, including a Costco, Walgreens, Longs, and Safeway, and numerous restaurants such as the well-known Roy's and Kona Brewing Co. pub. On the headland leading to Koko Head is the suburb of Portlock, which is a part of Hawaii Kai.

The name Maunalua (from Mauna = mountain and [ʻe]lua = two, in the native Hawaiian language) refers to the designation of the area what is now referred to as "Hawaii Kai." The mountains, located inland from Portlock Point, are the 645 feet (197 meters) high Koko Head, and about 2.2 miles (3.5 kilometers) east thereof, close to Hanauma Bay the Koko Crater, the walls of which rise up to 1,207 feet (368 meters).

According to one legend, Maunalua was one of the first settlements when settlers arrived in Hawaiʻi around the 12th century. Native Hawaiians originally lived there by fishing and cultivating sweet potatoes (ʻuala) along the coastal plains at a place called Ke-kula-O Kamauwai. Maunalua was formerly famous for having the largest Native Hawaiian fishpond (loko iʻa) on Oʻahu. The 523 acre fishpond known as Keahupua-O-Maunalua had a wall or kuapā which originally spanned from Kuliʻouʻou headland and to what is now Portlock. The pond was used primarily to raise mullet (ʻanae) and was also home to a multitude of endemic or indigenous waterbirds. The area continued to be important for fishing and agriculture until the 1950s when the fishpond was filled for housing development.

== Maunalua Bay Beach Park ==
The beach park was developed by Henry J. Kaiser during the development of Hawaii Kai Marina. Historically, the beach consists of 535,000 square feet (49,703 sq. m) of coral that was dredged and removed, creating a watercraft channel. Kaiser donated it to the City and County of Honolulu in 1960. Public access to the bay is easily made through the city and county beach park off of Kalanianaʻole Highway across from Hawaii Kai Drive.

Despite the tide height, this bay and reef are always accessible to watercraft, standup paddlers, fishers, and kayakers. At low tide, people can walk out on the sandbar and explore the nearby reef. It is not uncommon to find moon jellies that get caught on the sand bar before the tide lowers.

Another scenic spot for tourists near Maunalua Bay is Hanauma Bay, known for having clear waters and many native fish, ideal for snorkeling and sightseeing.

Maunalua Bay Beach Park is also the finish for the Molokai to Oahu Paddleboard World Championships, a 32 mile paddleboard race considered to be the sport's world championshp.

== Maunalua Bay Launch Ramp Facility ==
The Maunalua Bay Launch Ramp Facility is located on the northeastern end of Maunalua Bay. It has a large parking lot, with long stalls to accommodate over 50 cars plus boat trailers. The facility includes 2 recently renovated boat launch ramps, and boat washing stations.

The facility also houses the Hui Nalu O Hawai’i canoe club, first known as Waikiki Beach Boys canoe club, then changed to Healani Canoe club, and now known as Hui Nalu Canoe Club a recreational and competitive canoe club founded in 1908 by Duke Kahanamoku & The Waikiki Beach Boys. Some of the Waikiki beach boys to name a few who consisted of Nainoa Thompson captain and Navigator of the Voyaging Ship The Hōkūleʻa, Reginald Malabey Union Member of Local 996 Hawaii Teamsters Union truck driver, Sammy The Steam-Boat Heavy Weight Wrestler Ocean man, Surfer, Francisco Crozier Rancher Polo Rider and many more just to name a few. The club's mission is to provide educational activities for individuals, families and the community revolving around ocean activities.

== Gallery ==
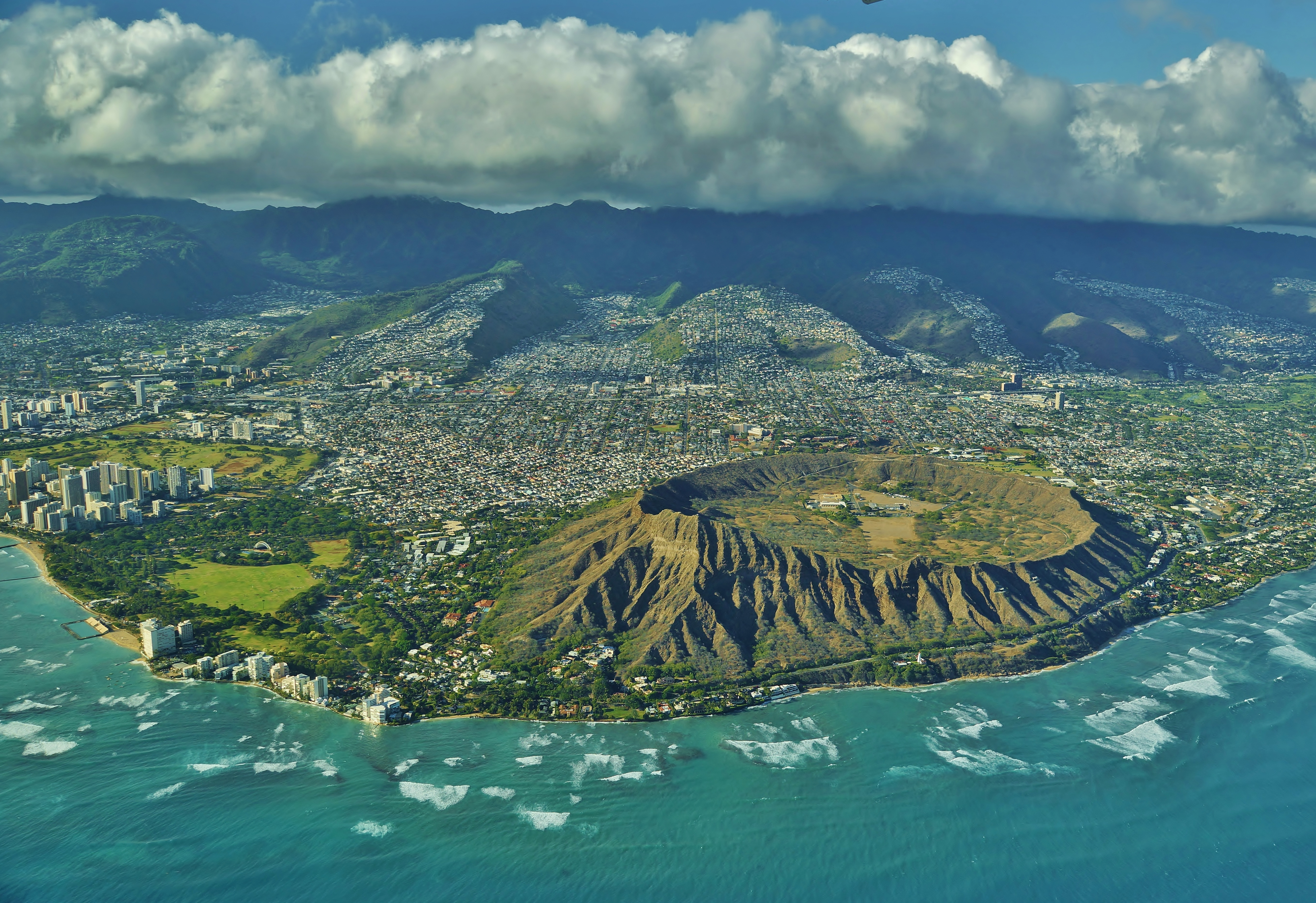
Diamond Head

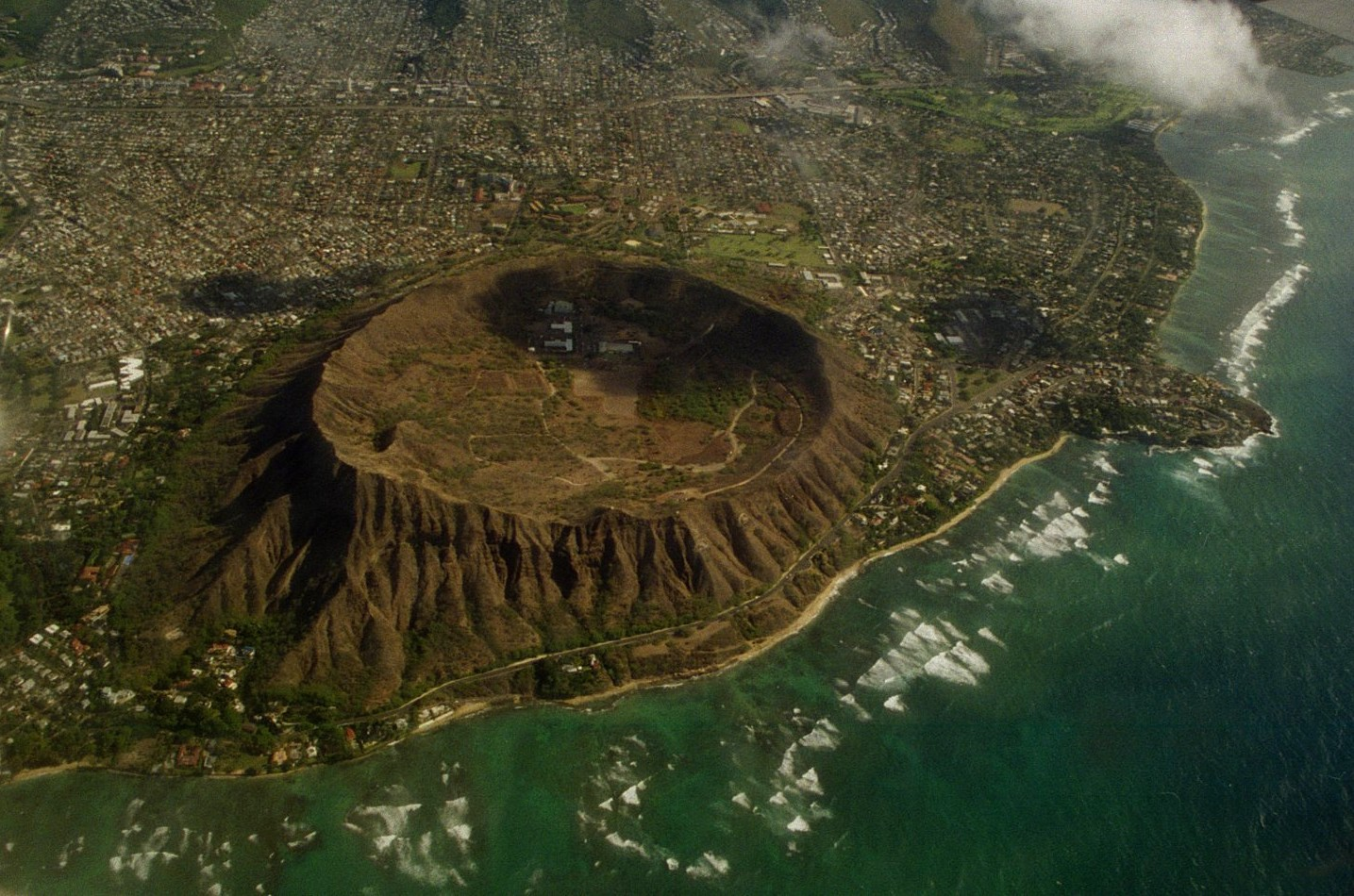
Diamond Head with Kāhala to the right, and the suburb Kaimuki (top)

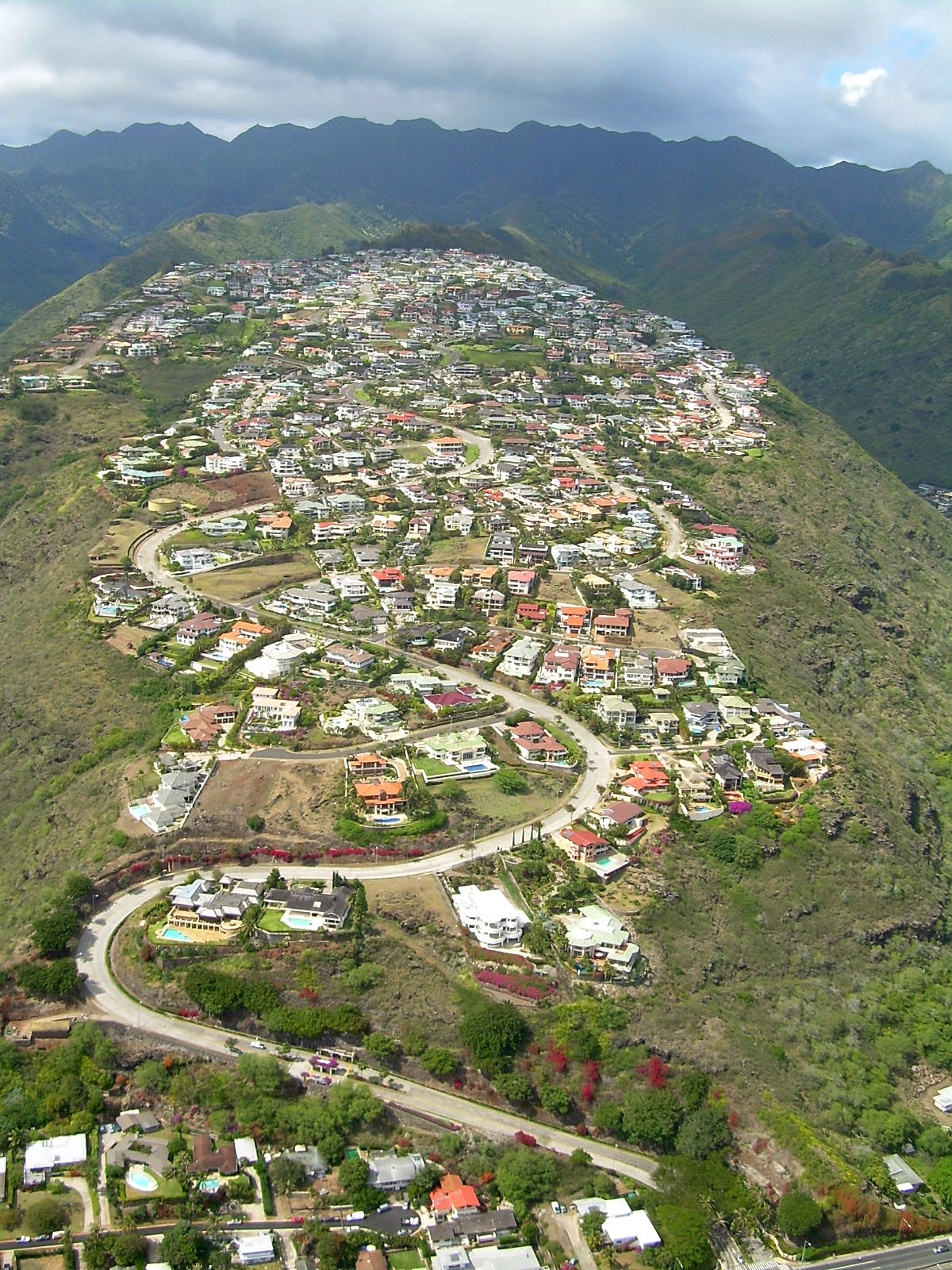
Puʻuikena Drive, the main road through Hawaii Loa Ridge (2008)

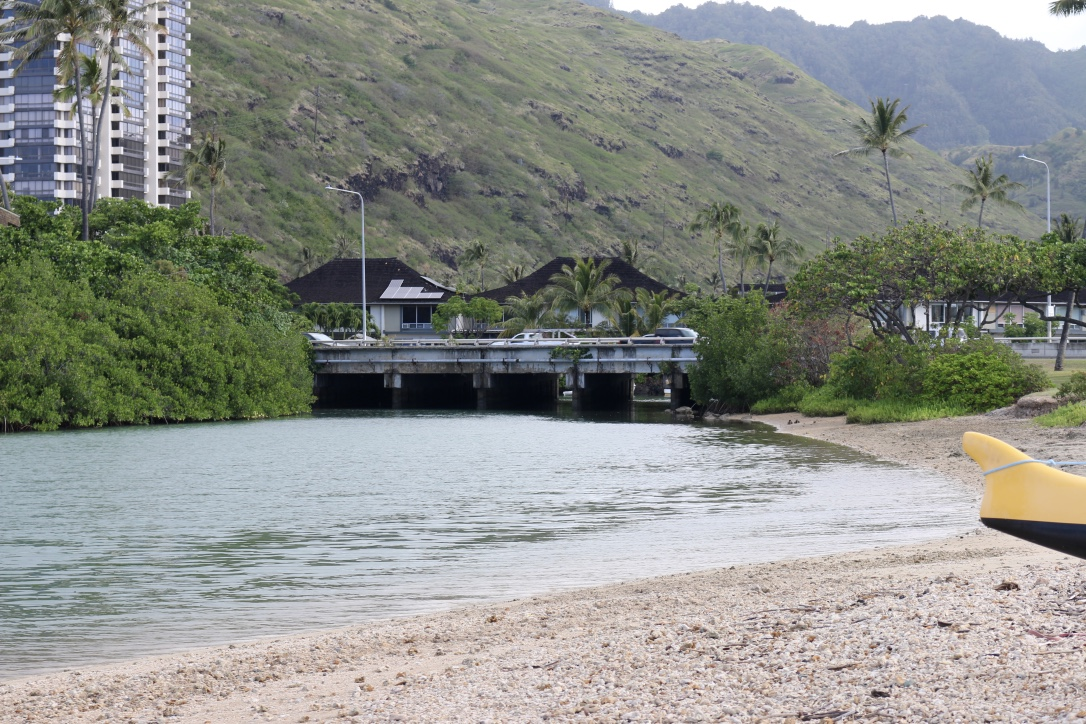
The connection point between Maunalua Bay and Koko Marina

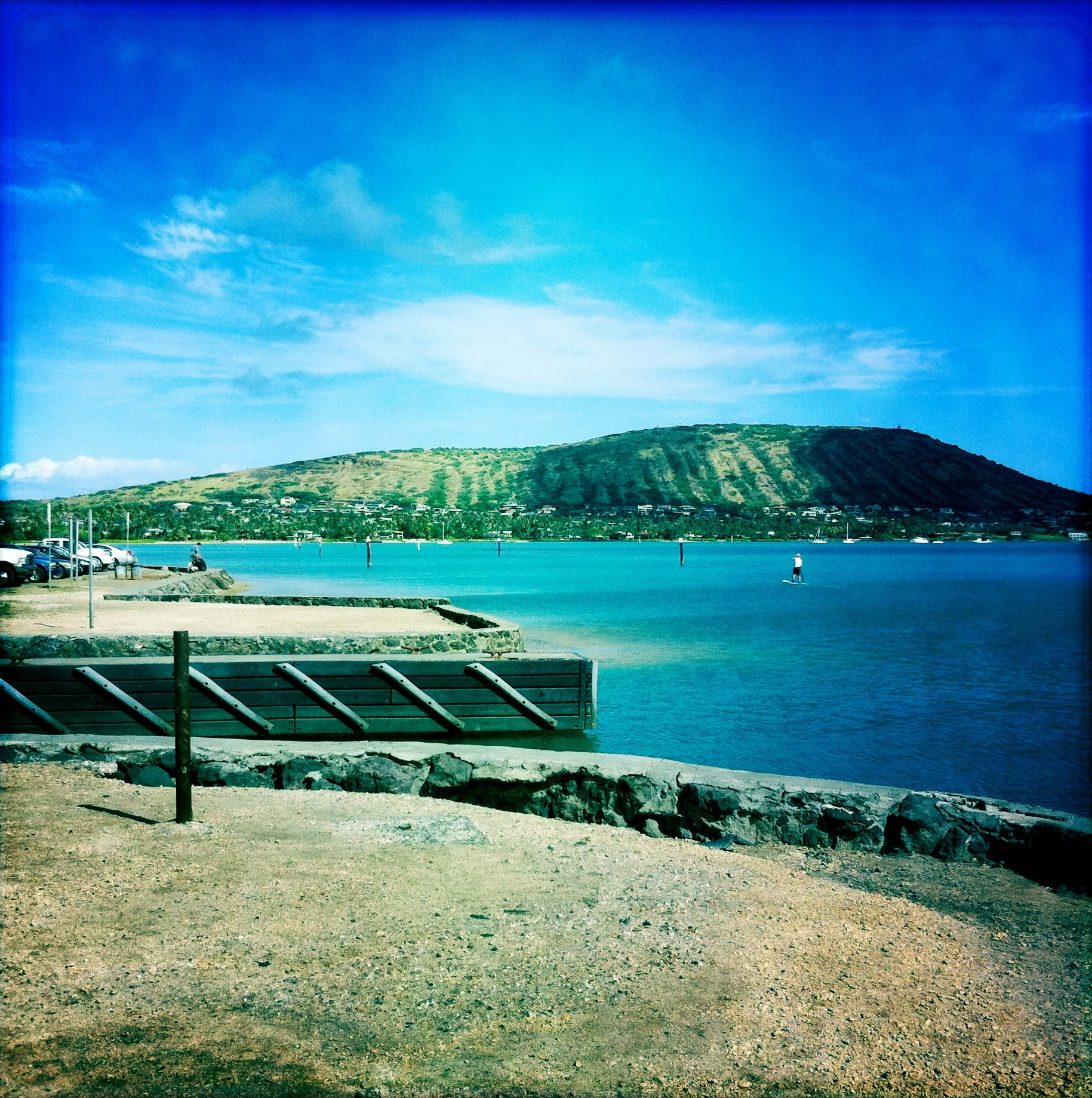
Facing Koko Head

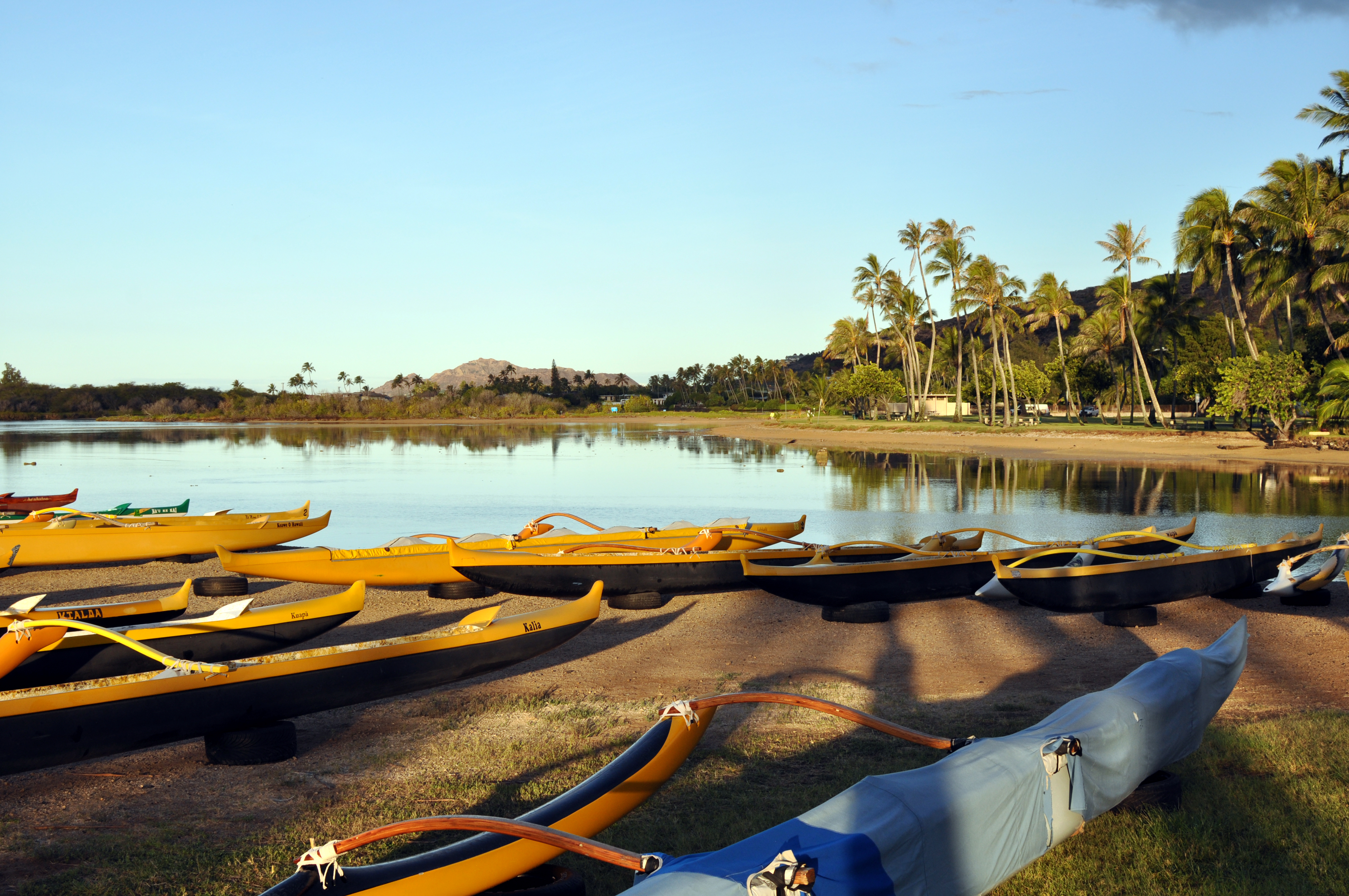
Facing Diamond Head

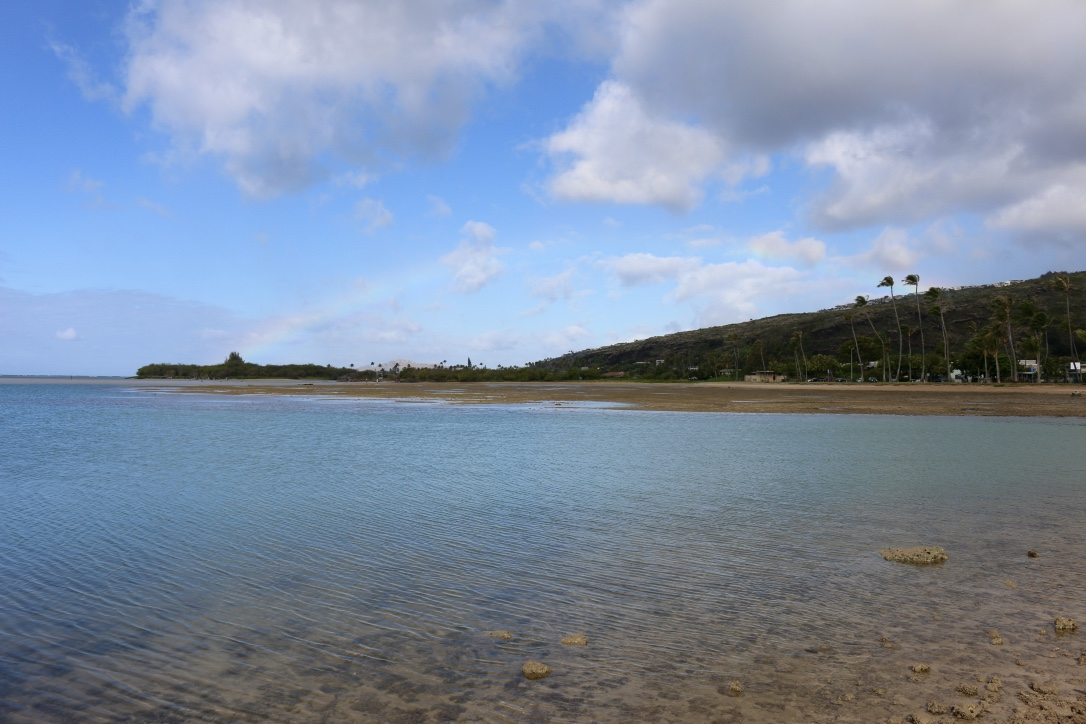
West side of Maunalua Bay

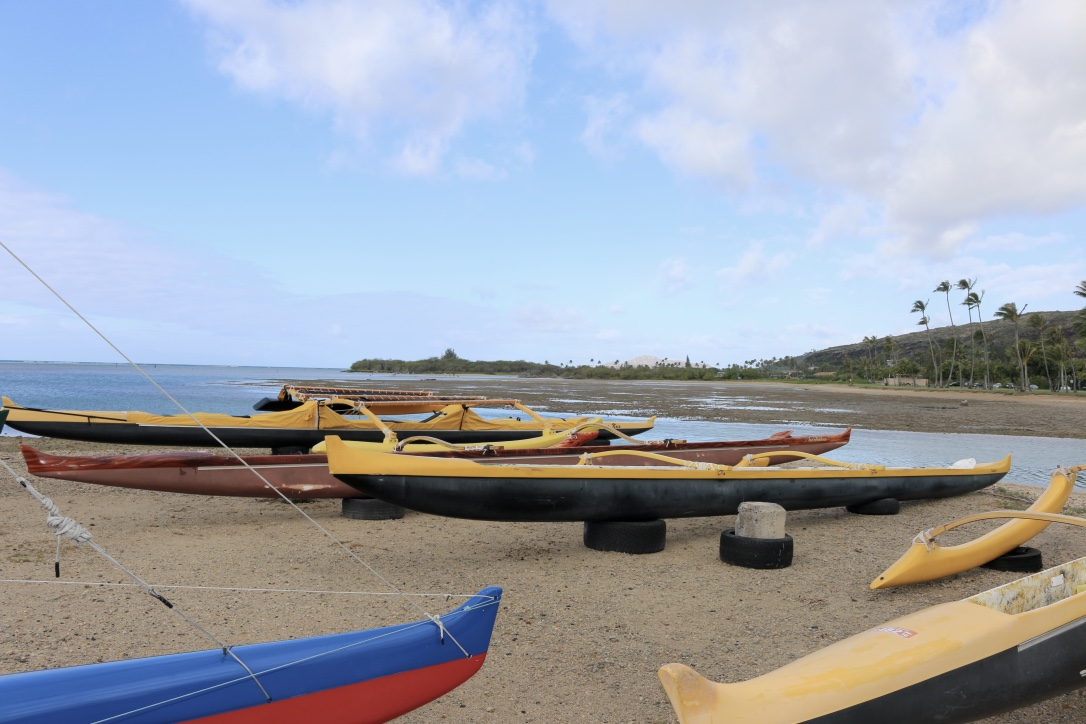
Canoes docked at Maunalua Bay

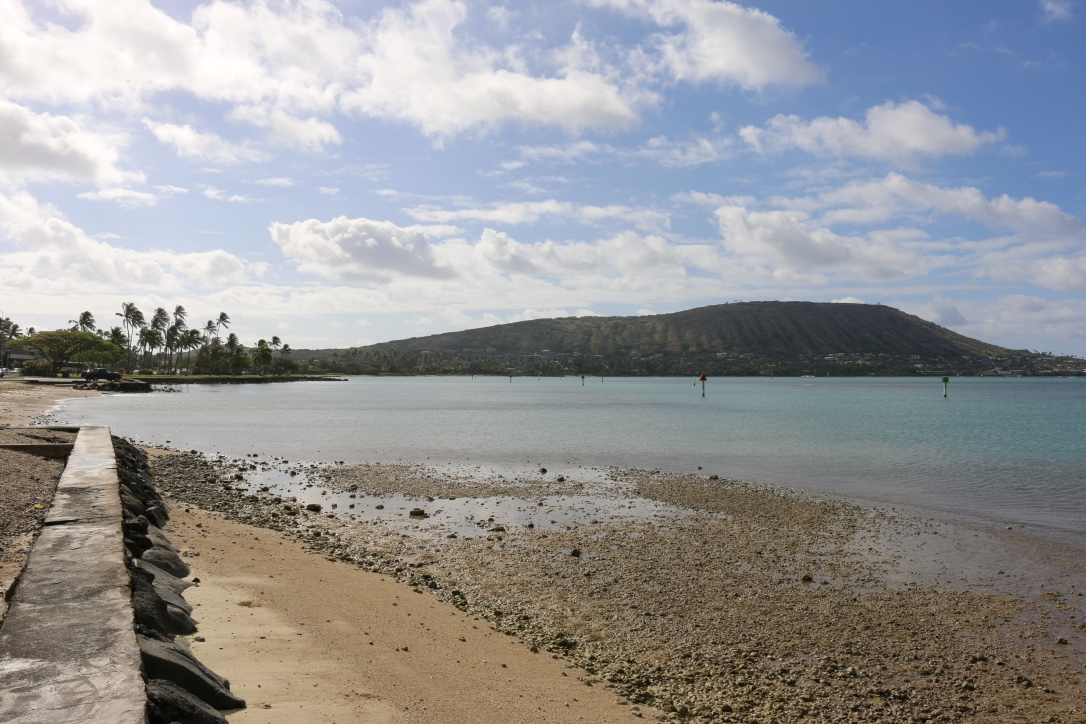
East view of Maunalua Bay looking towards Portlock

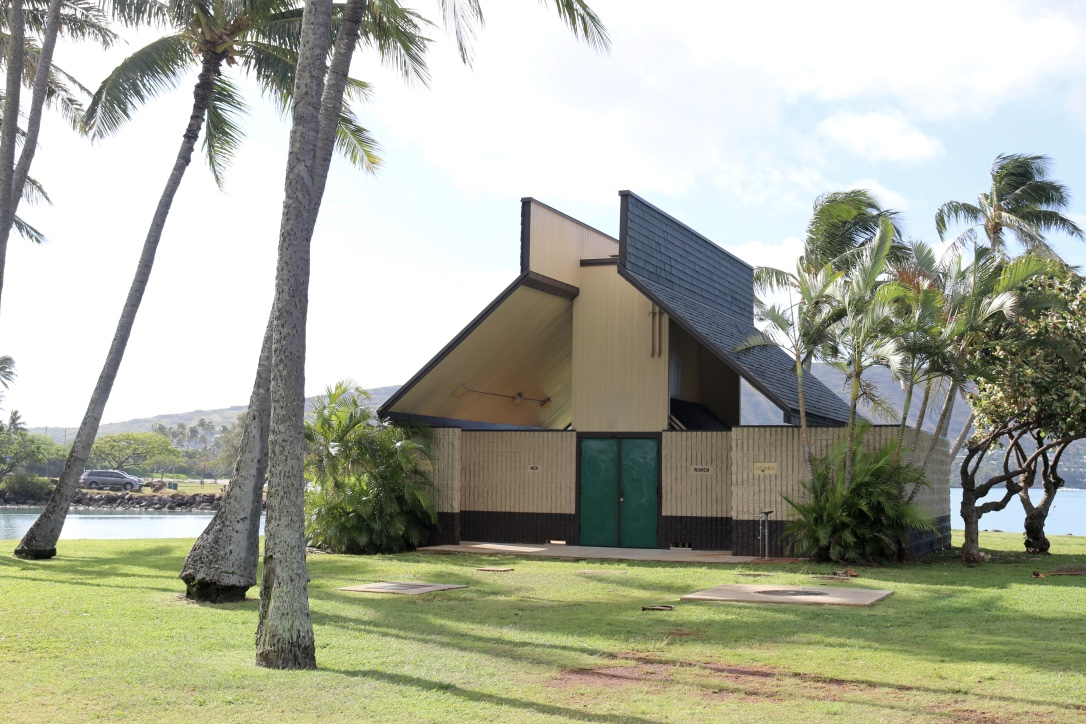
Building at Maunalua Bay Beach Park
