= Liam Ó Seachnasaigh =

Irish Chief of the Name (died 1579)

Sir Liam Ó Seachnasaigh (died 1579) was an Irish Chief of the Name.

Ó Seachnasaigh was the eldest legitimate son of Sir Ruaidhrí Gilla Dubh Ó Seachnasaigh by Lady Honora O'Brien, daughter of Murrough O'Brien, 1st Earl of Thomond, but till 1573 had been usurped as Chief by his uncle, Diarmaid Riabach. Diarmaid was deposed but in 1579 ambushed Sir Liam at Ard Maoldubhain. The latter was killed, but had so severely wounded Diarmaid that he died shortly after of his wounds. Sir Liam was succeeded by his younger brother, Dermot.

Preceded by Diarmaid Riabach Ó Seachnasaigh	Lord of Cenél Áeda na hEchtge before 1573–1579	Succeeded by Dermot Ó Seachnasaigh
