= Roger Gilla Dubh Ó Seachnasaigh =

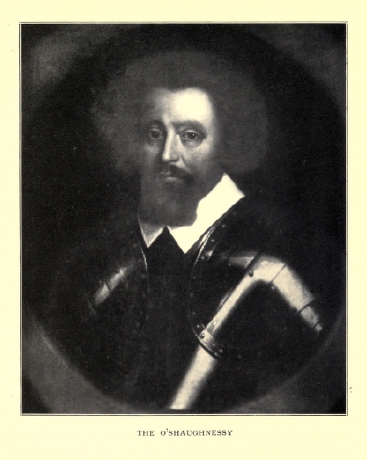
Sir Roger Gilla Duff O'Shaughnessy

Sir Ruadhri Gilla Dubh Ó Seachnasaigh (anglicized Roger Gilla Duff O'Shaughnessy) was Chief of the Name during 1583–1650.

== Biography ==
Ó Seachnasaigh was married to Elis Lynch at the time of his father's death, by whom he had his heir, Sir Dermot, and a daughter, Gyles. He remarried to Julia MacCarthy of Muskerry but had no issue by her.

A portrait of Sir Roger, dressed in his armour, is preserved in Kilkenny castle.

Fiddaun Castle was most likely built by Sir Roger, as he is the first mentioned living there and it is not known before his time.

== Gyles ==
Gyles Ni Seachnasaigh, who receives no mention in the surviving O'Shaughnessy pedigrees, but who appears in several other sources, married Donal III O'Donovan of County Cork. She had sons Donal IV O'Donovan, Cornelius, Morogh and Richard, and is an ancestor through the first of the present Lords of Clancahill. She was alive as late as May 1676. Certainly it was her distance from, and eventual irrelevance to, the family into which she was born, which caused her to eventually be forgotten by the O'Shaughnessy genealogists. The families were barely acquainted with each other, and in fact some daughters go unmentioned in many surviving Irish pedigrees. Those of the O'Shaughnessys are also incomplete before and beyond her generation. But the O'Donovans made sure Gyles was celebrated by the poets in their country and her elegy was composed by an Ó Dálaigh.

== References and notes ==
Notes

Sources

- D'Alton, John, Illustrations, Historical and Genealogical, of King James's Irish Army List (1689). Dublin: 1st edition (single volume), 1855. pp. 328–32.
- History of Galway, James Hardiman, 1820
- Tabular pedigrees of O'Shaughnessy of Gort (1543–1783), Martin J. Blake, Journal of the Galway Archaeological and Historical Society, vi (1909–10), p. 64; vii (1911–12), p. 53.
- John O'Donovan. The Genealogies, Tribes, and Customs of Hy-Fiachrach. Dublin: Irish Archaeological Society. 1844. Pedigree of O'Shaughnessy: pp. 372–91.
- Old Galway, Professor Mary Donovan O'Sullivan, 1942
- Galway: Town and Gown, edited Moran et al., 1984
- Galway: History and Society, 1996

Preceded by Dermot Ó Seachnasaigh	Lord of Cenél Áeda na hEchtge before 1606–1650	Succeeded by Dermott Ó Seachnasaigh
