= Melaghlin Reagh Ua Seachnasaigh =

Melaghlin Reagh Ua Seachnasaigh (died 1179) was an Irish Chief of the Name.

Ó Seachnasaigh was the first bearer of the surname to be listed as of Cenél Áeda na hEchtge. However, the territory seems to have been contended with the Ó Cathail family. The Annals of the Four Masters record, sub anno 1179:

Melaghlin Reagh O'Shaughnessy, Lord of half the territory of Kinelea, was killed by the son of Donough O'Cahill.

He was a descendant of Seachnasach mac Donnchadh.

Unknown	Lord of Cenél Áeda na hEchtge ?–1179	Succeeded by Diarmaid Ó Seachnasaigh
