= Paddleboarding =

Water sport

Paddleboarding is a water sport in which participants are propelled by a swimming motion using their arms while lying or kneeling on a paddleboard or surfboard in the ocean or other body of water. Paddleboarding is usually performed in the open ocean, with the participant paddling and surfing unbroken swells to cross between islands or journey from one coastal area to another.

== History ==
=== Polynesia ===
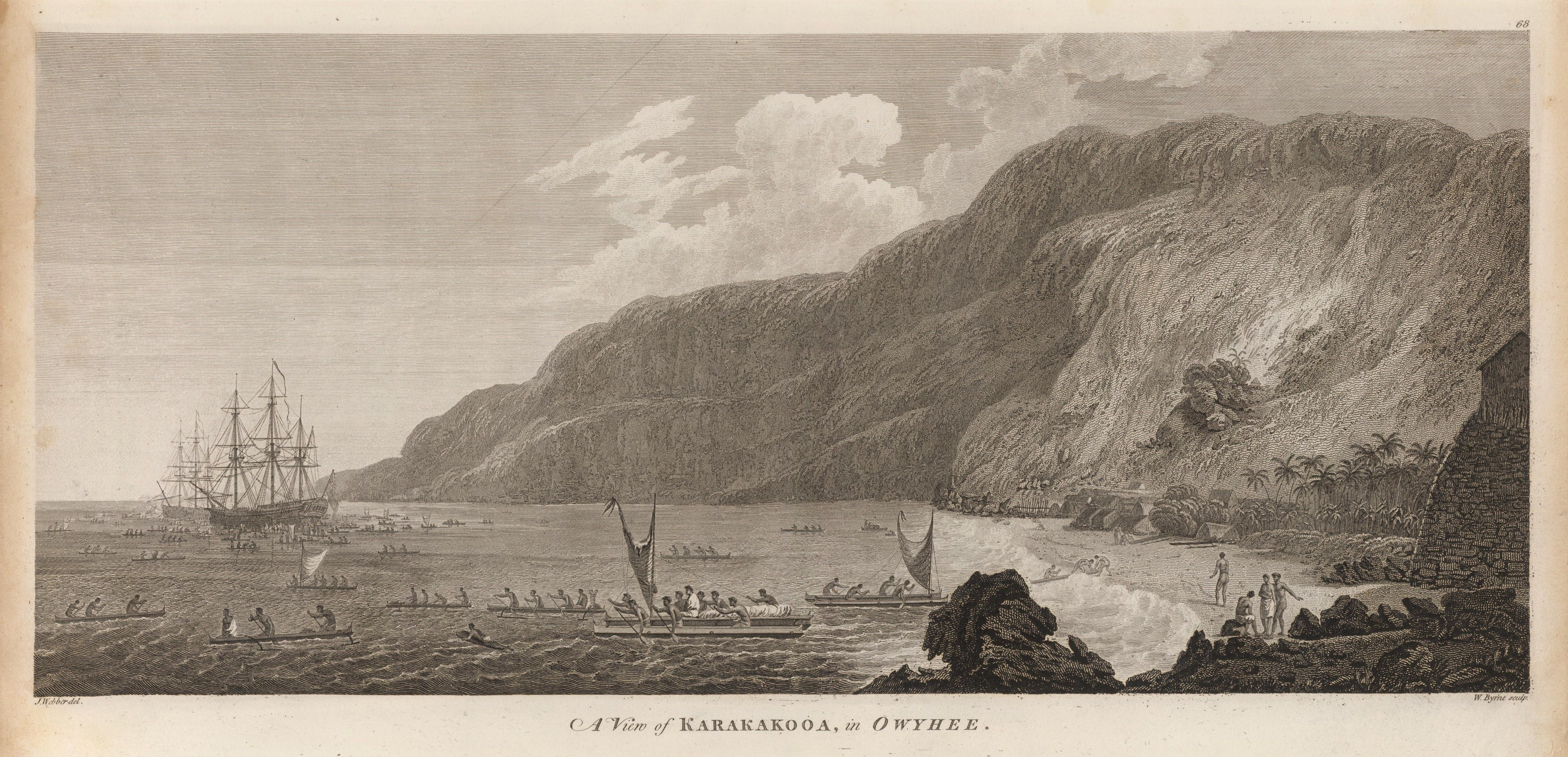
A view of Karakokooa, in Owyhee by John Webber

Ships Artist John Webber accompanied Captain James Cook to the Sandwich Islands in 1778, and in the lower left foreground of his 1781 engraving is depicted a paddleboarder/surfer.

=== Thomas Edward Blake ===
Thomas Edward Blake is credited as the pioneer in paddleboard construction in the early 1930s.

While restoring historic Hawaiian boards in 1926 for the Bernice P. Bishop Museum, Blake built a replica of the previously ignored olo surfboard ridden by ancient Hawaiian aliʻi (kings). He lightened his redwood replica (olo were traditionally made from wiliwili wood) by drilling it full of holes, which he then covered, thus creating the first hollow board, which led to creation of the modern paddleboard. Two years later, using this same 16 ft (4.9 m), 120 lb (54 kg) board, Blake won the Pacific Coast Surfriding Championship, first Mainland event integrating both surfing and paddling. Blake then returned to Hawaii to break virtually every established paddling record available, setting 1/2 mi (800 m) and 100 yd (91 m) records that stood until 1955.

In 1932, using his drastically modified chambered hollow board, now weighing roughly 60 lb (27 kg), which over the next decade he would tirelessly promote as a lifeguarding rescue tool, Blake out-paddled top California watermen Pete Peterson and Wally Burton in the first Mainland to Catalina crossing race—29 mi (47 km) in 5 hours, 53 minutes. During the 1930s, Blake-influenced hollow boards (called “cigar boards” by reporters and later “kook boxes” by surfers) would be used in roughly equal proportion to solid plank boards for both paddling and surfing until the new Hot Curl boards led wave-riding in a new direction. For paddleboarding, however, the basic principles of Blake's 1926 design remain relevant even today.

=== Renaissance ===
Paddleboarding experienced a renaissance in the early 1980s after Los Angeles County lifeguard Rabbi Norm Shifren's “Waterman Race”—22 mi (35 km) from Point Dume to Malibu—inspired surf journalist Craig Lockwood to begin production on a high-quality stock paddleboard—known as the "Waterman." Its design, which has arguably won more races than any other stock paddleboard, remains a popular choice today.

Shortly after, L.A, surfboard shaper Joe Bark and San Diego shaper Mike Eaton began production, and soon with Brian Szymanski's North County Paddleboards (NCP) became three of the largest U.S. paddleboard makers, eventually producing nearly half of the estimated 3–400 paddleboards made each year in the U.S. today.

L.A. lifeguards Gibby Gibson and Buddy Bohn revived the Catalina Classic event in 1982 for a field of 10 competitors. Concurrently in Hawaii, the annual Independence Day Paddleboard Race from Sunset to Waimea was drawing a few hundred competitors, many using surfboards due to lack of proper paddleboards on the Islands. As paddlers began ordering boards from the Mainland, local surfboard shapers like Dennis Pang (now one of Hawaii's largest paddleboard makers) moved quickly to fill the local niche. On both fronts, paddleboarding has been consistently gaining momentum and popularity.

In 1996 the sport of paddleboarding was making a comeback. Once the domain of only dedicated watermen and big wave riders in the 1950s and 60s, the sport found a new set of acolytes on the North Shore of Oahu and in Honolulu at the Outrigger Canoe Club. At that time Hawaii's top paddler was Dawson Jones. After completing the 32 mi (51 km) Catalina Classic, from Catalina Island to Manhattan Beach, Jones returned to Hawaii inspired to establish a race across the Ka’iwi Channel. In 1997, the race that is now known as the Paddleboard World Championships was born. The race sells out with both prone and stand up paddleboarders (SUP) from around the world who compete in solo and team divisions.

== Olympics ==
Paddleboarding may be added to the Olympics and the Court of Arbitration for Sport will decide whether it is represented by the International Surfing Association or the International Canoe Federation.

== Equipment ==
Paddleboards are divided by length into three classes: Stock, 14 Foot, and Unlimited. Stock boards are 12 ft (3.7 m) long, and best for paddlers around 180 lb (82 kg) or less. Stock boards are easy to accelerate and fast in choppy water. But with their short waterline, they lack the calm water top speed of 14 feet or Unlimited boards.

14-foot class boards are often considered to be the best all-around boards. At 14 ft (4.3 m) in length, they combine many of the best characteristics of stock boards with nearly the calm water speed of Unlimited boards. Only about half of all races have a 14-foot class.

Unlimited boards are the fastest boards afloat. Their speed comes from their long waterline and this also gives them a longer glide per stroke. Though usually 17 to 18 ft (5.2 to 5.5 m) long, the class is defined as "anything that floats" and boards over 20 ft (6.1 m) have been built. They can be difficult to handle in choppy water and their length makes them harder to transport and store. Modern Unlimited boards have rudders that are steered by a tiller between the paddler's feet.

There is an additional board class, the 10' 6". These boards are not used in the long ocean races that are run with the Stock, 14 Foot, and Unlimited boards, but are used in surf and sprint races. 10' 6" class boards are known by several names: Ten-Six, Sprint Board, Surf Racer, or Racing Mal.

Paddleboarding can also be done on various pieces of equipment, including surfboards. Paddleboards are made of fiberglass, epoxy, and/or carbon fiber. An emerging paddleboard technology is constructing them from epoxy surfboard, which is stronger and lighter than traditional fiberglass. The cost of new boards ranges from $1,500 to $3,500 for custom boards. Used boards that have been well kept are in high demand and can be sold fairly easily on paddleboard listing websites.

Paddleboards can utilize SpeedCoaches for training, to measure speed and record data for improvements and statistics.

=== Vessel registration fees ===
Some locations are starting to charge registration or other access fees for paddleboard use on public waterways.

== By country ==
=== United Kingdom ===
Stand-up paddleboarding is one of the UK's fastest-growing watersports, with Paddle UK membership rising from 32,000 to 90,000 during an 18-month period in the pandemic.

== Notable events ==
- Catalina Classic, California, USA – 51 km (32 mi)
- Molokai to Oahu Paddleboard World Championships, Hawaii – 51 km (32 mi)
- Hamilton Island Cup, Australia – 8 km (5 mi)
- Trent 100, United Kingdom – 100 km (62 mi)

== Notable paddleboarders ==
- Thomas Michael O'Shaughnessy, Jr. - Guinness World Record paddleboarding the English Channel; created the East Coast Paddleboard Championships held yearly in Ponce Inlet, Florida
- Jamie Mitchell - Ten-time winner of the Molokai to Oahu Paddleboard World Championships.

== Gallery ==
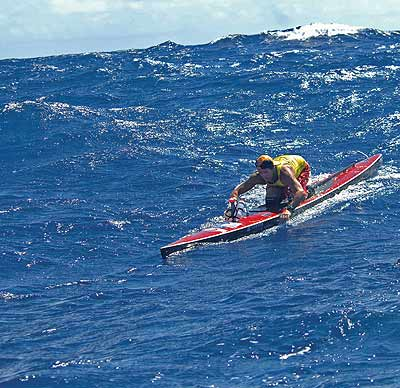
Paddleboarding in big waves

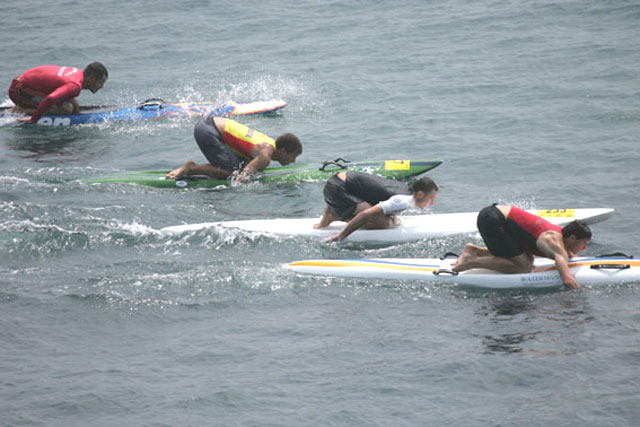
Paddleboard race

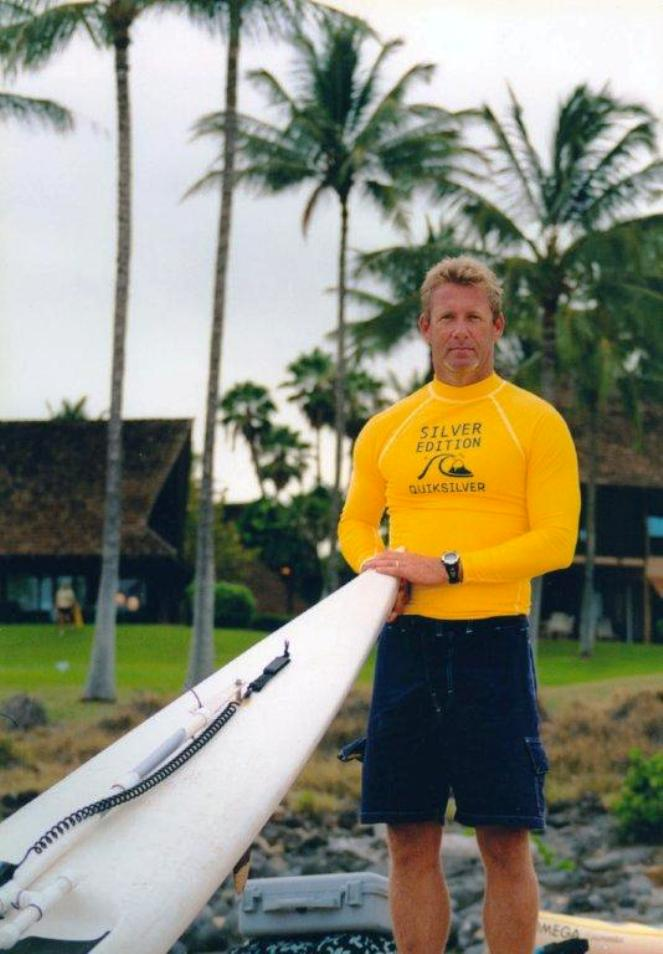
Thomas Michael O'Shaughnessy, Jr., paddleboarding record holder

== See also ==
- Standup paddleboarding
- Kayaking
