= List of mayors of Woburn, Massachusetts =

This is a list of the past and present mayors of Woburn, Massachusetts.

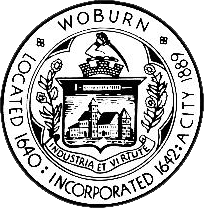
City Seal

#	Mayor	Picture	Term	Party	Notes
1	Edward Francis Johnson		January 7, 1889-January 1891	Republican & Citizens	
2	George Fremont Bean		January 1891-January 1892	Democratic & Citizens	Bean was a member of the Democratic Party, however in the 1890 election, Bean won on the Citizens Party ticket against his opponent who had received both the Democratic & Republican nominations.
3	Edward Everett Thompson		January 1892-January 1893	Republican	Twice defeated his predecessor George Fremont Bean; in the elections of 1891, and 1892 (by a 37-vote majority).
4	Philip Kearney Adams Richardson		1893-1894	Republican	
5	Hugh D. Murray		1894-January 7, 1895	Republican	
6	Montressor Tyler Allen		January 7, 1895-1897	Republican	
7	John P. Feeney		1897-1904	Democratic	
8	Lawrence G. Reade		1905–1907	Democratic	
9	William E. Blodgett		1907-1909	Republican	
10	Daniel Wilbur Bond		1909-1910	Democratic	While a Democrat Bond won election to the office of mayor as the nominee of the Republican Party.
11	Hugh D. Murray		1910–1912	Republican	
12	William H. Henchey		1913–1914	Democratic	
13	Harold P. Johnson		1915–1916	Republican	
14	Wilford D. Gray		1917–1918		
15	Bernard J. Golden		1919–1922	Democratic	
16	Stephen Sibley Bean		1923-January 5, 1925	Republican	Son of mayor George Fremont Bean, was elected Mayor of Woburn at the age of 29.
17	Thomas H. Duffy		January 5. 1925-1928	Democratic	
18	Harold P. Johnson		1928-	Republican	Second time as mayor
	Herman P. Peterson		1930–1932	Republican	Last Mayor elect to a one-year term, two year mayoral terms began in 1931.
	Alfred W. Peterson		1932	Republican	
	William Edward Kane		1938–1949	Democratic	Although a Democrat, Kane lost the 1941 and 1943 Democratic nominations, but won the Republican nominations, and was subsequently elected.
	Francis H. Murray, Jr.		1950–1955	Democratic	
	William G. Shaughnessy		1956-1960	Democratic	Served as a State Representative for the 29th Middlesex District, 1975–1979
	John “Jack” Gilgun		1960–1964	Democratic	
	Edward F. Gill		1964-1971		
	Edward P. Gilgun		1972–1977	Democratic	
	Thomas M. Higgins		1978–1983		
	John Rabbitt		1984–1994		
	Robert M. Dever		1996-2002	Democratic	
	John C. Curran		2001-January 2, 2006	Democratic	
	Thomas McLaughlin		January 2, 2006 – January 4, 2010		
	Scott D. Galvin		January 4, 2010- January 2, 2024	Democratic	
