= Lough Cutra Castle =

19th-century castle in County Galway, Ireland

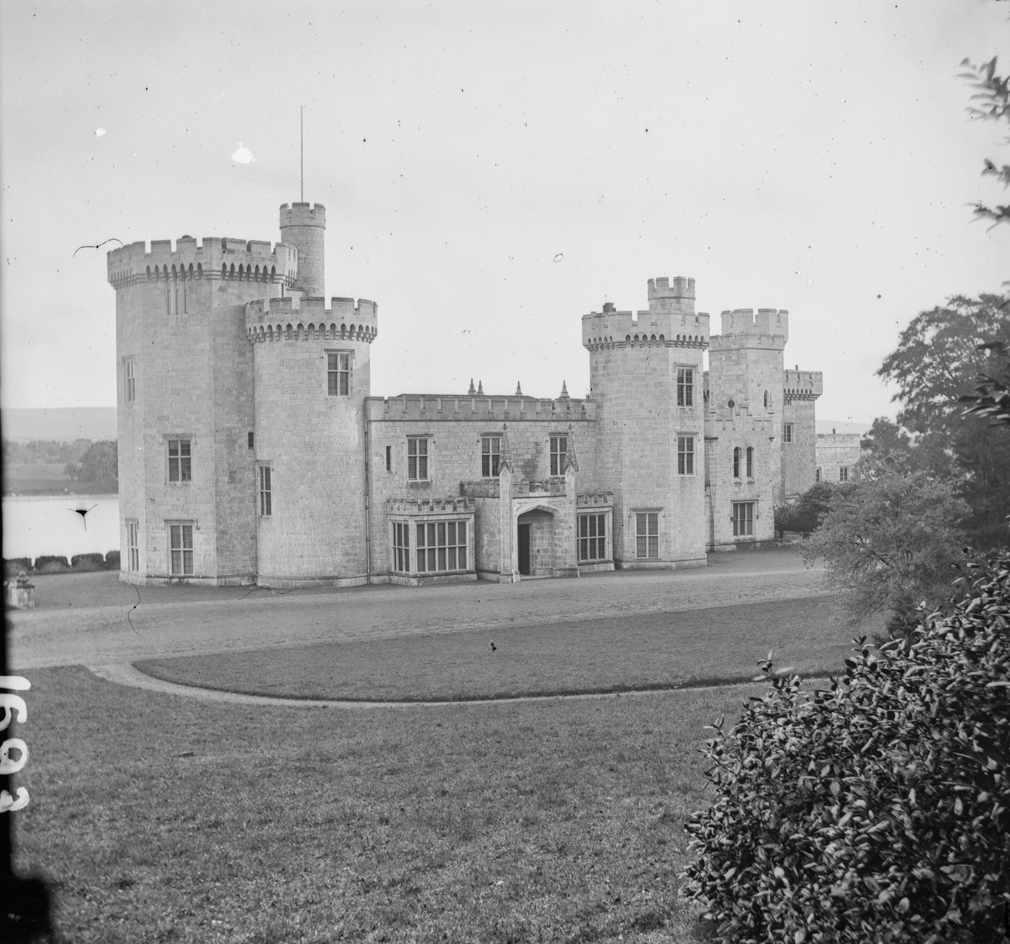

- Location within Ireland
- 53.0237°N 8.8031°W
- Location: Lough Cutra, County Galway, Ireland

History
- Built: 1817

Site notes
- Architect: John Nash
- Owner: Gwyn Jones family

Lough Cutra Castle is a privately owned 19th-century castle located near Gort in south County Galway, Ireland. The castle was designed by English architect John Nash for Colonel Charles Vereker, 2nd Viscount Gort. Construction started in 1811 and was completed in 1817. The castle was later acquired by and a residence of Hugh Gough, 1st Viscount Gough. The castle was purchased by Standish Vereker, 7th Viscount Gort in 1952 and restored by Sir Humphry Wakefield, then husband of Gort's great-niece the Hon. Elizabeth Sidney.

== Location ==
Lough Cutra Castle is located 3 km (1.9 mi) south of Gort beside Lough Cutra lake on an area of 600 acres. The lake is 1000 acres in size and is Europe's largest privately owned lake. The Lough Cutra Castle Triathlon, which is part of the Castle Race Series, has been held every May since 2012 in the grounds of the castle, with those grounds open to the public for the event.

== Visitors ==
During their state visit to Ireland in May 2015, future king Prince Charles and Camilla, Duchess of Cornwall, stayed at the castle over three days and hosted a state dinner for 18 guests in the castle dining room, guests included the President of Ireland, Michael D. Higgins and his wife Sabina.
