= Molokai to Oahu Paddleboard World Championships =

Annual Hawaiian paddleboard race

The Molokai to Oahu Paddleboard World Championships is an annual paddleboard race between the islands of Molokai and Oahu, Hawaii. The 32 mile (51 kilometer) race is one of Hawaii's most prestigious open-water sporting events, drawing participants from Hawaii and the U.S. mainland as well as internationally. The event has been called one of the world's most challenging paddleboard races and is considered the world championship for the sport.

The event contains competition in several disciplines, including prone, standup paddleboard, and foil. The first race was held in July, 1997.

== Course ==
The race for prone and standup paddleboard starts from the Kaluakoi Beach Area on the western tip of Molokai and finishes at Maunalua Bay Beach Park, on Oahu. The event is preceded by a pre-race pule (Hawaiian blessing).

The race crosses the Kaiwi Channel, also known as the Molokai Channel, which has a reputation of being one of the more difficult ocean channels in the world to cross because of frequent strong winds, large swells, strong currents, and unpredictability. The channel, which has a maximum depth of 2,200 ft (670 m), is sometimes referred to as "the boneyard", from the Hawaiian word kaiwi, meaning "bone".

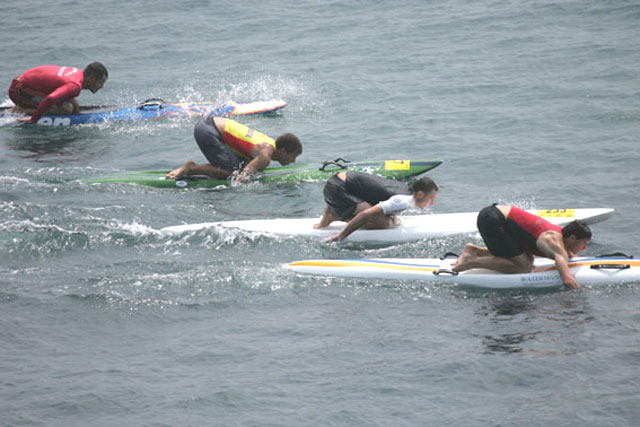
Paddleboard race

== History ==
In 1953 a California lifeguard named Tom Zahn crossed the Kaiwi Channel between Molokai and Oahu on a paddleboard, showing its feasibility. For years afterwards paddleboard competitions were held in the waters around Oahu but not between islands. In the mid 1990s, Hawaii’s top paddler was Dawson Jones. In 1996 Jones completed the 32 mile Catalina Classic, a paddleboard race in California from Manhattan Beach to the island of Catalina. Jones came back to Hawaii inspired to establish a race across the Kaiwi Channel, which was of a similar distance. He joined with his training partners, Garrett McNamara and Mike Takahashi, and in July 1997 the first competitive paddleboard race was held between Molokai and Oahu.

== Race ==
The event, often referred to as the "M2O", is held in the end of July, the summer season typically being a period of calmer waves and an off-season for surfing. The number of competitors is generally limited to 250.

Race categories have evolved over the years. As of 2026 there were four broad categories: paddleboard (prone), standup paddleboard (SUP), SUP Foil and Wing. The Foil/Wing race was held on July 20, and the paddleboard and SUP race on July 26, 2026. Categories have subdivisions by gender and age. Paddleboarders may register in a Stock class (boards 12' and under), or Unlimited (boards 13' or greater). Paddleboard and SUP applicants must demonstrate they can paddle 10 miles (16 km) in two hours. Entrants may also compete in teams.

Top competitors can complete the course in less than five hours. Race times vary considerably depending on the ocean and weather conditions.

In 2020, due to the Covid-19 virus, a "virtual M2O" race was initiated, which has continued to the present. The virtual race allows "anyone, anywhere" to register and complete any course of 16 miles (26 km), then upload their results, videos, and stories to the race website.

In 2026, organizers initiated a "Channel Masters" classification for athletes who had completed both the Molokai to Oahu (end of July) and the Catalina Classic in California (end of August), in the same summer. Each race covers 32 miles. In 2026, 20 athletes accomplished this. An even more elite group are those who have won both events in the same summer, referred to as a "Single Double". As of September 2026, only eight athletes had achieved this.

== Records ==
Prone records date from 1997. SUP competition began in 2006, Foil began in 2018 and Wing in 2023.

Event	Men	Women
Prone Unlimited	4:18:03, 2026, Charlie Verco (Australia)	4:50:58, 2019, Harriet Brown (Australia)
Prone Stock	4:43:46, 2019, Stewart McClachlan (Australia)	5:25:23, 2019, Madison Spencer (Australia)
SUP Unlimited	3:59:52, 2017, Travis Grant (Australia)	4:34:09, 2019, Terrene Black (Australia)
SUP Stock	4:12:08, 2019, Josh Riccio (Florida)	5:49:10, 2012, Rachel Bruntsch (USA)
SUP Foil	1:56:55, 2025, Edo Tanas (Italy)	2:19:51, 2025, Annie Reickert (Hawaii)
SUP Wing	1:31:29, 2023, Finn Spencer (Hawaii)	2:08:03, 2025, Lily Buden (Hawaii)

== In television ==
The race was featured on the reboot TV series Hawaii Five-0 in the opening sequence of Season 2, Episode 2, which aired in September, 2011. The show mixed archival footage of actual races with filmed-for-TV sequences.
