= Cenél Áeda na hEchtge =

Historic area of Ireland

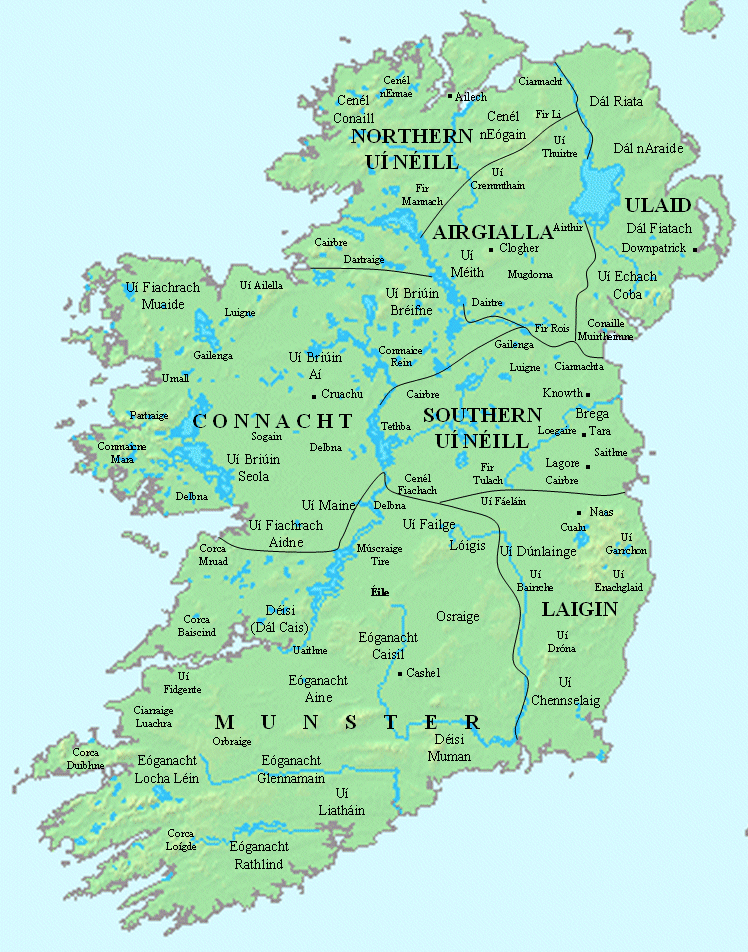
Early peoples and kingdoms of Ireland, c.800

Cenél Áeda na hEchtge (also Cenél Áeda, Kenloth, Kinalethes, Kenealea, Kinelea) was a trícha cét (later a cantred, (a branch of the Uí Fiachrach Aidhne) and which was the original formation of the southern part of the barony of Kiltartan, County Galway. This was the clan name of the O Shaughnessys and O Cahills who both ruled the territory until the O Cahills were forced from the area by the O Shaughnessys. The latter remained chiefs of the area until 1691 and the head family survived in the Gort area till the demise of the senior line in the 18th century. The name was taken after the cenél (kindred) of Aedh, uncle to King Guaire Aidne mac Colmáin of Connacht (died 663).

It consisted of what are now the parishes of Beagh, Kilbecanty, Kilmacduagh, Kiltartan, Kilthomas (now Peterswell).

The Uí Fiachrach Aidhne originally kings of all Connacht (modern province of Connacht with all of County Clare and parts of County Limerick - see Thomond) by the late 8th century they were largely reduced to their home territory i.e. the area of the later Kilmacduagh diocese.

Another trícha in the area was Cenél Guaire, named after Guaire Aidne mac Colmáin.

The word Echtge refers to the Slieve Aughty, beside which it was located.

== Lords of Cenél Áeda ==
- Melaghlin Reagh Ua Seachnasaigh, died 1179
- Gilla na Naemh Crom Ó Seachnasaigh, died 1224
- Diarmaid Ó Seachnasaigh, before 1533-after 1544
- Ruaidhrí Gilla Dubh Ó Seachnasaigh, before 1567-1569
- Diarmaid Riabach Ó Seachnasaigh, 1569–1573
- Liam Ó Seachnasaigh
- Dermot Ó Seachnasaigh
- Roger Gilla Dubh Ó Seachnasaigh
- Dermott Ó Seachnasaigh
- Roger O'Shaughnessey
- William O'Shaughnessy, 1673-1744
- Colman O'Shaughnessy
- Roebuck O'Shaughnessey
- Joseph O'Shaughnessey
- Bartholomew O'Shaughnessey

== See also ==
- trícha cét
