= Hamilton Island Cup =

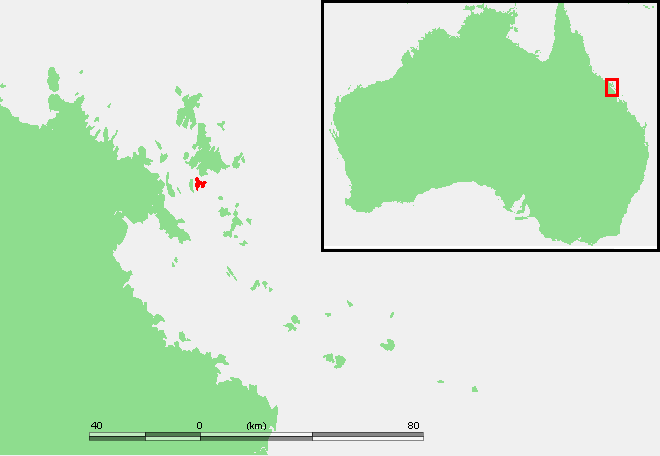
- Hamilton Island Location
- Sport: Outrigger Canoe Racing
- Founded: 1983
- No. of teams: 45+
- Competitors: 1000+ (International)
- Country: Australia
- Region: Hamilton Island
- Official website: www.hamiltonisland.com.au

Set against the backdrop of the Whitsunday Islands, on Queensland's Great Barrier Reef - Hamilton Island Cup has evolved to become a 4-day multi-disciplined outrigger paddling regatta and Australia's premier outrigger canoeing event.

== History ==
In 1981, Hamilton Island entrepreneur Keith Williams, had founded Sea World, a Gold Coast-based tourist attraction and simultaneously created an outrigger crew largely composed of staff members, while local Gold Coast realtor and friend, Max Christmas was associated with the Outrigger Canoe Club of Australia, founded in 1978. Two rival crews were created; the ‘Max Christmas Gold Coast’ team (in actuality an Outrigger Australia crew) and Keith’s ‘Sea World’ team. They were to compete against each other on Hamilton Island in 1983 at what was considered a trial run of the subsequent Hamilton Cup founded the year after in 1984, coincidentally providing much needed media attention for Keith’s new resort project on Hamilton Island.

By 1984 the first Hamilton race was able to be staged as there were enough canoes and paddlers to make the event worth staging. It was billed as the, ‘Queensland Outrigger Titles’. In later years the event was renamed the Hamilton Cup, and as the sports popularity grew - the number of events and size of the carnival grew. The 4 day event became known as the Hamilton Island Cup, with the signature race - the 42 km marathon event - becoming known as The Hamilton Cup. The Australian Outrigger Canoe Racing Association consider the Hamilton Cup as being one of the most prestigious and challenging major events on the Australian Outrigging Calendar.

In June 2008, the 25th anniversary of the original 1983 race was celebrated. The 25th anniversary event featured over 2000 paddlers, representing 43 Australian clubs and 10 overseas-based clubs from Hawaii, Hong Kong, Singapore, Tahiti, Papua New Guinea and New Zealand. In 2010 Stand Up Paddleboarding (SUP) was included as a discipline for the first time - indicating the growing popularity of this discipline in Australia.

== Divisions & Races ==
- OC6 16 km
- OC6 500m/1000m
- OC6 Changeover
- OC1 16 km
- OC1/SUP 8 km
- OC1/OC2 SUP 250m
- OC2 16 km
- OC2 8 km

== Off-Water Events ==
Hamilton Island Race Week has a number of social events at the island resort during the Hamilton Island Cup event. The most famous event is King of the Mountain footrace, where runners must race a steep 6 km loop from the resort centre to Passage Peak (the highest peak in the Whitsunday Islands at 234 metres).

== See also ==
- Sport in Queensland
