= Dermott Ó Seachnasaigh =

Sir Dermott Ó Seachnasaigh, Chief of the Name, died 1673.

Ó Seachnasaigh was married to Joan, daughter of Lord Barrymore and had sons Roger and Cormac. A copy of his will survives.

Preceded by Roger Gilla Dubh Ó Seachnasaigh	Lord of Cenél Áeda na hEchtge before 1650–1673	Succeeded by Roger O'Shaughnessey
