= Lough Cutra =

Lake in County Galway, Ireland

- Loch Cútra (Irish)
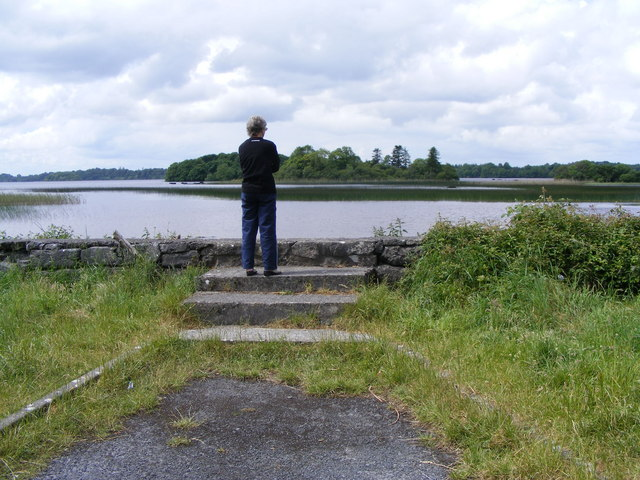
- Lough Cutra and Parsons Island

- Location within Ireland
- Location: County Galway, Ireland
- Coordinates: 53.035059°N 8.781464°W
- Primary inflows: Owendalulleegh River
- Primary outflows: Beagh River
- Basin countries: Ireland
- Surface area: 3.9 km^{2} (1.5 sq mi)
- Surface elevation: 35 m (115 ft)
- Islands: Castle Island, Beagh Island, Rick's Island, Hawthorn Island, Holly Island, Keaghery Island, Apple Island, Swan Island

Lough Cutra (formerly Lough Cooter, Irish: Loch Cútra) is a lake in County Galway, Ireland located beside Lough Cutra Castle. It is the site of a Special Area of Conservation.

Ardamullivan Castle lies 2 km (1 mile) to the southwest.

== See also ==
- List of loughs in Ireland
- List of Special Areas of Conservation in the Republic of Ireland
