= Joseph O'Shaughnessey =

Irish Chief of the Name

Joseph O'Shaughnessey (died 1783) was an Irish Chief of the Name.

Joseph was the eldest son of the previous chief, Roebuck, and had siblings William, Mary, Catherine, Ellice, Elleanor, all alive in 1784. He and his family, along with the local gentry, forcibly gained possession of the former family mansion on the square of Gort, around 1760. The occasion caused much jubilation, with the church bells of Athenry and Galway ringing in support. However, he was never able to gain legal possession, and died without gaining the ancient family property.

Joseph died in 1783 without issue, though his brother and sisters were apparently still alive. The succession of the senior line becomes unclear after this point.

Preceded by Colman O'Shaughnessey	O'Shaughnessy before 1762–1783	Succeeded by Bartholomew O'Shaughnessey
