= Diarmaid Riabach Ó Seachnasaigh =

Diarmaid Riabach Ó Seachnasaigh, Chief of the Name, died 1579.

== Annalistic references ==
- M1573.6. Murrough, the son of Dermot, son of Murrough O'Brien, was slain by Ulick Burke, the son of Rickard, who was son of Ulick-na-gCeann, and O'Shaughnessy, i.e. Dermot Reagh, the son of Dermot, who was son of William, son of John Boy. O'Shaughnessy was the man who laid hands on him. John Burke deprived O'Shaughnessy of Gort-insi-Guaire, in revenge of the killing of his kinsman.

Preceded by Ruaidhrí Gilla Dubh Ó Seachnasaigh	Lord of Cenél Áeda na hEchtge before 1569–1573	Succeeded by Liam Ó Seachnasaigh
