= Bartholomew O'Shaughnessey =

Bartholomew O'Shaughnessey, Chief of the Name, born 1789, alive 1843.

O'Shaughnessy was a barber living in Galway in the 1840s who was the apparent Chief of the Name to the O'Shaughnessey family. He married and had family, as did his younger brother, Andrew (born 1796). The succession of the senior line after this time is unknown.

Preceded by Joseph O'Shaughnessey	O'Shaughnessy before 1789–after 1843	Succeeded by unknown
