= William G. Shaughnessy =

American politician

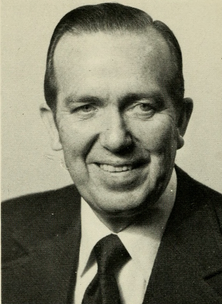

Member of the Massachusetts House of Representatives for the 29th Middlesex district
- In office 1975–1979

Mayor of Woburn, Massachusetts
- In office 1956–1960
- Preceded by: Francis H. Murray, Jr.
- Succeeded by: Jack Gilgun

Personal details
- Born: July 10, 1918 Woburn, Massachusetts, U.S.
- Died: July 21, 2001 (aged 83) Burlington, Massachusetts, U.S. (aged 83)
- Party: Democratic
- Education: Bentley School of Accounting and Finance
- Occupation: Accountant; Package store owner Politician

William G. Shaughnessy (July 10, 1918 – July 21, 2001) was an American politician who served as mayor of Woburn, Massachusetts, and was a member of the Massachusetts House of Representatives.

== Early life ==
Shaughnessy was born on July 10, 1918, in Woburn. He graduated from Woburn High School and the Bentley School of Accounting and Finance. Outside of politics, Shaughnessy worked as an accountant and was the president of Wells Package Store, Inc.

== Political career ==
From 1948 to 1951, Shaughnessy was a member of the Woburn school committee. He then served on the city council from 1954 to 1955. From 1956 to 1960 he was the mayor of Woburn. In 1958 he was a candidate for State Treasurer. He lost in the Democratic primary to incumbent John Francis Kennedy 62% to 38%.

Shaughnessy returned to elected office in 1975 as a member of the Massachusetts House of Representatives. He represented the 29th Middlesex district until 1979.

== Death ==
Shaughnessy died on July 21, 2001, at the Lahey Clinic in Burlington, Massachusetts.
