= Fiddaun Castle =

Tower house in County Galway, near County Clare, Ireland

- Fiodh Duin
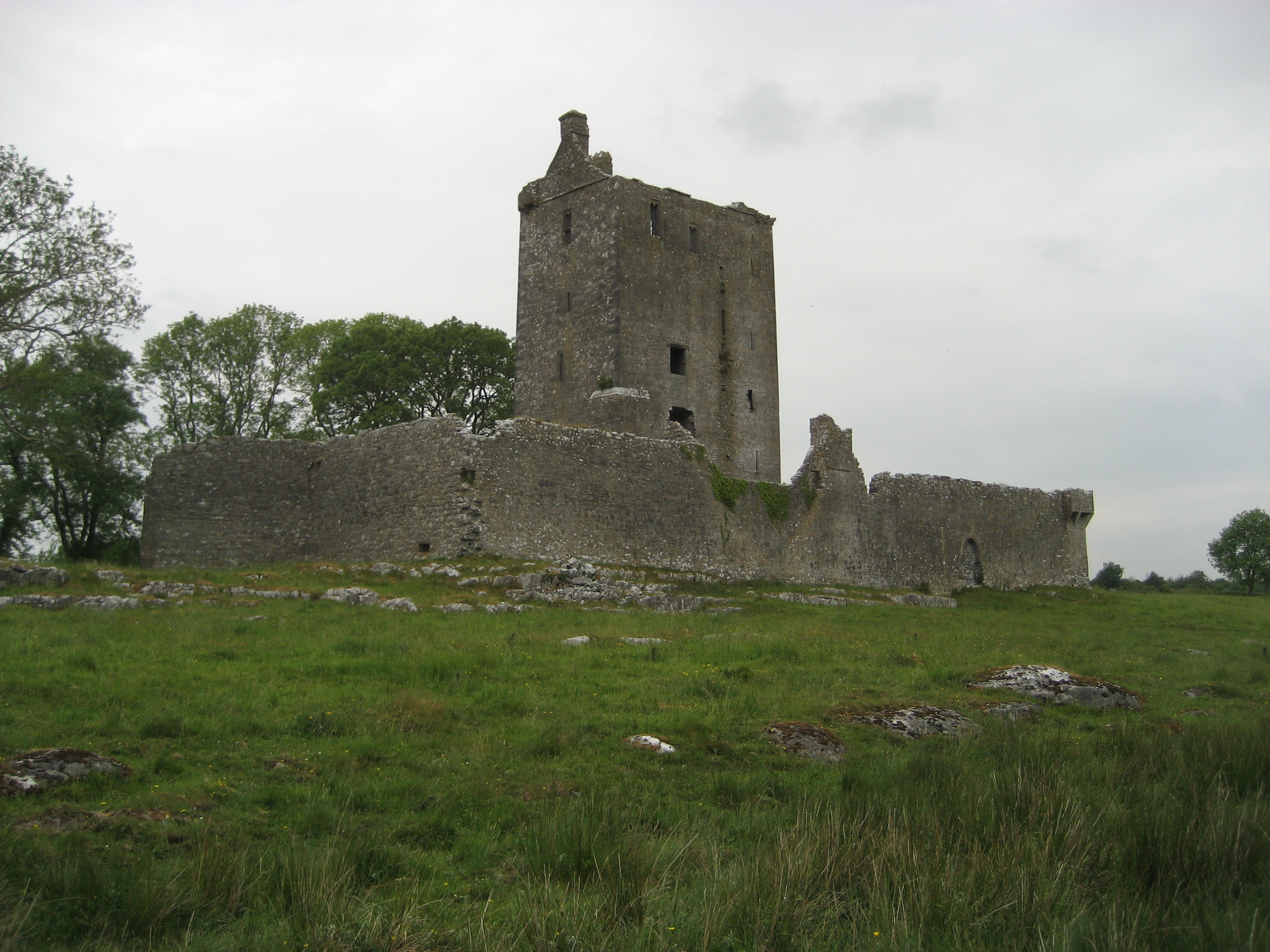
- Fiddaun Castle

- Location within Ireland

General information
- Status: in ruins
- Type: tower house
- Location: near Tubber, County Galway, Ireland
- Coordinates: 53°0′38″N 8°52′43″W
- Estimated completion: mid-16th century

National monument of Ireland
- Official name: Fiddaun Castle
- Reference no.: 206

Fiddaun Castle is a tower house in Tubber, County Galway, close to the border of County Clare in Ireland. It is a National Monument of Ireland.

== Name ==
Fiodh Duin means "wood of the fort" in Irish.

== Geography ==
Fiddaun Castle is situated between Lough Doo and Lough Aslaun near the modern village of Tubber.

== History ==
Fiddaun is a mid-16th century Irish tower house in the Kiltartan barony of the Uí Fiachrach Aidhne, one of four O'Shaughnessy castles.

Fiddaun was most likely built by Sir Roger Gilla Dubh Ó Seachnasaigh, as he is the first mentioned living there and it is not known before his time.

== Today ==
This tower house is most noted for its well preserved inner bawn wall. It is located on private land and maintained by the Office of Public Works.
