= Patrick Shaughnessy =

- Born: United States
- Other name: Spark
- Occupation: Businessman
- Years active: 1975-2015
- Awards: Clio Award Winner for producing Tomorrow Media

Patrick "Spark" Shaughnessy is an American businessman in the media industry who was the president and CEO of AVI Communications, Inc. in Lewisville, Texas and owner of Spark Shaughnessy and Associates, talent agency. Spark, has spent his entire 40 year career in media and created sales and business development tools for United States local television and radio stations during the 1990s.

Shaughnessy was recognised by the media industry and has been awarded a Clio Award, a Gold Medal for film production from the New York Film Festival, and he also served as Executive Producer of the Coca-Cola Centennial Celebration with an audience of 14,000 bottlers from 140 countries.

Patrick is a marathon runner an as of 2013, had completed 9 marathons. He is a father of seven children. He and his wife, Nancy, reside in Dallas, Texas.

== Career ==
Shaughnessy began work in Omaha, Nebraska in radio advertising sales, which led him to management and later to his becoming vice president and General Manager of a Los Angeles radio station.

After seven years in L.A. he was recruited by Roy Disney to head up TM Communications in Dallas, Texas which he later bought from Disney. TM produced award-winning syndicated radio shows, advertising campaigns, corporate shows, and also owned radio stations.

After selling TM Communications and his radio stations he formed AVI Communications, Inc. in 1991 which produced and syndicated worldwide video sales training programs for radio, TV, and Cable companies hosted by New York Times best selling author, Jason Jennings. He also had a syndicated golf tips for TV stations featuring such golf greats as Ben Crenshaw, Tom Kite, Byron Nelson, and Butch Harmon. AVI developed new business for TV stations through its Brand Your Business seminars and by creating advertising campaigns for advertisers. In addition, he founded a literary / talent agency.

=== AVI Communications ===
AVI Communications based in Lewisville, Texas was a private company categorized under Studio Equipment, Radio and Television Broadcasting. It was established in 1991 and incorporated in Texas.

AVI Communications served broadcasters with Quantum DVD sales training, and a variety of other business development services for broadcasters and their advertisers. It also provided "Brand Your Business" seminars throughout the United States for television stations and their local clientele.

=== Spark Shaughnessy and Associates ===
Spark Shaughnessy & Associates was a boutique talent agency born out of Shaughnessy's personal history and desire to help others realize their potential through literary, film, video, and other performance oriented creative endeavors.

The firm's criteria for selecting and representing clients were that the client must be likeable, talented, flexible, patient, and collaborative.

== Recognition and legacy ==
He was executive producer and Gold Medal award winner for film production for the New York Film Festival for "Radio, The Power of Sound"
