= Thomas Michael O'Shaughnessy Jr. =

American athlete

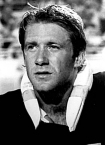
Thomas Michael O'Shaugnessy

Thomas Michael O'Shaughnessy Jr. (born in Fort Bragg, North Carolina on October 17, 1956) is a member of the UCF Athletics Hall of Fame, real estate agent

== UCF Athletics ==
A two-sport athlete for the University of Central Florida Fighting Knights in baseball and football, O'Shaughnessy was a defensive lineman for the University of Central Florida (UCF) football team during the program's first two seasons of play in 1979 and 1980. As a defensive end on Don Jonas' inaugural football team, O'Shaughnessy, a Winter Park, Florida native, was one of the top defensive players the Knights fielded. He established a current school record for sacks in a game with five against Emory & Henry University during the 1979 season.

Leading his team both seasons with 10 sacks in 1979 and 12 sacks in 1980 placed him among UCF's all-time best with 22 career sacks. At UCF Athletics, he was an Assistant Offense line coach for Football in 1981, the Founder and Founding President of UCF Letterman's K Club, the Knights Booster Board of Directors, and UCF sideline radio reporter for UCF football games from 1990 through 1994. O'Shaughnessy was a member of the 1979 UCF Baseball team, UCF's first championship baseball team as part of the Sunshine State Conference.

O'Shaughnessy was inducted into the UCF's Hall of Fame on April 16, 2010.

On June 29, 2023, O'Shaughnessy was named in the rankings from SBNATION as one of the Top 100 Greatest UCF Male Athletes.

== Paddleboarder/surfer ==
• Credited by PaddleGuru with introducing the Unlimited sport of paddle boarding to the East Coast and Florida in 1997. Until then, the sport existed in the 10'6 class exclusive only to Life Guards races and short sprint races at surf contests in the 1960s.

• Created the Key West Classic – 1998 - The Original East Coast Paddleboard Championships ~ The East Coast's longest continuing annual paddleboard race.

• Established the Florida State Paddleboard Championships in 1998 as part of the annual Easter Surfing Festival in Cocoa Beach in partnership with surfing legend Dick Catri. The first participants included Tim Ritter and Derek Levy and Mark Levy of the Southern California Paddleboard Club. Notable racers since include World Champion Ryan Butcher from South Africa 2003 and 8-time Molokai Winner, Jamie Mitchell from Australia 2007.

• Created the first of many "Full Moon" paddles from Cuba to the US, in 2000, in partnership with Quicksilver. Brought what was at that time some of the best paddlers in the sport together to attempt a paddle to Cuba from Key West against the Gulf Stream. Notables included World Champion Tim Gair, Gene Rink, Guy Pere, Mike Takahashi, Dale Hope, and The Hennessy Expedition Team through Tim Ritter & JP Cruz. After paddling for 22-plus hours in the relay with three teams, the boat captains called the expedition in great protest due to safety and fuel concerns. Derek Levy, Mike Lee, and Jeff Horn, all of the Southern California Paddleboard Club, and O'Shaughnessy got back on their boards and paddled back 105 miles after only a day and a half of rest, they established a Guinness World Record by being the first and fastest to cross what is known as the "Florida Straits," from Havana Harbor to the southernmost buoy of the United States in Key West. The 19 hours and 19 minutes were set, which is still the standing Guinness World Record for the fastest crossing of the Florida Straits. This paddle was considered a revival of the classic Ultra Paddles.

• Only person to paddle from Cuba to the USA three separate times.

• Executive Produced "BIG BLUE RIVER" a made-for-television documentary film. This was the first ever paddleboard film made which was directed by his wife Leslie ("Leslie Rules") Windram O'Shaughnessy. A classic tale of first Cuba to USA adventure, capturing the sport as it was transforming from the underground to the mainstream.

• In 2001, an O'Shaughnessy-lead team went back to conquer the BIG BLUE RIVER, paddling 112 miles in the relay, escorted by Hawaiian Tropic's 80-foot sailing yacht "Princess Sterling." That team consisted of all-Florida paddlers; Rob Delaune and Craig Snell of Key West and Jim McCrady of Fort Lauderdale. At that time, this was considered the longest relay of its kind in the sport of paddle boarding. Time on this paddle was 20 hours and 2 minutes.

• Organized the Millennium Woman Paddle in conjunction with a four-team relay from Cuba known as the "Full Moon Cuba Paddle." This included an International team from England with David Smart, Jason DeGroot, Jimmy McKenzie and Monty Young; The Leslie Rules Team from Clearwater Beach with JP Atherholt, Skip Maxwell, John Sedely and Jack Hunsucker; The Millennium Woman Team of Aline Patterson, Hayley Bateup (Australia), Nikki Mocke (South Africa) and Jenna Worlock (South Africa); and the Hurricane Team of Brian Bencie (Delray Beach), Jay Mays (Ormond Beach), Ryan Butcher (South Africa) and O'Shaughnessy. This paddle was done in 8–14 foot, wind-swept seas. GPS readings counted 142 miles with a rum-line distance of 112. The International/English Team did not finish.

- Founder of the Key West Classic annual paddleboard race held annually around Key West.
- Created and maintains the Annual EAST COAST PADDLEBOARD CHAMPIONSHIPS in Key West - now Ponce Inlet, Florida - as of 2010, in its 13th year.
- Created the Trinity Paddle - English Channel, Loch Ness, and Irish Sea - paddling 3 bodies of water in nine days, in 2006.
- Holds the Guinness World Record on the English Channel of 5:08 (Five Hours and Eight Minutes), 2006.
- Holds the Unofficial World Record on Loch Ness of 5:47 (Five Hours and Forty-Seven Minutes), 2006. (3 AM start - 40-degree water 40-degree air temp)
- Holds the Unofficial World Record on the Irish Sea from Fair Head Ballycastle to The Mull of Kintyre, Scotland in 2:39 (Two Hours and Thirty-Nine Minutes), eclipsing the old record by over 3 ½ hours set by the Hennessey Expedition Team, 2006.
- Created Olde Daytona Beach Ocean Festival, 2005.
- Created the "Poor Man's Catalina" – a first-ever in the sport, paddling solo with no escort from

Abalone Cove – Palos Verdes to White's Beach - Catalina (22 miles) and back the next day from Abalone to Torrance Beach (28 miles), 2001.

- Cape Canaveral Paddle - paddled 28 miles from Playlinda Beach to Cocoa Beach - Pre 9/11.
- Paddled Alcatraz / San Francisco Bay, 2000.
- Introduced the first Unlimited paddleboard to Ireland, in1998.
- Introduced paddle boarding to the Cuban media June 2000 Marina Hemingway, Cuba
- Created, designed & Maintained www.paddleboards.com for ten years, which later merged with BARKOCEAN to form www.paddleboard.com.
- Established Leslie Rules "One Hundred Fools" Paddling Club and The Leslie Rules Label, 1998.
- The first person from Florida to paddle in the Catalina Classic, in 1998 & 1999.
- Created The Daytona Beach Surf and Paddle Club, in 1998.
- Six-time Overall Winner of the Florida State Paddleboard Championships.
- Four-time Overall Winner of East Coast Paddleboard Championships.

Notable Finishes:

- 2000 Velzy - Stevens Pier- to - Pier Paddleboard Race 1st - 40 + Division.
- 2000 US Paddle Board Championships 4th - 40 + Division and 5th Overall.
- 1999 US Paddleboard Championships 3rd - 40+ Division and 7th Overall.
- As of 2008 participated in over 53 paddleboard races, taking 1st in all categories 30 times, 7 times Second Place, 4 Third Places and 3 Fourth Place finishes.
- Creator of the East Coast and Florida State Paddleboard Perpetual Trophies.
- Founder of East Coast Paddleboard Association, a not-for-profit 501C3.
