= Roger O'Shaughnessy =

Sir Roger O'Shaughnessy, The O'Shaughnessy (died 11 July 1690), was Chief of the Name and a captain in the Irish army of James II of England. He was present at the Battle of the Boyne, and died ("sick, though not wounded") ten days after the battle at his castle in Gort. All his property was declared forfeit, and his son and heir, William O'Shaughnessy, was forced into exile.

In 1697 Roger's estates were granted to Sir Thomas Prendergast, 1st Baronet, a Catholic neighbor; who had previously been a Jacobite and Confederate and had lost most of his own estates during the Cromwellian Wars; but this time decided to switch sides. There followed decades of legal disputes with the Prendergasts, but the O'Shaughnessy family were never able to recover them.

== Family ==
Roger was the son of Dermot O'Shaughnessy.

He married Helena, daughter of Conor O'Brien, a son of Donogh O'Brien, 4th Earl of Thomond. Her brother was William O'Brien.

Their children were:

- Helena. She married Theobald Butler. They had three children: Francis, John and Theobald.
- Major General William O'Shaughnessy, The O'Shaughnessy.

Roger O'Shaughnessy succeeded to the O'Shaugnessy lands in Ireland in 1678.

Preceded by Dermott Ó Seachnasaigh	Lord of Cenél Áeda na hEchtge before 1673–1691	Succeeded by William O'Shaughnessy
