= Diarmaid Ó Seachnasaigh =

Irish chieftain

Diarmaid Ó Seachnasaigh, Irish knight and Chief of the Name, died before 1567.

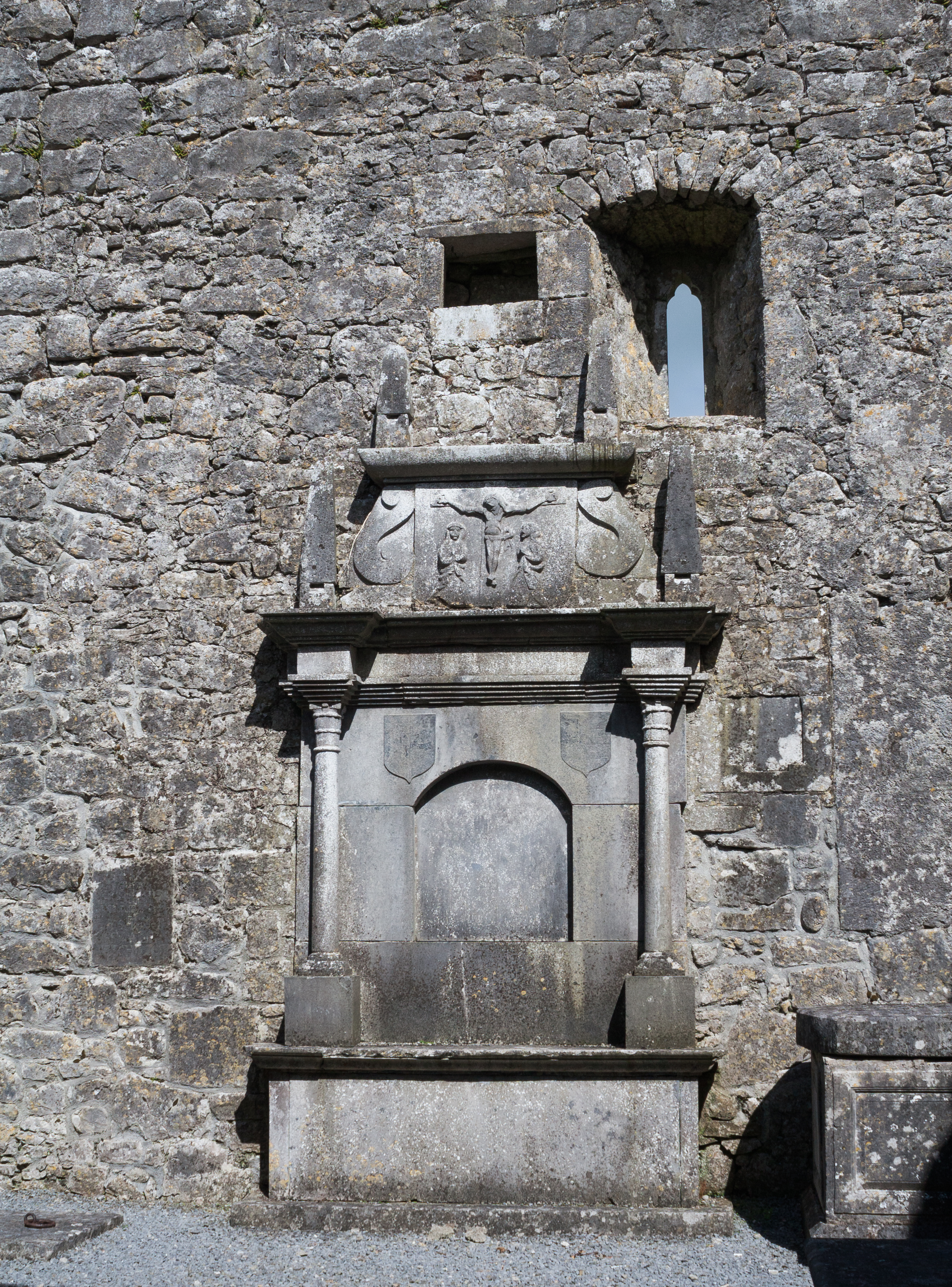
Tomb of Diarmaid Ó Seachnasaigh in the north transept of Kilmacduagh Cathedral

Ó Seachnasaigh was a descendant of Seachnasach mac Donnchadh, himself a descendant of the kings of Uí Fiachrach Aidhne. Successive Ó Seachnasaigh's have ruled the district of Cenél Áeda na hEchtge since at least the 13th century. The clan had been vassals of either the Ó Briain of Thomond or the Burke of Clanricarde, supremacy depending.

For over two hundred years Ireland west of the River Shannon had been beyond the pale of the Anglo-Irish administration based in Dublin. From 1533, Henry VIII began integrating them into his realm, knighting Diarmaid Ó Seachnasaigh and representatives of other clans. Henry later evolved this into the policy of Surrender and regrant. Ó Seachnasaigh's submission of 9 June 1543 stated that:

All the manors, lordshipps, towns and town-lands of Gortynchegory, Dromneyll, Dellyncallan, Ballyhide, Monynean, Ardgossan, Ballyegyn, Kapparell, Clonehaghe, Tollenagan, Lycknegarishe, Crege, Karrynges, Tirrelagh, Rathvilledowne, Ardmylowan, one-third part of Droneskenan and Rath; the moiety of Flyngeston, Ardvillegoghe, Dromleballehue, Cowle, and Beke

were now to be held by him and his male heirs to the crown.

Sir Diarmaid Ó Seachnasaigh married Mór Pheachach Ní Briain. The Annals of the Four Masters record her death sub anno 1569:

More Phecagh, daughter of Brian, the son of Teige, son of Turlough, son of Brian Catha-an-aenaigh O'Brien, and wife of O'Shaughnessy, i.e. Dermot, the son of William, son of John Boy, a woman distinguished for her beauty and munificence, died.

Their children were Sir Ruaidhrí Gilla Dubh Ó Seachnasaigh and Diarmaid Riabach Ó Seachnasaigh.

Preceded by Gilla na Naemh Crom Ó Seachnasaigh	Lord of Cenél Áeda na hEchtge c. 1533–after 1544	Succeeded by Ruaidhrí Gilla Dubh Ó Seachnasaigh
