= Sir Roger O'Shaughnessy, Irish Knight, Chief of the Name =

Irish Knight and Chief of the Name

Sir Roger O'Shaughnessy (Irish: Ruaidhrí Gilla Dubh Ó Seachnasaigh) (died 1569) was an Irish Knight and Chief of the Name.

The son of Sir Diarmaid Ó Seachnasaigh, Ruaidhrí was described by Sir Henry Sidney as "a very obedient and civil man, and most desirous to hold his lands directly of your majesty and to be delivered of the exactions of both the earls of Clanricarde and Thomond", whose earldoms lay north and south of O'Shaughnessy's small lordship.

The oppressions of Burke and O'Brien had led to his father consenting to the policy of surrender and regrant, by which means Sir Roger hoped to preserve his estates for his descendants. They were successfully confirmed in law by the Composition of Connacht of 1585. One of his last known male-line descendants, and Ó Seachnasaigh chief of the name, was Major-General William O'Shaughnessy (1673–1744). The last Ó Seachnasaigh chief, Joseph, died in 1783.

He married Lady Honora O'Brien, daughter of Murrough O'Brien, 1st Earl of Thomond.

Preceded by Diarmaid Ó Seachnasaigh	Lord of Cenél Áeda na hEchtge before 1567–1569	Succeeded by Diarmaid Riabach Ó Seachnasaigh
