= St Colman's =

St or St. Colman's may refer to:

== Schools ==
- St Colman's College, Claremorris, a boys secondary school in County Mayo, Ireland
- St Colman's College, Fermoy, a boys secondary school in County Cork, Ireland
- St Colman's College, Newry, a boys secondary school in County Down, Northern Ireland
- St Colman's High and Sixth Form College, Ballynahinch, County Down
- St Colman's Community College, Midleton, County Cork
- St. Colman's Catholic School, Turtle Creek, Pennsylvania, United States, a defunct Catholic school
- St. Colman's Primary School (disambiguation)

== Cathedrals and churches ==
- St Colman's Cathedral, Cobh, County Cork
- Cloyne Cathedral or St. Colman's Cathedral, Cloyne, County Cork
- St. Colman's Church, Claremorris, County Mayo
- St. Colman's Church, Gort, County Galway, Ireland
- St. Colman's Church, East Kingston, New York, United States

== Stadiums ==
- St Colman's Park, Cobh, a football stadium
