= Rahaly Castle =

Rahaly Castle is a 13th-century tower house, located approximately 3 miles east of Gort, County Galway. It is undergoing restoration.
