= Ballylooby =

Village in County Tipperary, Ireland

Ballylooby Béal Átha Lúbaigh
- Village
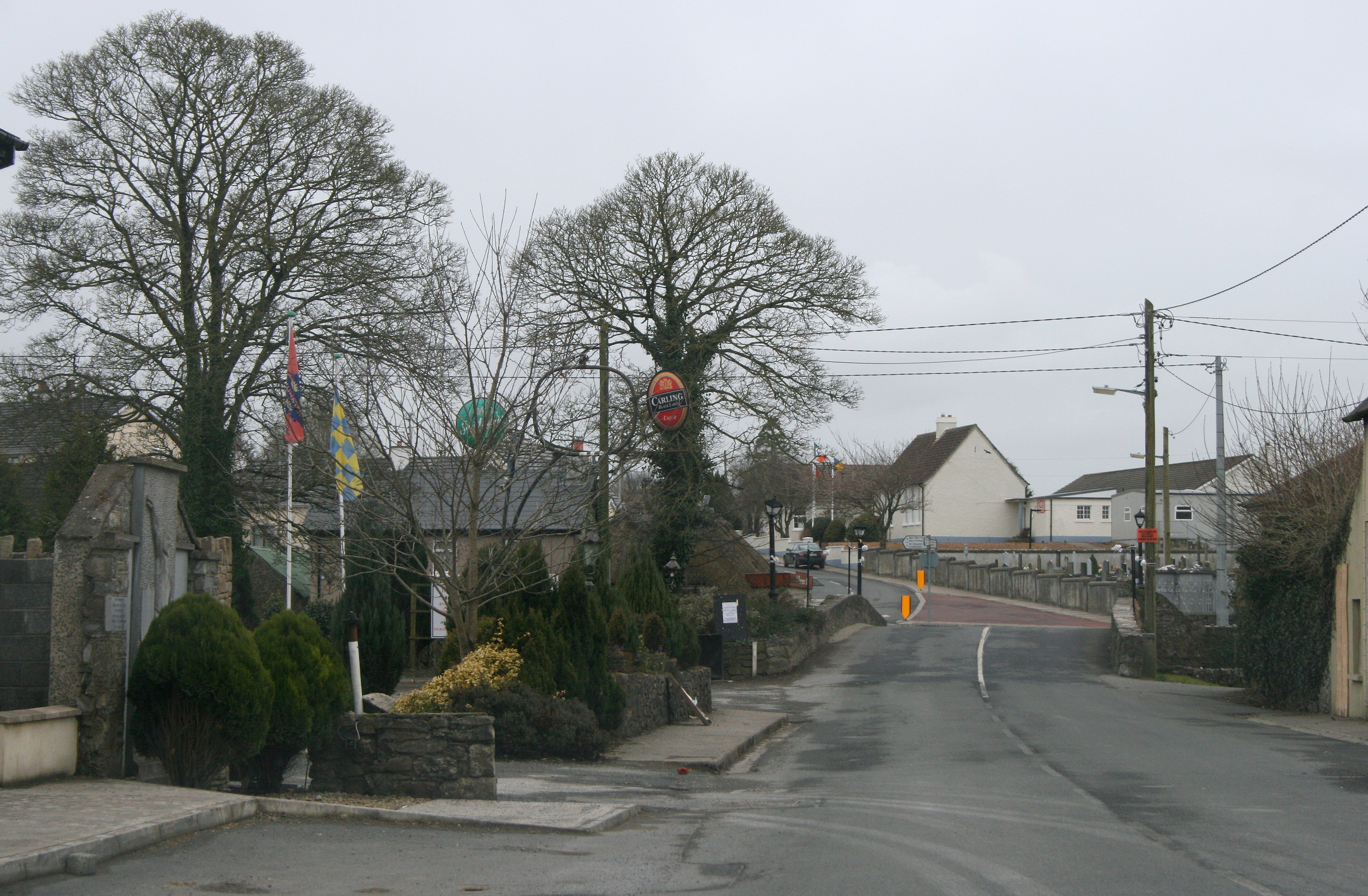

- Location in Ireland
- Coordinates: 52°19′38″N 7°59′02″W
- Country: Ireland
- Province: Munster
- County: Tipperary
- Time zone: UTC+0 (WET)
  - Summer (DST): UTC-1 (IST (WEST))
- Irish Grid Reference: R954207

Ballylooby (Irish: Béal Átha Lúbaigh, meaning 'mouth, or pass, of Looby's Ford') is a village in County Tipperary in Ireland. It is in the barony of Iffa and Offa West, and is also a parish in the Roman Catholic Diocese of Waterford and Lismore.

== Location ==
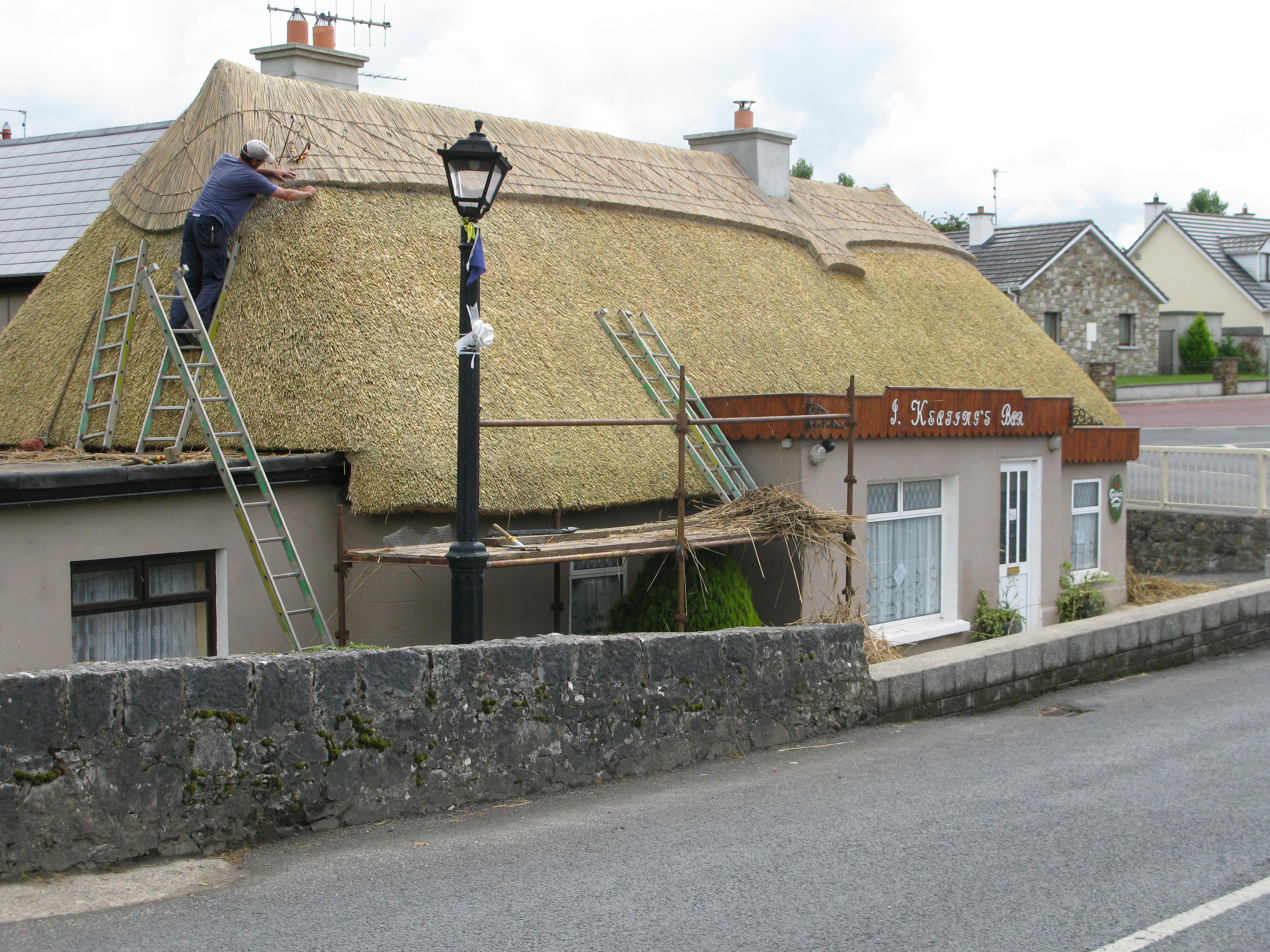
One of the village's oldest buildings: Keating's thatched pub

Ballylooby is on the R668 regional road between Cahir and Clogheen, approximately halfway between both towns. It is around 7 kilometres (4 mi) south west of Cahir.

The village links two townlands, Knockannapisha (NE) and Knockane (Puttoge) (SW), the boundary between them being the Thonnoge River.

== Transport ==
The village is served by Ringalink community transport and on Sundays only by the Bus Éireann Cork city to Cahir route 245. The nearest railway station is Cahir railway station, 9 km distant by road.

== Parish ==
=== Catholic Parish of Ballylooby and Tubrid ===
According to Patrick C. Power's Place-names of Decies, the modern parish includes the ancient parishes of Whitechurch, Tubrid and Tullaghorton, also known as Castlegrace, together with a section that had once formed the western part of Rochestown. It extends from the summit of the Galtees in the north to the summit of the Knockmealdown range in the south.

The parish has two churches, located at Ballylooby village and Duhill. The Catholic church is dedicated to the Blessed Virgin and St Kieran. Mass is also celebrated at the renovated church in Duhill.

== Village ==
=== Church of Our Lady and St. Kieran ===
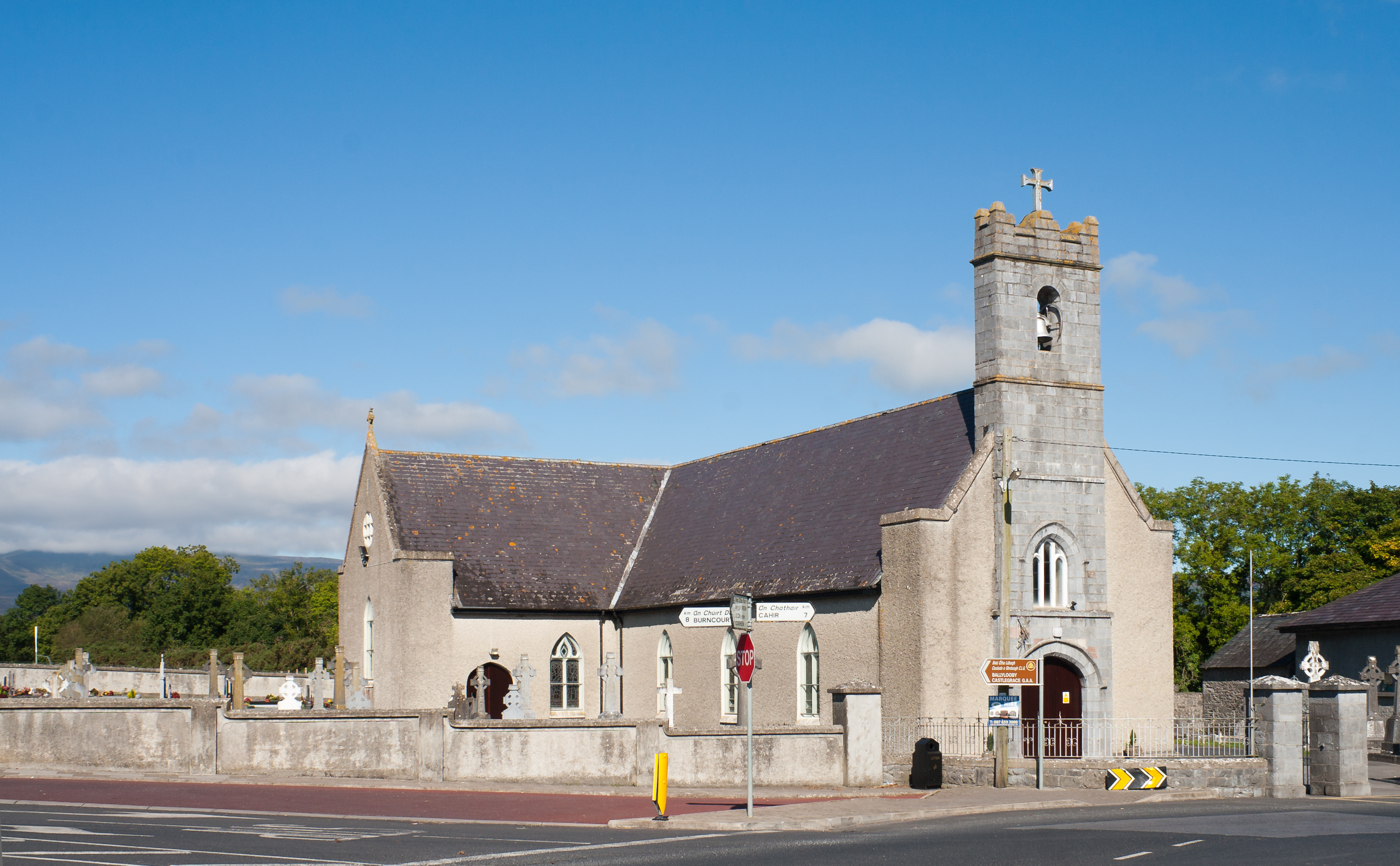
Our Lady's and St. Kieran's Church

The first church built in the village of Ballylooby ran East- West, on the site of the present structure. Its orientation was at right angles to the current building, constructed in 1813 by Rev. John Burke. The site of the old church was too small for the growing congregation, and so an extra twenty-six perches were bought from Patrick Burke. The land deal did not go smoothly and the latter erected a wall within the church and sought writs for trespass against those who crossed it. The heated disagreement lasted for several years but was eventually settled, and the wall removed in due course.

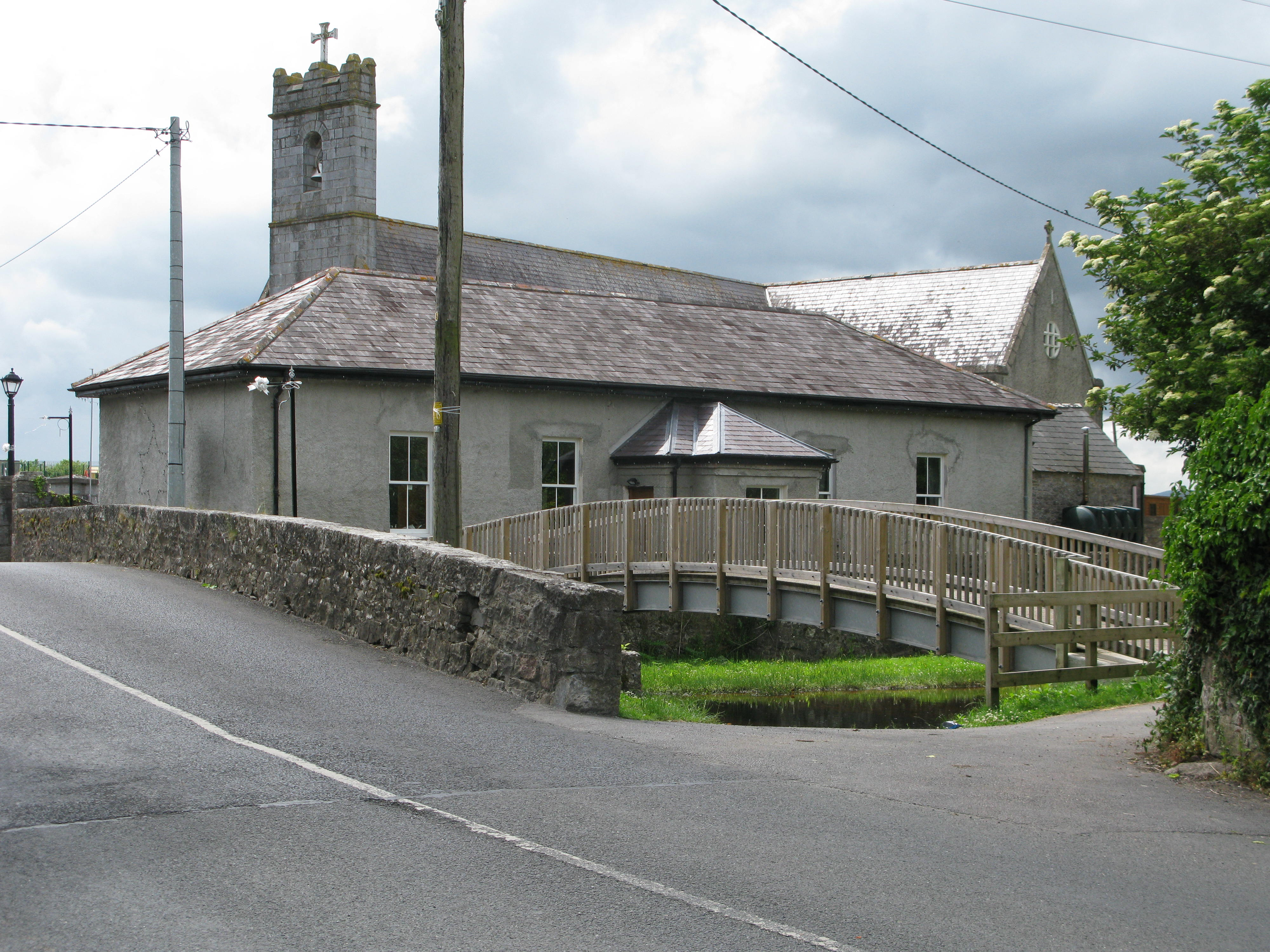
Former National Schools

St. Kieran's was remodelled (all but rebuilt), in 1927/1928 by the parish priest M. Walsh with the architect Rudolf Maximilian Butler. It was funded by local subscription, and many of the pews and stained glass windows bear the names of local families that sponsored them.

=== Schools ===
The present Parish Hall, adjacent to the church and bridge was once the village school, or more correctly schools. Both the boys and girls classes, though operating under one roof, were administered separately.

=== RIC Barracks ===
The Royal Irish Constabulary operated a barracks in the village for many years. It was sold to the local school-master, Michael Keating, by District Inspector Gilbert Potter in 1919 and so avoided damage by the Third Tipperary Brigade, during the Irish War of Independence.

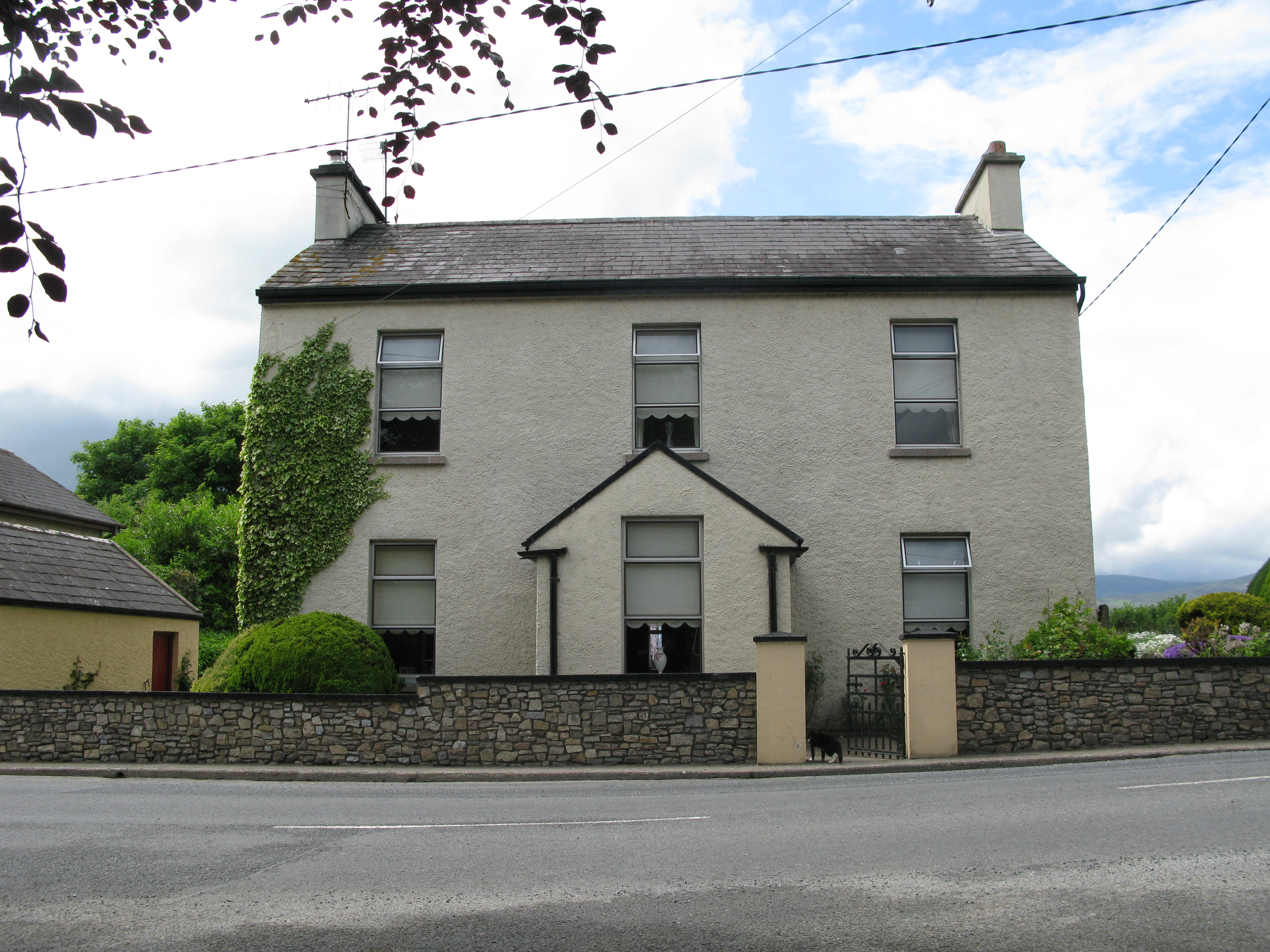
Former village RIC barracks

In December 1920, the barracks fleetingly became the focus of international attention when Daniel Francis Crowley and John Tangney, both ex-R.I.C Constables formerly stationed there, testified before the American Commission on Conditions in Ireland. They dramatically gave their reasons for quitting the force as the "brutality and lawlessness" of the contemporary administration, particularly the Black and Tans, as witnessed by them on their transfer from Ballylooby to Clogheen Barracks.

== Places of local interest ==
=== Duhill Church ===
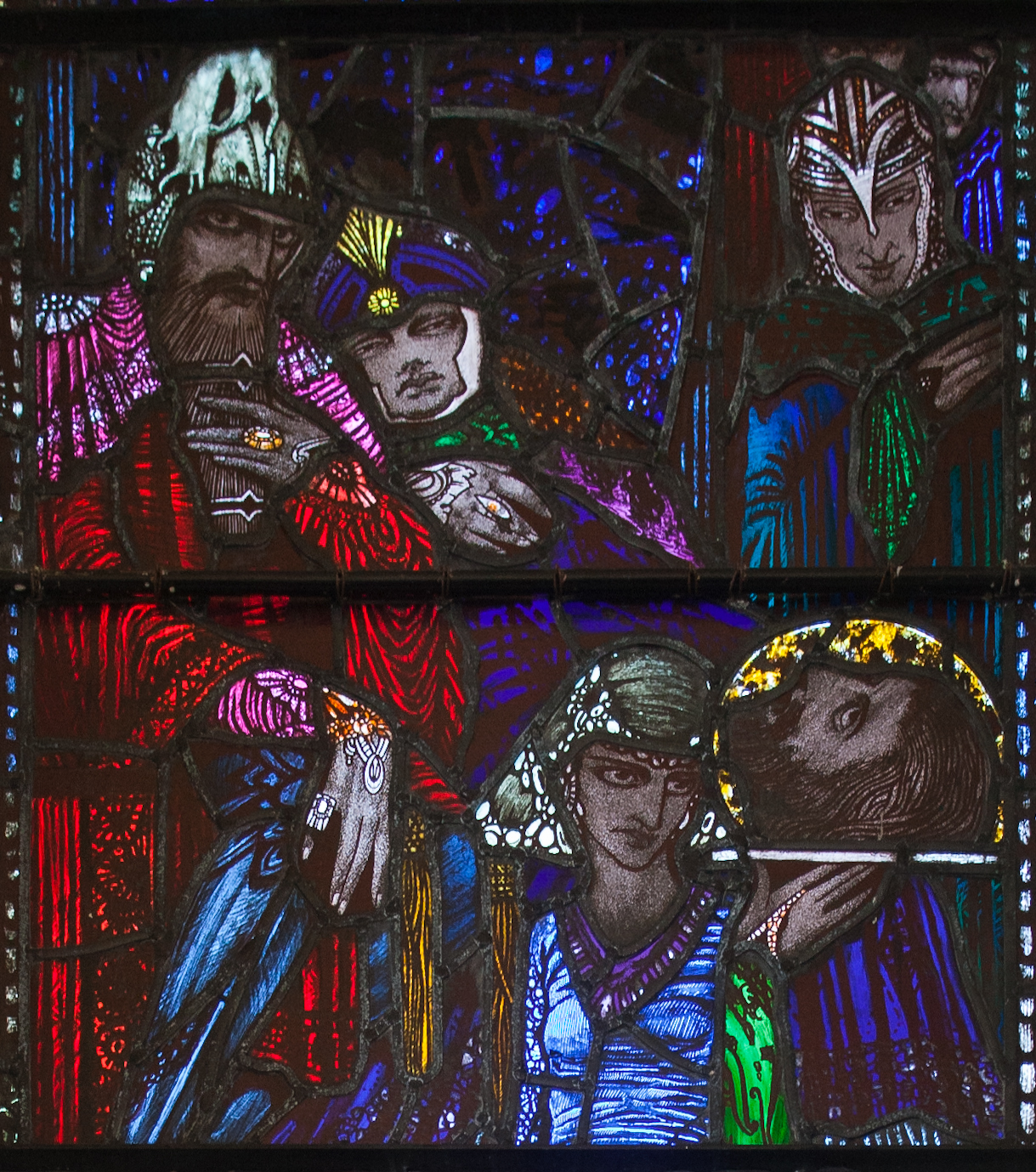
Detail of the Beheading of John the Baptist window by Harry Clarke

Duhill church, the building of which was commenced in 1829 and completed in 1830, is dedicated to St. John the Baptist (Decollation). It was renovated at a cost of £1 000 in 1929. The Parochial Registers begin with the year 1828.

Duhill church features two excellent examples of Harry Clarke's artistic achievements with stained glass. Created in 1925, they are located in the sanctuary, to the left and right of the altar, and depict Salome 'presenting' the head of John the Baptist to Herod and the Lourdes apparition. The Holy Family is a window executed by noted artist Hubert McGoldrick, and was also commissioned in 1925.

The mortuary chapel at Tubrid is the burial place of Seathrún Céitinn (Geoffrey Keating), a 17th-century Counter-Reformation priest of the parish and Gaelic historian of national repute. It is located just over 5 kilometres from Ballylooby.

== Sport ==
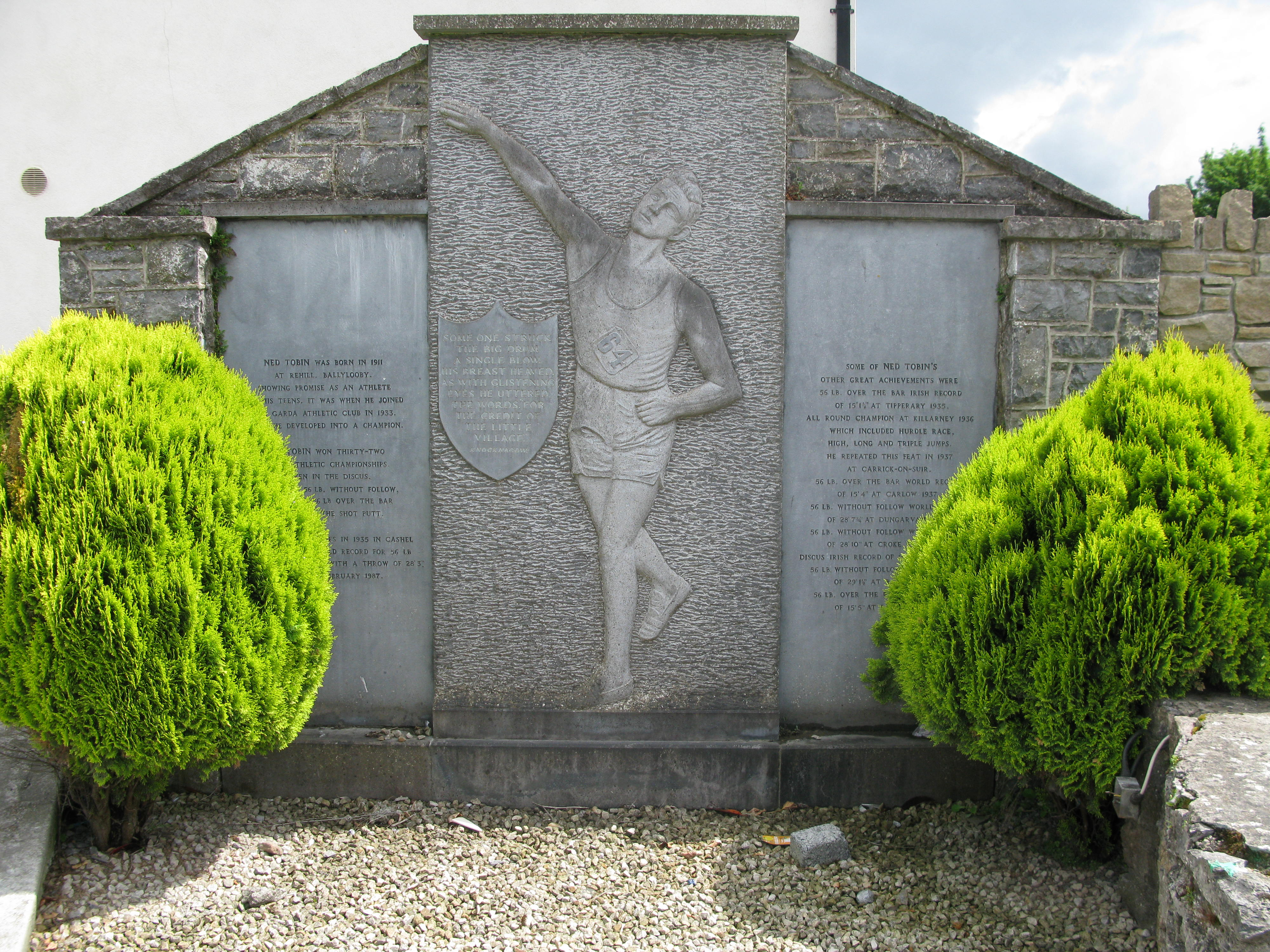
Ned Tobin monument

Ballylooby is of local notability primarily for the Ballylooby–Castlegrace Gaelic Athletic Association Club.
The GAA club competes at junior hurling level and intermediate Gaelic football level. Thomas Ryan, a native of the area, represented County Tipperary at the ill-fated match against Dublin on Bloody Sunday (1920).

Ryan was also a member of the IRA and fought in the Irish War of Independence. Tommy O'Connor was also a member of the Tipperary team at this time. In the centre of the village, there is a memorial to Ned Tobin, who achieved national fame as a track and field athlete, particularly in throwing the 56-pound weight "without follow". It is listed as S290, one of several protected structures in Ballylooby.

== Notable people ==
- Michael Tierney (1839–1908), sixth Bishop of Hartford, Connecticut, was born here.

== See also ==
- List of towns and villages in Ireland
