= Tommy Traynor =

Tommy Traynor may refer to:

- Tommy Traynor (Irish footballer) (1933–2006)
- Tommy Traynor (Scottish footballer) (1943–1993)

== See also ==
- Thomas Traynor, member of the Irish Republican Army
