= Frank Quinn (cricketer) =

Irish cricketer (1915–1996)

Personal information
- Full name: Francis Michael Quinn
- Born: 8 December 1915; Gort, Ireland
- Died: 30 May 1996 (aged 80); Dublin, Leinster, Ireland
- Batting: Right-handed
- Bowling: Right-arm medium
- Relatives: Gerry Quinn (brother); Kevin Quinn (brother)

Domestic team information
- Years: Team
- 1936–1948: Ireland

Career statistics
Competition	First-class
Matches	7
Runs scored	227
Batting average	16.21
100s/50s	1/–
Top score	140
Balls bowled	84
Wickets	0
Bowling average	–
5 wickets in innings	–
10 wickets in match	–
Best bowling	–
Catches/stumpings	6/–
- Source: Cricinfo, 23 October 2018

Francis Michael Quinn (8 December 1915 – 30 May 1996) was an Irish first-class cricketer.

Born at Gort in County Galway, Quinn was educated at Belvedere College in Dublin, before studying at University College Dublin. Playing club cricket for Phoenix in Dublin, Quinn made his debut in first-class cricket for Ireland against Scotland at Edinburgh in 1936. Prior to World War II, Quinn played three further first-class matches, two of which came against the touring Indians in 1936, and the touring New Zealanders in 1937. Following the war, he made a further three first-class appearances for Ireland, playing one match each against Scotland in 1946, 1947 and 1948. Across seven first-class matches, Quinn scored 227 runs at an average of 16.21, with a high score of 140. This came against Scotland at Grennock in 1946. Outside of cricket he worked as an accountant. Quinn died at Dublin in May 1996. Two of his brothers, Gerry Quinn and Kevin Quinn, both played cricket and international rugby union for Ireland.
