= Eleanor Howard, Countess of Wicklow =

Irish politician and architect (1914–1997)

Eleanor Howard

Senator
- In office 21 April 1948 – 14 August 1951
- Constituency: Nominated by the Taoiseach

Personal details
- Born: Eleanor Grace Butler; 7 September 1914 Dublin, Ireland
- Died: 21 February 1997 (aged 82) Blackrock, Dublin, Ireland
- Party: Labour Party
- Spouse: William Howard
- Parent: Rudolf Maximilian Butler (father)
- Education: University College Dublin

Eleanor Howard, Countess of Wicklow (née Butler; 7 September 1914 – 21 February 1997) was an Irish Labour Party politician and architect.

== Background ==
Eleanor Butler was born on 7 September 1914, the daughter of Rudolf Maximilian Butler, who was the first Professor of Architecture in University College Dublin. She had a polio attack at age six. Shortly after achieving a bachelor's degree in architecture from University College Dublin at age 24 in 1938, had a riding accident that required a year of care in St Vincent's Hospital. Both incidents almost left her without the ability to walk. On the second occasion, she resolved that if she kept her ability to walk that she would try to lead a life of service to others. Her father's influence also pushed her towards public life; early in her life, despite being a Protestant family, he pushed her to base her morality on Catholic social teaching such as social justice. Later in life she converted to Roman Catholicism, as well as marrying a convert to Catholicism.

== Political career ==
She became a Labour member of Dublin Corporation, and was chosen by the party in 1945 to visit Britain to investigate modern British housing. She ran as a Labour candidate for the Dáil in 1948, before she was nominated by the Taoiseach to Seanad Éireann in April 1948, where she served until 1951. On 2 September 1959 she married William Howard, 8th Earl of Wicklow, cementing a thirteen-year long courtship. They had no children.

Lady Wicklow was attached to the Moral Re-Armament movement, and in the 1970s became deeply concerned about The Troubles in Northern Ireland. Under her leadership, 20 women's organisations in the Republic of Ireland formed together to lobby on behalf of peace in Northern Ireland, eventually creating groups such as the Southern Movement for Peace and Co-operation North: the Ireland Fund of America.
