= Gerry Quinn (sportsman, born 1917) =

Irish cricketer and rugby union player

Personal information
- Full name: Gerard Joseph Quinn
- Born: 10 September 1917; Gort, Ireland
- Died: 20 November 1968 (aged 51); Dublin, Leinster, Ireland
- Batting: Right-handed
- Bowling: Right-arm unknown style
- Relatives: Frank Quinn (brother); Kevin Quinn (brother)

Domestic team information
- Years: Team
- 1937: Ireland

Career statistics
Competition	First-class
Matches	1
Runs scored	14
Batting average	7.00
100s/50s	–/–
Top score	12
Balls bowled	0
Wickets	–
Bowling average	–
5 wickets in innings	–
10 wickets in match	–
Best bowling	–
Catches/stumpings	1/–
- Source: Cricinfo, 23 October 2018

Gerry Joseph Quinn (10 September 1917 – 20 November 1968) was an Irish first-class cricketer and rugby union international.

Born at Gort in County Galway, Quinn was educated at Belvedere College in Dublin, before studying law at University College Dublin. Playing club cricket for Phoenix in Dublin, Quinn made a single appearance in first-class cricket for Ireland against the English Minor Counties cricket team in 1937 at Observatory Lane, Dublin. Batting twice in the match, Quinn was dismissed for 12 runs by Henry Butterworth in Ireland's first-innings, while in their second-innings he was dismissed for 2 runs by the same bowler. A member of the Old Belvedere rugby union team, he played twice for Ireland in the 1945–46 Victory International matches, though these matches were not recognised as official capped matches until 2023. Outside of sport, Quinn had a successful career as a solicitor. He died while playing tennis with Michael Dargan and Karl Mullen in Dublin in November 1968. Two of his brothers, Frank Quinn and Kevin Quinn, both played cricket for Ireland; additionally, Kevin also played international rugby union for Ireland.
