= Thomas Laughnan =

- Born: August 1824; Gort, County Galway
- Died: 23 July 1864 (aged 39-40); County Galway
- Military career
- Allegiance: United Kingdom
- Branch: Bengal Army
- Rank: Gunner
- Units: Bengal Artillery
- Conflicts: Indian Mutiny
- Awards: Victoria Cross

Thomas Laughnan VC (August 1824 – 23 July 1864) was an Irish recipient of the Victoria Cross, the highest and most prestigious award for gallantry in the face of the enemy that can be awarded to British and Commonwealth forces.

== Details ==
He was approximately 33 years old, and a Gunner in the Bengal Artillery, Bengal Army during the Indian Mutiny when the following deeds took place at the Relief of Lucknow for which he was awarded the VC.

Elected respectively, under the 13th clause of the Royal Warrant of the 29th of January, 1856, by the Officers and non-commissioned officers generally, and by the private soldiers of each troop or battery, for conspicuous gallantry at the relief of Lucknow, from the 14th to the 22nd of November, 1857.

He died in County Galway on 23 July 1864.

== The medal ==
His Victoria Cross is displayed at the Royal Artillery Museum, Woolwich, London.
