= Rudolf Maximilian Butler =

Irish architectural historian, academic, journalist and architect

- Born: 30 September 1872; Dublin
- Died: 3 February 1943 (aged 70); Dublin
- Other names: R.M. Butler
- Occupations: Architect; academic; journalist; architect
- Known for: Professor of Architecture at University College, Dublin, Editor of the Irish Builder, Architect of many Catholic churches, Founder of the AAI

Rudolf Maximilian Butler, RIAI, FRIBA, RSAI, RHA, RIA, (30 September 1872 – 3 February 1943) was a well-known Irish Roman Catholic ecclesiastical architectural historian, academic, journalist, and architect of Dublin active, throughout late-nineteenth-century to mid-twentieth-century Ireland. He resided and worked at 23 Kildare Street, Dublin until he designed a new residence for himself at 73, Ailesbury Road. He was brought up a Moravian and may have remained in that faith throughout his life, however, he designed all of his churches for the Roman Catholic Church, particularly for the Passionist Fathers. He was a founding member of the AAI in 1896, editor of the Irish Builder from 1899 to 1935, and professor of architecture at University College, Dublin.

The RM Butler Architect Collection which covers both his work and his research into James Gandon is held by the library of University College Cork.

In 1911, he married Annie Gibbons, a catholic; their son and three daughters were brought up as catholics. He died on 3 February 1943 in Dublin. His practice, R. M. Butler & Co., was continued by his son, John Geoffrey Butler, and his daughter Eleanor Butler.

== Works ==
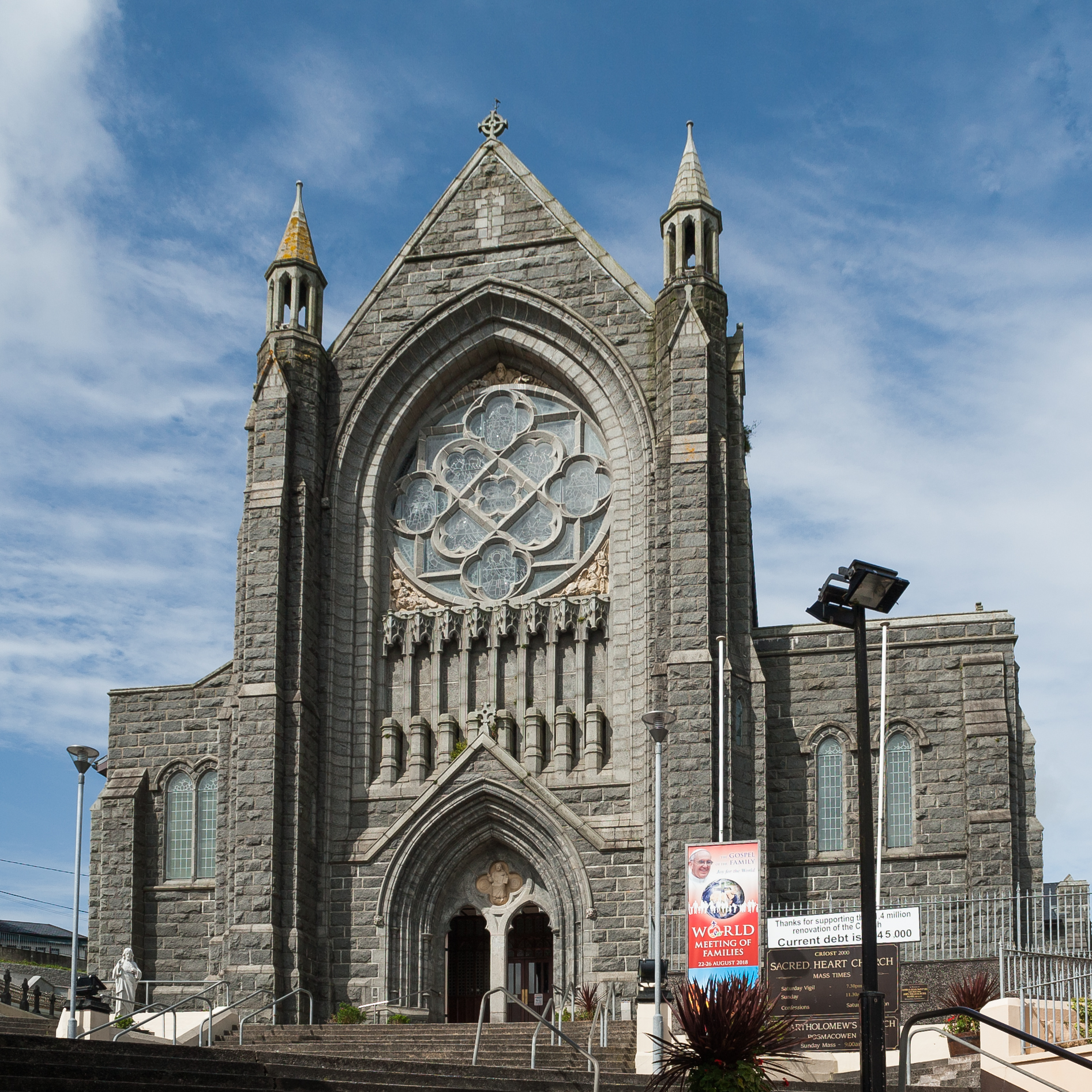
Sacred Heart Church in Castletownbere

- 1907: Sacred Heart Church in Castletownbere
- 1910: St. Colman's Church in Inishbofin, County Galway
- 1911: St. Colman's Church in Claremorris, County Mayo
- 1920: His residence at 73 Ailesbury Road.
- 1923–1926: Remodeled St. Dympna’s Roman Catholic Church, Tedavnet, County Monaghan (Ref. 41400604)
- 1922–1923: St Michael’s Church, Annyalla, Co Monaghan: completion of a commission of William A Scott.
- 1923–1926: St. Joseph's Church, Letterfrack
- 1924–1925: Rebuilt St. Mary's Roman Catholic Church, Threemilehouse, County Monaghan.
- 1927: Remodeling and extension of Church of Our Lady and St. Kieran, Ballylooby
