= Thomas Ryan (Irish Army officer) =

Thomas (Tommy) Ryan (1897–1980) was an Irish republican and Gaelic footballer. He was born in Tubrid, County Tipperary, and fought during the Irish War of Independence attached to the 6th (after Dec. 1920 redesignated as 5th) Battalion, (Cahir), Third Tipperary Brigade, I.R.A.

Tommy Ryan was part of the Tipperary Gaelic football team which played against Dublin in Croke Park on 21 November 1920. This day has become known as Bloody Sunday as the Royal Irish Constabulary (RIC) invaded the pitch and killed 13 attendees and one player as a reprisal for the assassination of the Cairo Gang. After this date Ryan went on the run and joined Seán Hogan's number 2 flying column. After the Anglo-Irish Treaty, he sided with the Government forces and rose to the rank of lieutenant colonel in the Irish Defence Forces. He is buried in Deansgrange Cemetery Blackrock.

== Sources ==
- Ryan, Thomas, Lt. Col.: One Man's Flying Column : Tipperary Historical Journal: pub. County Tipperary Historical Society :1991
- Ryan, Thomas, Lt. Col.: One Man's Flying Column 2 : Tipperary Historical Journal: pub. County Tipperary Historical Society :1992
- Ryan, Thomas, Lt. Col.: One Man's Flying Column : Tipperary Historical Journal: pub. County Tipperary Historical Society :1991
