= Gilbert Potter =

Irish police officer

Gilbert Norman Potter
- District Inspector C.M (sic) Potter; Royal Irish Constabulary, reported by Dublin Castle to have run into an ambush between Clougheen (sic) and Cahir last week. Notice that appeared in the Freeman's Journal, Wednesday, 27 April 1921, the evening on which Potter was killed.
- Other name: "Chum"
- Occupations: District inspector, Royal Irish Constabulary

Gilbert Norman Potter (10 July 1878 – 27 April 1921) was a district inspector of the Royal Irish Constabulary. He was born in Dromahair, County Leitrim, a son of Rev. Joseph Potter, Church of Ireland Rector of Drumlease Parish, and Mrs. Jane Potter. He was stationed at Cahir, County Tipperary, during the Irish War of Independence. In April 1921 he was captured and executed by the Irish Republican Army in reprisal for the British execution of Thomas Traynor, an Irish republican.

== Career ==
Potter received his commission as District Inspector on 27 April 1901 having completed his cadetship at the Depot, Phoenix Park, Dublin. His first assignment was to Castlepollard, County Westmeath. During the 1909 ITGWU strike in Cork, he was temporarily posted there from Dublin and was also involved in policing the 14 August marches in Portadown. Having had charge of No. 4 Company at the Depot, he was assigned to Cahir in 1912.

== Capture by the IRA ==
=== Hyland's Cross Ambush ===
On 23 April 1921 District Inspector Potter was captured by the 3rd (South) Tipperary Brigade, IRA, following the Hyland's Cross Ambush. This occurred near Curraghcloney, close to the village of Ballylooby. The ambush party was initially made up of a combination of the 1st and 2nd Flying Columns 3rd Tipperary Brigade. This was the largest force assembled to date by the Tipperary IRA in anticipation of a major battle. However, the convoy of military lorries that was expected never materialised. Dan Breen and Con Moloney returned to battalion headquarters, while Seán Hogan's Column withdrew northwards in the direction of the Galtee Mountains.

As Dinny Lacey's (No.1) Column prepared to leave towards the south, a small party of British soldiers accompanying two horse-drawn carts unexpectedly approached from Clogheen and were immediately fired upon. Amid some confusion Lacey's scattered men withdrew southwards towards the Knockmealdown Mountains. One British soldier, Frank Edward Conday, was fatally wounded and two others from the relieving party were wounded. Reports that army lorries were burned during the exchange may have been abandoned by the relieving soldiers sent from Clogheen.

By chance, Potter, who was returning by car from police duties at Ballyporeen, drove into a section of the withdrawing No.1 Column. Although in mufti, he was recognised by one of the IRA Volunteers and taken prisoner. As part of a new strategy, he was held as a hostage for the safe release of Thomas Traynor, an IRA volunteer (and father of ten young children), then under sentence of death at Mountjoy Jail. The I.R.A. offered to release Potter in exchange for Traynor's release. Traynor was executed. Traynor has since been honoured by the Irish state as one of "The Forgotten Ten".

=== Kept as hostage and executed ===
The Column, under sporadic fire from soldiers alerted at the nearby Clogheen barracks, followed the contours of the mountains to the village of Newcastle. Losing their pursuers, they stayed for a period of time at the townland of Glasha. Here Potter was detained in an out-building of a farm which was regularly used by the IRA as a safe-house. From there the party was guided into the Nire Valley by a contingent of local Waterford Volunteers and on to the Comeragh Mountains.

Accounts from Rathgormack, County Waterford suggest he was kept for at least one night at a nearby Ringfort before being taken down the hill to a field then owned by Power's of Munsboro, where he met his ultimate fate. At 7p.m., on 27 April, following news of Traynor's execution by hanging, he was shot to death, and hastily buried in a shallow grave on the banks of the Clodagh River. A diary he kept during his period of captivity and some personal effects and farewell letters (copies of which transcribed below), were returned anonymously to his wife. It was the first confirmation she had that he had been killed. The artifacts were later lost when his son's ship was torpedoed in 1942, during the Second World War.

== Military retaliation ==
Three weeks after Potter's death, on 18 May, the following notice of officially sanctioned military reprisals appeared in local newspapers:

Official Reprisals in South Tipperary
14 Homes Destroyed
We are requested to publish the following:

- (1) The houses of the following persons were destroyed on Friday 13th May and Saturday 14th.
  Cahir District
  (1) Mrs. T. O'Gorman, Burncourt Castle (2) Mrs Tobin, Tincurry House (3) Edmund Mulcahy, Coolagarranvoe (4) Pat McCarthy, Drumlummin
  (5) James Slattery, Killbeg (6) Robert Keating, Ballylooby
  Tipperary District
  (7) Bryan Shanahan, Grantstown (8) J. Dwyer Ballinavasin (9) J. Barry, Cross of Donohill (10) Patrick Corbett, Donohill
  Cashel District
  (11) Edmond Riley, Coolanga (12) J. Ryan, Turrabeen (13) O'Keeffe, Glenough (14) John Grogan, Shanballyduff
  The contents of the following person was destroyed on Friday 13th May
  James Taylor, Cashel.
- (2) The destructions were ordered by Colonel Commandant N.J.G. Cameron CB, CMG, ADC Commanding 16th Infantry Brigade and Military Governor on the grounds that the persons concerned are active supporters of armed rebels and especially of the 3rd Tipperary Brigade of the Irish Republican Army and that they reside in the area and that the 3rd Tipperary Brigade has admitted responsibility for the brutal murder of District Inspector G.N. Potter R.I.C. (D.I. of Cahir) on or about 20 April 1921. [sic]
- (3) Before the work of destruction commenced, Notice "B" was served on the owner of each house telling him that his property was going to be destroyed and the reason and giving him one hour in which to clear out valuables and foodstuffs, hay and corn, but not furniture.

.

== Truce and re-interment ==
Are we going to choose in the next onward march of this nation the weapons which will give us dead in our country- the Crompton-Smiths (sic) of England and the Potters of Ireland; or, are we going to take our own resources and grow to manhood, in friendliness and with some chance of avoiding that polarisation of mind and polarisation in antagonisms with the English people that we have been forced into at the present time?

— Richard Mulcahy – Dáil debates

During the Truce, by arrangement through specially appointed Liaison Officers, Potter's body was disinterred by the IRA and conveyed to Clonmel where it was returned to his widow, Lilias. Two days later he was brought to Cahir and buried with full military honours at the Church of Ireland cemetery at Kilcommon, 4 kilometres south of the town. The funeral, presided over by Bishop Miller of Waterford, and attended by the Band of the Lincolnshire Regiment, the locally stationed Royal Field Artillery and officers and men of the R.I.C. took place in the afternoon of Tue. 30 August 1921.

In heated debates in the Dáil, following the signing of the Treaty, the names of the dead were invoked by both sides to justify their respective positions. Richard Mulcahy made the appeal shown.

== Family ==
Lilias and the four children (Hilda, Georgina, Gilbert Charles, and Freddie) soon after had a stormy crossing of the Irish Sea by cattle boat before settling in Tunbridge Wells, Kent, England. For some time, the sale of the damaged motor car which realised £50, £25 back-pay due her husband, an insurance policy to the value of £300 and some sundry personal effects were all that came to Lily. There was a modest pension on the basis of her husband's death, but the family were in dire financial circumstances. Some time later, a compensation award of £12,000 was made by the authorities for the benefit of Potter's dependents. Lilias Potter died at Broadstairs in 1926, and within a short period two of the children also died. The two surviving children, Hilda and Gilbert Charles, lived for some time with their uncle in Liverpool and with various other relations during holidays from school.

Gilbert Charles Potter joined the Royal Navy. He survived when his ship was torpedoed during the Second World War and lived to see his daughter get married. While serving in the Navy, he met an Irish sailor named Traynor, whose father, according to his service record, had been executed by the British during the Irish War of Independence. Gilbert believed him to be a son of the man with the same surname for whose execution his father had been shot by the IRA in retaliation. In the mid-1960s, Potter returned to Cahir. This was his first visit back to Ireland. He reportedly met with Dan Breen in a County Wicklow nursing home. Breen was one of the IRA leaders closely involved in his father's detention and the abortive prisoner exchange. They spent a strained period of time discussing contemporary affairs as well as the events of forty-five years previous. Gilbert was surprised but happy to learn from many locals in the Cahir area across the political spectrum that his father had been held in high regard as a kindly and honourable man, notwithstanding his participation on the 'wrong side' of the war.

== Final letters ==
During Potter's period of captivity, he was permitted to write a number of letters to his family. They did reach their intended recipients, but through whom they were sent and when precisely they arrived remains unclear.

WILL------------ 27th April 1921
I leave to my darling and devoted wife Lily everything I possess.---------------Lilias Potter
I wish her to give my wrist watch to our sweet little son Charles---He has worn it often---My wedding ring also to my dearest wife who gave it to me---I have little to leave, Lily, we had everything in common. My bureau that you gave me—to Hilda our dear angel first born. The little travelling clock to Georgie. My polo cup to your dear [illeg.] of a small success I had in life before meeting you. (I had nothing to bring you, you gave all) You did what no one ever did for me before, you gave me a pure and devoted love --- a home and our children--- You tried in every way to help me and save me but we know there is only One who can do that perfectly. He will let us meet agan ---- My walking sticks are for you --- one for Charles, Give Freddy something --- Will you write again to [Illeg] Boyle for the ~~cups~~ silver forks and spoons Golf clubs, balls tennis racket to you Lily --- I cannot find out when I am to be released. I am informed the decision rests with the Dal Eirann. I don't know if you can approach any person connected with it --- I was told a question of exchange might be raised, I wonder does the Government care enough about one who has been their servant for over 20 years to make an effort in my direction? Dal Eirann should be able to find out that I never injured an Irishman and lived always on good terms with the Irish, being born & having lived all my life In Ireland. [ Illeg] claim to have the right to -My love to all our friends in Cahir --- and to the Bishop and May and their family in [ Illeg] My love to Corre? & John and Aunt Sophie? To Percy & Lilias – To Lyndon Mabel and their boys, To Wilkie --- God bless them all --- Remember me to [ Illeg] old Bob Live on at Apsley House dear if you can, if it is God's will --- ask him --- Remember me to Mr. Ford & his family --- to [ Ileg] --- the Dennys --- To my Hd. Constable & men--- our rector ---

~~4th~~ ~~5th~~ 5th Day of Captivity --- With I.R.A.. 26th April 192#
Dear Bishop, I hope you can do something to help Lily in this time of distress for her. I have written her a letter and she may have received it as the IRA officer told me it was posted ---Pals in Ireland have regard for my wife who is Irish more so than I am, as regards her family having held land in the country ---I cannot now write my personal feelings to you --- [ Illeg.] --- The I.R.A treat me well and are kind hearted --- comfort my dear Lily. How awful that I should have brought her this trouble ---If you see Lily soon tell her that her goodness to me and devoted love are felt by me and are a treasure in my affliction ---I pray for her and the prayers are heard. Yours affect’ly, Gilbert.

27 April 1921.
Dearest Wife I hope you had news of me through my letter ---The IRA say you can send me a parcel if you take steps that the method of sending it is not known & kept secret ---Perhaps you could give a parcel to Mrs, Cleary which she could keep at Spelmans[?] until it is called for. I want ---
(1) Clean long drawers (2) Clean long cotton vest (3) Clean cotton shirt (4) pair socks (5) big boots [Illeg] inside with insoles --- the K would suit best (6) Waterproof coat (7) Safety razor with two dozen new blades (8) Shaving brush, soap, a small sponge (9) Tooth brush
If you put the lot in cloth haversack like the RIC have I could carry it --- If impossible to send don’t be troubled as the people I meet are really kind and could supply everything except a safety razor --- Now darling wife God will help us. My love to you Hilda, Georgie, Charles and Freddie --- Could you send me a pound? Your husband, Gilbert

27 April 1921
I request those in authority with IRA to send to my wife my note book which contains messages for her and my will. There are, I am sure, humane leaders who will pity a wife who is Irish, as I am also. G.N. Potter

Enclosed in box for my wife
Wrist watch Gold ring Cigarette holder Silver match box Set of keys Cigarette case Letter for her and the Bishop of Waterford

== Sources and notes ==
=== Bibliography ===
- Goulden Papers: Manuscripts Collection: Trinity College, Dublin
- Herlihy, Jim; The Royal Irish Constabulary A complete alphabetical list of officers and men, 1816–1922; Four Courts; Press; 2005 : ISBN 1-85182-502-9
- Breen D. My Fight for Irish Freedom Talbot Press (1924) translate in French
- Tobin, Peter: Witness Statement (W.S. 1,223): Bureau of Military History Copy accessed at National Archives of Ireland, Dublin
- Desmond, Michael : Witness Statement (W.S. 1,338): p. 10
- Abbott, Richard: Police Casualties in Ireland 1919–1922: Mercier Press: 2000: ISBN 1-85635-314-1
- O'Dwyer, Kate: The Third Tipperary Brigade: its guerilla campaign (1919–1921): in Tipperary Historical Journal (1997), pp. 65–73
- Younger, Carlton: Ireland's Civil War: 3rd Impression: Fontana Collins: Great Britain: 1979

=== On-line sources ===
Dáil Éireann – Volume 3–22 December 1921 DEBATE ON TREATY
New York Times contemporary report of Potter's disappearance.

=== Additional notes ===
- D.I. Potter's headstone at Kilcommon is located towards the end of the path on the right hand side.
  Gilbert Norman Potter, D.I. R.I.C., Dearly Loved, Killed In Ireland, April 27, 1921, Aged 42, Faithful Unto Death
  Below which his son is also acknowledged:
  Gilbert Charles Potter, R.N. D.S.C, 1916–1975.
- In his letter to Breen of 30 September 1966, Tom O'Connor, in 1921 the Captain of E Company, 6th? Battalion, 3rd Tipp. Brigade IRA states :

We were all sorry for Potter who seemed to be a very 'good' man. He did his best to get the Tans out of Cahir, he got a certificate from the Medical Officer in Cahir to state the barracks was not suitable. This man is there yet to prove it, Doctor Michael (illeg.), The Mall, Cahir.

- Transcript of the letter received by Lilias Potter on 9 May. It was typed and enclosed in an unstamped envelope.

D.I. Potter, having been legally tried and convicted, was sentenced to death, which sentence was duly carried out on Wed. 27th April." (Signed O.C.)

- The apparent meeting of Charles Potter and Thomas Traynor's son was related by Dan Breen to Carlton Younger for his book. (see bibliography) . Younger dismissed it: "a nice storey, but an old man's fancy, it appears." (p 146). However the event is recalled in the correspondence between Charles Potter and J. R. Goulden in the 1960s, and was almost certainly told to Breen during his discussion with Charles at the Kilcroney nursing home in 1966 prior to his interview with Younger.
