= William Howard, 8th Earl of Wicklow =

British peer

William Howard
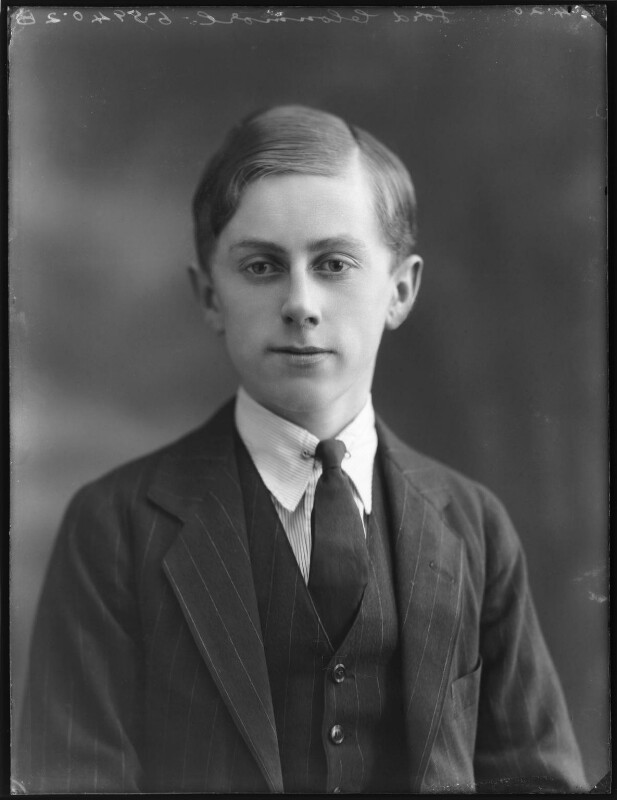
- Howard in 1920
- Born: 30 October 1902
- Died: 8 February 1978 (aged 75)
- Education: Merton College, Oxford
- Spouse: Eleanor Butler (m. 1959)
- Father: Ralph Howard
- Relatives: James Hamilton (grandfather)
- Military career
- Rank: Captain
- Unit: Royal Fusiliers
- Conflicts: World War II

William Cecil James Philip John Paul Howard, 8th Earl of Wicklow (30 October 1902 – 8 February 1978), styled Lord Clonmore until 1946, was an Anglo-Irish peer.

== Biography ==
He was the only child of Ralph Howard, 7th Earl of Wicklow and the Countess of Wicklow, formerly Lady Gladys Mary Hamilton. His maternal grandparents were the 2nd Duke of Abercorn and Lady Mary Anna Curzon-Howe.

He was known as Lord Clonmore until succeeding to the Earldom in 1946.

He was first educated at Wixenford, from where he passed the examination to enter the Royal Naval College, Osborne, in May 1916. However, in the event he proceeded to Eton College, and in 1921 he matriculated at Merton College, Oxford. He was then ordained a deacon and priest of the Church of England. Among his Oxford associates were Glyn Simon, Evelyn Waugh, and John Betjeman. He was part of the Hypocrites' Club. He worked for the Magdalen Mission at St Mary's Church in Somers Town. Having been a zealous Anglo-Catholic, he converted to Roman Catholicism in 1932, and thereafter lived as a layman. He was disinherited by his father and banished from the family seat in Ireland on Sundays because he was thought to be an embarrassment on account of his attending Mass with the servants, who were also Roman Catholics. During the Second World War he was commissioned into the Royal Fusiliers and rose to the rank of Captain.

In 1946 he succeeded his father as Earl of Wicklow. In the 1950s he wrote on religious subjects and was also active as a translator. On 2 September 1959, he married Eleanor Butler, an architect who had been a member of Seanad Éireann between 1948 and 1951. They had no children. When he died in 1978 the titles passed to his first cousin, Cecil Aylmar Howard, the ninth earl. When the ninth earl died in 1983, the titles became extinct.

== Publications ==
- Pierre Barbet, The corporal passion of Jesus Christ tr. the Earl of Wicklow (Dublin: Clonmore & Reynolds, 1950, 1954, 1955)
- The Earl of Wicklow, More about Dom Marmion: a study of his writings together with a chapter from an unpublished work and a biographical sketch (Dublin: Clonmore & Reynolds; London: Burns, Oates, & Washbourne, 1950)
- The Earl of Wicklow, ed., The Glory of Mary (In Honour of the Assumption) with a foreword by Wicklow (Dublin: Clonmore & Reynolds, 1952)
- The [8th] earl of Wicklow [W.C.J.P.J.P. Howard], ‘The monastic revival in the Anglican Communion’, Studies: An Irish Quarterly Review (Winter 1953), 420–32.
- R. P. H. Perroy, The mass explained to children, tr. the Earl of Wicklow (Dublin: Clonmore & Reynolds, 1956)
- The Earl of Wicklow, Fireside Fusilier with an introduction by Evelyn Waugh (Dublin: Clonmore & Reynolds; London: Hollis & Carter, 1958; Derby: Citadel Press, 1970)
- The Earl of Wicklow, ed., Rome is home: the experience of converts with a preface by Edward Charles Rich (Dublin: Clonmore & Reynolds, 1959)

Peerage of Ireland
Preceded by Ralph Howard	Earl of Wicklow; 1946–1978	Succeeded by Cecil Aylmar Howard
