= Shanaglish =

Village in County Galway, Ireland

Shanaglish Sean Eaglais
- Village
- Location in Ireland
- Coordinates: 53.0121°N 8.8392°W
- Country: Ireland
- Province: Connacht
- County: County Galway
- Irish Grid Reference: M451019

Shanaglish is a village in the parish of Beagh in the south of County Galway, Ireland, close to the border with County Clare. The name Shanaglish comes from the Gaelic 'Sean Eaglais', meaning 'old church'. The village was formerly in the parish of St Anne's and there is now a Roman Catholic church dedicated to St Anne.

Ardamullivan Castle is located nearby.

== Notable residents ==
The Irish nationalist brothers, Patrick and Harry Loughnane, farmed in Shanaglish before they were kidnapped and executed by the Auxiliaries in November 1920.

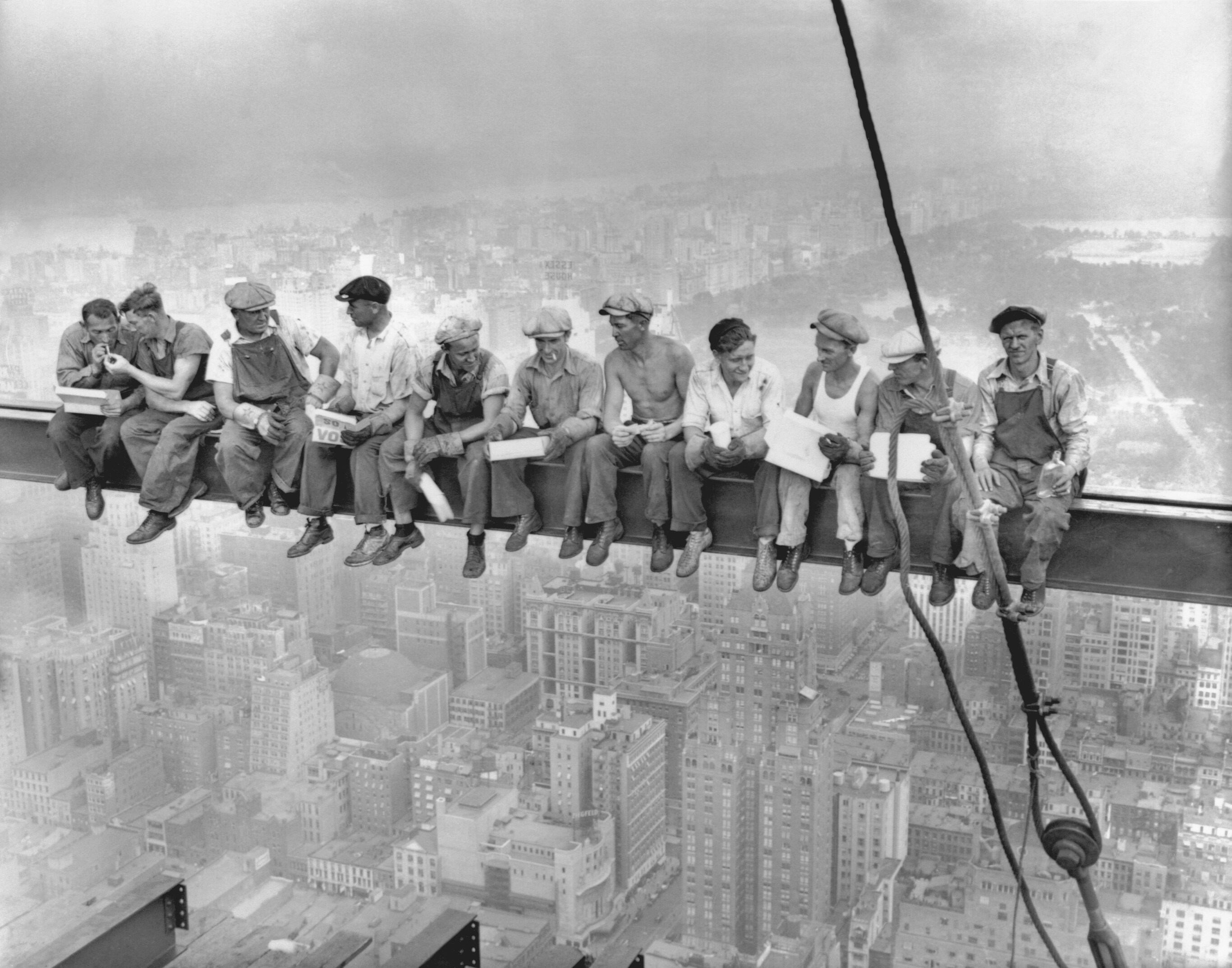
Lunch atop a Skyscraper, 1932, Eleven men sitting on a steel beam high over a skyscraper. Matty O’Shaughnessy - far left, Sonny Glynn - far right.

Sonny Glynn (born 1903 Shanaglish - died 1953 New York) and Matty O’Shaughnessy (born 1901 Shanaglish - died 1978 Shanaglish) emigrated to New York City from Shanaglish in the early 1920s. Both found construction work on the Rockefeller Center and have been identified by documentary film maker, Seán Ó Cualáin, in the film Lón sa Spéir, as two of the eleven men in the iconic 1932 photograph, Lunch atop a Skyscraper. A copy of the photograph hangs in Whelan's Bar in Shanaglish.
