= Murder of the Loughnane brothers =

1920 double murder in Ireland

Murder of Patrick and Harry Loughnane
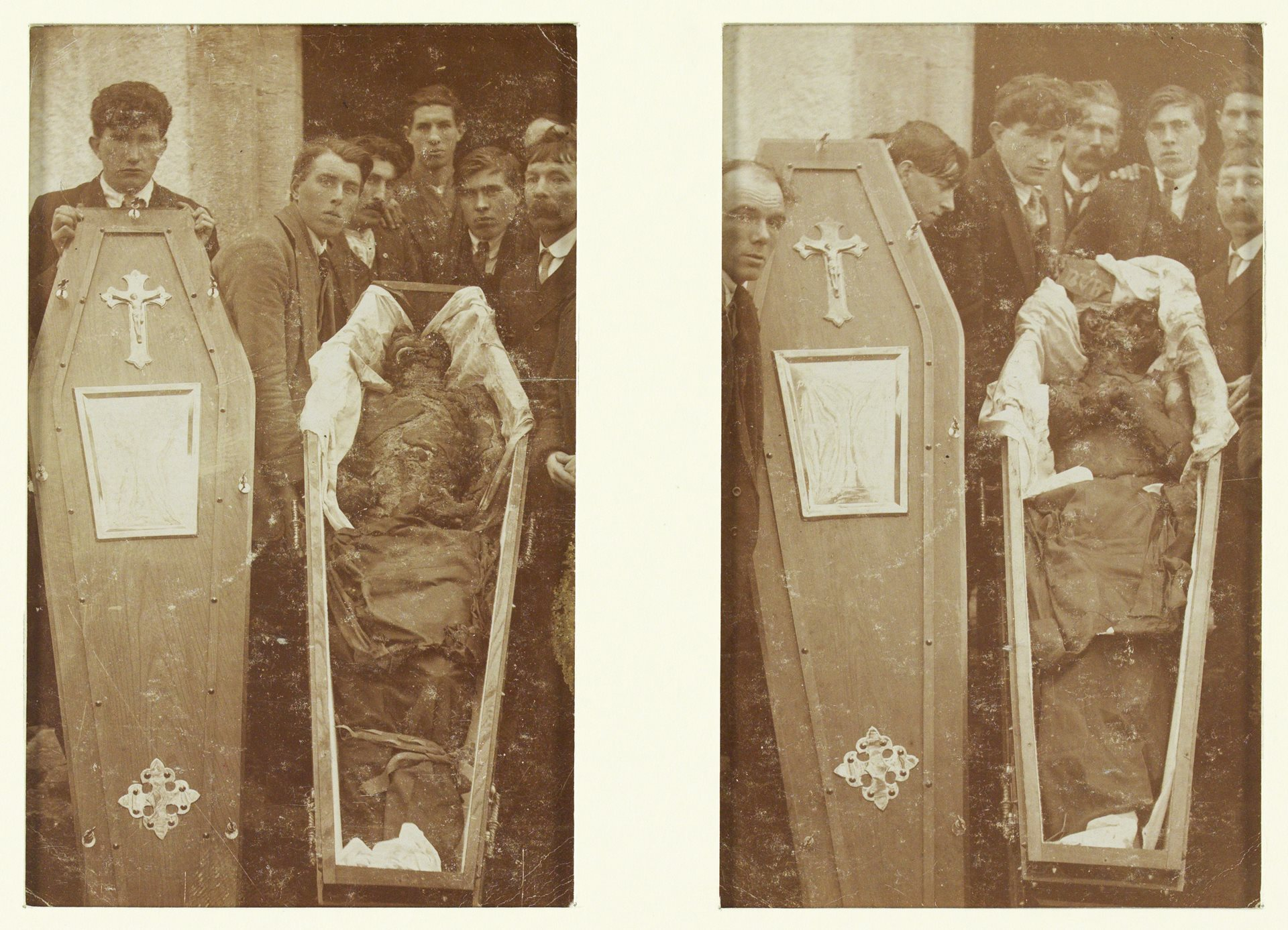
- Mutilated corpses of Patrick and Harry Loughnane
- Date: 26 November 1920 (106 years ago)
- Location: Gort, County Galway, Ireland
- Perpetrators: Royal Irish Constabulary, Auxiliary Division and Black and Tans
- Deaths: Patrick Loughnane (aged 29) and Harry Loughnane (aged 23)

Patrick and Harry Loughnane were brothers from Shanaglish in County Galway, Ireland, who were abducted, tortured and then murdered by members of the Royal Irish Constabulary (RIC) and their auxiliaries in November 1920. The images of their mutilated corpses became a symbol of the atrocities of British forces during the Irish War of Independence.

== Background ==
The town of Gort was a barracks town with a strong presence of Royal Irish Constabulary (RIC) personnel, and during the Irish War of Independence this included the Auxiliary Division (ADRIC) and other auxiliary forces who became known as the "Black and Tans". The Black and Tans were notorious for their brutality against Irish civilians, which included extrajudicial killings. Less than a month before the murder of Patrick and Harry Loughnane, the Black and Tans had killed a young mother, Eileen Quinn, in a drive-by shooting in Gort on 1 November 1920. Two weeks later, British forces had kidnapped and executed a priest, Michael Griffin, in Galway City.

Patrick "Pat" Loughnane was a member of the Irish Republican Army (IRA) suspected of having raided the home of William Carr, a former member of the RIC, in order to obtain a gun. Harry Loughnane was a member of the local Sinn Féin club. Pat's IRA company had carried out an ambush at Castledaly on 30 October which had resulted in the death of one RIC member and four others were taken prisoner. Both the Loughnane brothers were also prominent local hurlers for Beagh GAA in Shanaglish, of which Pat was the captain and Harry the goalkeeper.

== Murder ==
As night fell on 26 November 1920, Patrick and Harry Loughnane were helping with the threshing of corn when they were arrested by a combined detachment of RIC and Auxiliary forces led by C. W. Owen, who were searching for wanted men in south Galway. They were taken to Gort RIC Barracks where they were interrogated before being tied to the tailgate of a lorry and dragged through the streets to Drumharsna Castle, where they were executed and their bodies were burnt. Their mother Katie and sister Nora attempted to track them down, travelling to RIC barracks and Auxiliary bases around Galway City, but were unable to locate them or find any information as to their whereabouts. Three days after their arrest, they were contacted by Auxiliaries who informed them that the brothers had escaped from custody.

On 5 December, the mutilated bodies of Patrick and Harry Loughnane were discovered in a pond near Ardrahan by their cousin, Michael "Tully" Loughnane. He later claimed that he had a vision that the brothers were lying in a pond that he knew of, and told others that he saw them there in a dream. The bodies showed clear signs of torture. Two of Harry's fingers had been cut off and his right arm was broken at the shoulder, Patrick's legs and wrists were broken, and both had severely fractured skulls possibly caused by grenades being detonated in their mouths.

The mutilated corpses were photographed by local teacher Tomás OhEighin in their coffins, which were held upright by local attendees. The funeral mass was held on 7 December by Father John Nagle, the parish priest for Shanaglish. The brothers were buried side by side. Patrick was 29 years old and Harry 23 years old at the time of their deaths.
