= Valentine Flood =

Irish anatomist and physician

Valentine Flood, M.D. (died 1847), was an Irish anatomist and medical doctor who died of typhus while treating fever victims in County Tipperary during the Great Irish Famine.

== Early life ==
Flood was born in about 1800 in Dublin, where his father, Henry, practised as a barrister. His grandfather was the member of the Irish House of Commons Warden Flood (1735–1797).

== Education ==
Flood entered William Dease's private medical school in about 1818 and studied at Trinity College, Dublin, as a member of which he took the degrees of B.A. in 1820, M.B. and M.A. in 1823, and M.D. in 1830. After serving the apprenticeship, at that time necessary for becoming licensed by the Irish College of Surgeons, to Richard Carmichael, he took out the letters testimonial of the college, of which he ultimately became a fellow, and in 1828 or 1829 was appointed demonstrator of anatomy in the school of medicine connected with the Richmond Hospital.

== Work ==
His increasing reputation as an anatomist led to his being chosen a lecturer on anatomy in the Richmond school about 1831–2. For a few seasons he gave his undivided attention to this branch of the profession, and became a favourite among the pupils. As a private teacher he eventually commanded one of the best classes in Dublin. Had Flood continued these pursuits, for which he was so admirably adapted, it is certain that he would have enjoyed a highly prosperous career. But becoming ambitious of succeeding as a general practitioner, he connected himself with one of the Dublin dispensaries about 1835, and laboured incessantly among the poor of the district in which he lived. Due to his efforts to become a doctor, his classes were neglected; students first complained, then rebelled, and finally deserted him. Having lost position both as a lecturer and a private teacher, Flood was eventually obliged to leave Dublin. He went to London, and became associated with a medical school in Charlotte Street, Fitzroy Square. He also gave private tuition from his residence at 37 Bernard Street, Russell Square. His health became impaired, and in 1846 he returned to Ireland.

=== Publications ===
As early as 1828 Flood published at Dublin the first volume of a work never completed, entitled 'The Anatomy and Physiology of the Nervous System,’ 12mo, which, though not without merit, lacked lucidity of style, and attracted little attention. In 1839 he issued the treatise upon which his fame will chiefly rest, 'The Surgical Anatomy of the Arteries, and Descriptive Anatomy of the Heart: together with the Physiology of the Circulation in Man and inferior Animals,’ 12mo, London, 1839. During his connection with the Richmond school he brought out a work on 'The Anatomy and Surgery of Femoral and Inguinal Hernia. Illustrated with eight folio plates, drawn on stone by Mr. William Lover, from dissections and designs by Dr. Flood,’ fol., London, 1843, an excellent compilation. Flood was a member of the Royal Irish Academy.

== Famine relief ==
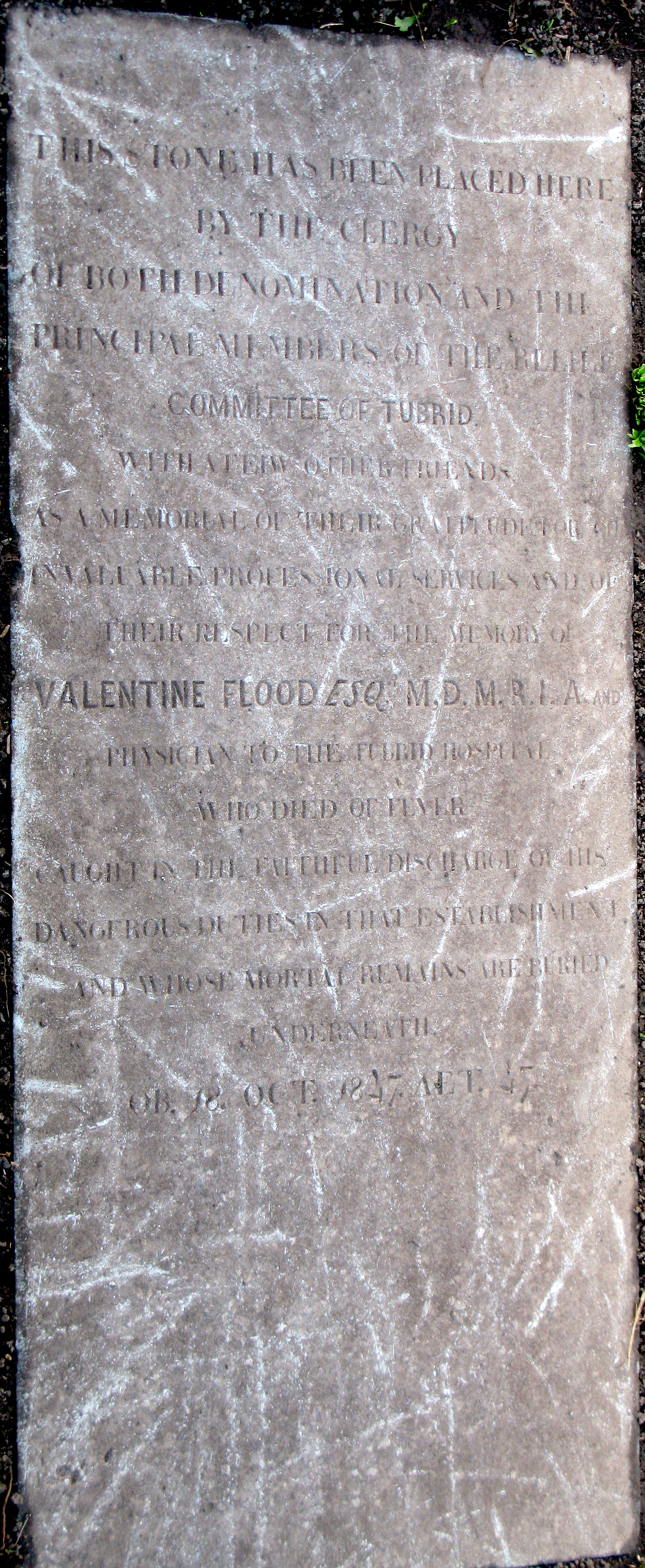
Headstone erected to Flood at Tubrid by members of the Catholic and Protestant communities in recognition of his work during the Famine

During the Great Irish Famine, Flood obtained one of the appointments afforded by the Board of Health to some fever sheds at Tubrid, in the county of Tipperary. In the course of his work he contracted typhus, of which he died on 18 October 1847. A stone was erected to his memory by the clergy of both denominations, and the principal members of the relief committee at Tubrid.
