= Kevin Quinn (sportsman) =

Irish cricketer and rugby union player

Personal information
- Full name: Kevin Joseph Quinn
- Born: 14 March 1923; Gort, Connacht, Ireland
- Died: 1 May 2002 (aged 79); Dublin, Leinster, Ireland
- Batting: Right-handed
- Bowling: Slow left-arm orthodox
- Relatives: Frank Quinn (brother); Gerry Quinn (brother)

Domestic team information
- Years: Team
- 1957–1959: Ireland

Career statistics
Competition	First-class
Matches	3
Runs scored	49
Batting average	9.80
100s/50s	–/–
Top score	25
Balls bowled	12
Wickets	0
Bowling average	–
5 wickets in innings	–
10 wickets in match	–
Best bowling	–
Catches/stumpings	–/–
- Source: Cricinfo, 23 October 2018

Kevin Joseph Quinn (14 March 1923 – 1 May 2002) was an Irish first-class cricketer and rugby union international.

Born at Gort in County Galway, Quinn was educated at Belvedere College in Dublin, before studying medicine at the Royal College of Surgeons. While studying there, he played rugby union for Old Belvedere and won five Test caps for Ireland. The first of these came against France in the 1947 Five Nations Championship. A further Test that year against Australia followed at Lansdowne Road, before earning three further caps in the 1953 Five Nations Championship.

Playing club cricket for Phoenix in Dublin, Quinn later made his debut in first-class cricket for Ireland against Scotland in 1957 at College Park, Dublin. He made two further first-class appearances for Ireland, in 1958 against Scotland at Alloway, and Leicestershire at Leicester on Ireland's 1959 tour of England. He scored 49 runs across his three matches, with a top score of 25. He worked as a doctor outside of sports. Two of his brothers, Frank Quinn and Gerry Quinn, both played cricket for Ireland; additionally, Gerry also played international rugby union for Ireland. Quinn died at Dublin in May 2002.
