= Gort =

Town in County Galway, Ireland

Gort Gort Inse Guaire / An Gort (Irish)
- Town
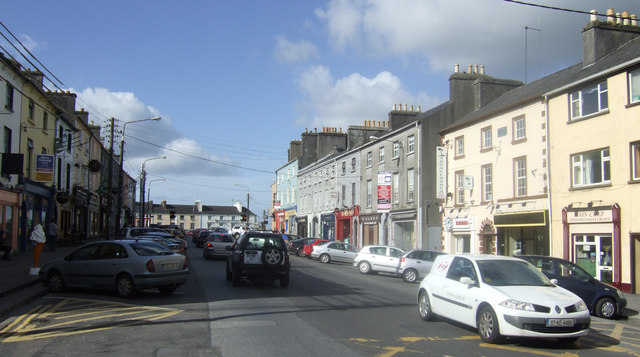
- Bridge Street, Gort in 2007

- Location in Ireland
- Coordinates: 53.066°N 8.818°W
- Country: Ireland
- Province: Connacht
- County: County Galway
- Elevation: 43 m (141 ft)

Population (2022)
  - Total: 2,870
- Time zone: UTC±0 (WET)
  - Summer (DST): UTC+1 (IST)
- Eircode routing key: H91
- Telephone area code: +353(0)91
- Irish Grid Reference: M451019

Gort (Irish: Gort Inse Guaire or An Gort) is a town of around 2,800 inhabitants in County Galway in the west of Ireland. Located near the border with County Clare, the town lies between the Burren and the Slieve Aughty and is served by the R458 and R460 regional roads, which connect to the M18 motorway.

== Etymology ==
Gort is short for the complete Irish name, Gort Inse Guaire (gort: a meadow, field, inse: an island, and Guaire: a proper name) and translates to "field of Guaire's island".

== History ==
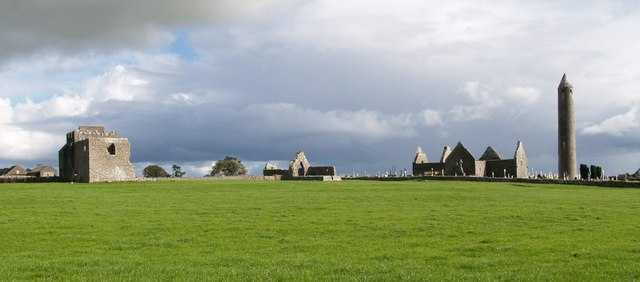
Kilmacduagh monastic site, reputedly founded in the 7th century, is approximately 5 km from Gort.

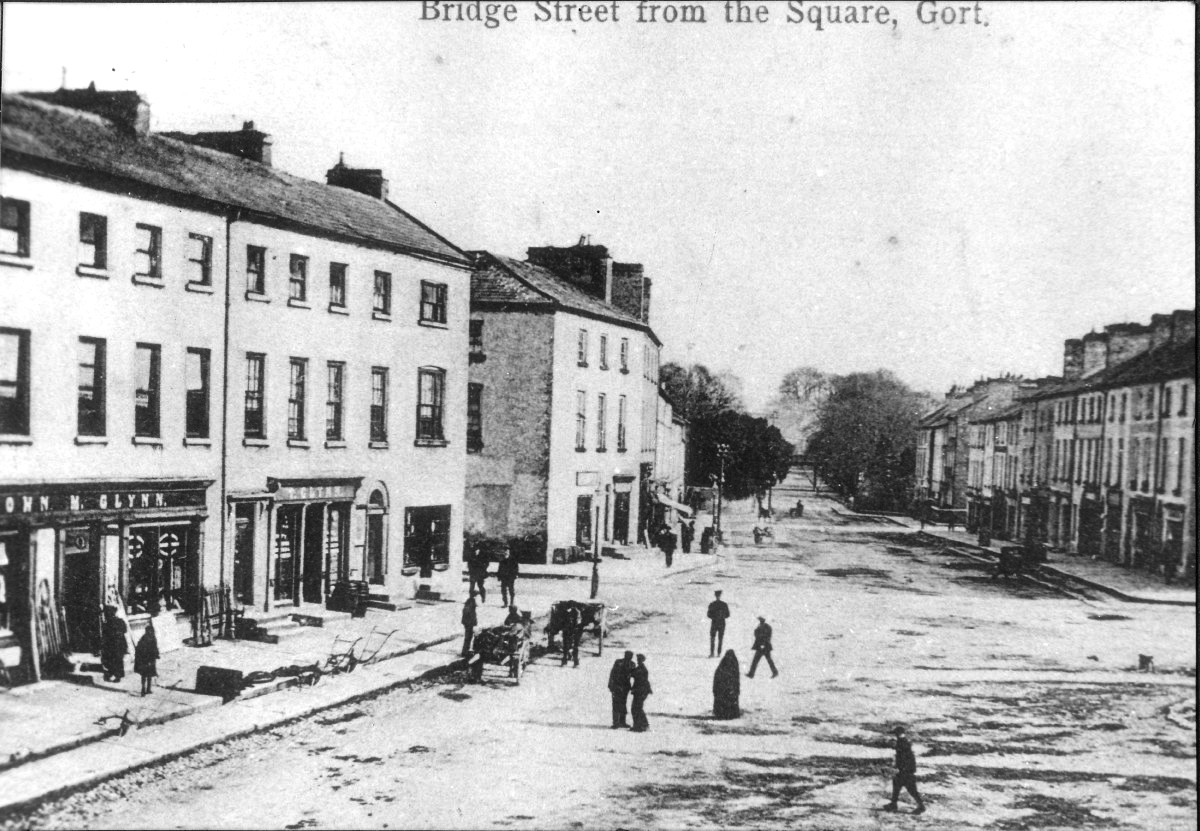
Bridge St., Gort c. 1900

Evidence of ancient settlement in the area includes ringfort, souterrain and holy well sites in the townlands of Gort, Ballyhugh, Cloghnakeava, Cloonnahaha and Lavally. In 2022, a large Bronze Age fort, located in Coole Park near Gort, was dated between 800 and 1200 BCE during archaeological work in the Burren lowlands.

The Guaire in Gort Inse Guaire refers to King Guaire "The Generous" (Guaire Aidne mac Colmáin), the seventh century King of Connacht. Guaire reputedly kept royal residences in Gort on a small island on the Gort river and also built a fort in nearby Kinvara named Dunguaire ("Fort of Guaire" in Irish). He was the patron of his first cousin St. Colman MacDuagh (giving him the land for Kilmacduagh monastery)

During the Middle Ages the chiefs of Cenél Áeda na hEchtge, the O'Shaughnessys (Ó Seachnasaigh, a clan descended from Guaire Aidhneach), had their principal stronghold in Gort, a castle on the island site which later became a cavalry barracks. The castle, and manor house, were put under siege in 1652 by Cromwellian forces. The structures were taken, burned, and later destroyed.

At the end of the 17th century, the O'Shaughnessy lands were confiscated and granted to Sir Thomas Prendergast, 1st Baronet, whose grandson was John Prendergast Smyth, 1st Viscount Gort. The centre of the town was built at this time (the late period in Georgian architecture) according to Lord Gort's plans. It was designed around a large triangular market.

In the 18th and 19th century, the Gort Races took place at the Newtown Course. There were prizes and this was hosted by the local landlords for the "turf loving gentry of both provinces" (Munster and Connacht).

There was a large flour mill built along the river in 1806, it was 4 stories tall, with a wooden wheel, and very active. It operated until 1966. It was sold to the Gort Co-operative Mart and destroyed in 1985.

The Great Famine caused hardship and destitution in Gort, with a decrease in the population in the mid-19th century. Many people emigrated to Canada and the United States, while others fell ill and died. In 1841, the town had a population of 3,056, in 1861 the population was 2,097. There was unrest among the population, as well as rampant theft. There were also a number of relief and work schemes in the area. Gort's Fever Hospital, and the adjacent workhouse, were built at this time.

Coole House, Lady Gregory's home, served as a base for the Irish Literary Revival in the late 1800s and early 20th century. There is an "Autograph Tree", still there, that has the carved initials of some of her notable guests: George Bernard Shaw, William Butler Yeats, Seán O'Casey, Jack B. Yeats, John M. Synge, and Lady Margaret Sackville. W. B. Yeats bought a tower house, Thoor Ballylee, from the Gregorys, restored it, and made it his summer residence in the 1920s. Yeats wrote about the restoration using "smithy work from the Gort forge". Jack B. Yeats painted and drew scenes of everyday life in Gort.

As a barracks town, Gort had a strong presence of Royal Irish Constabulary (RIC) and Black and Tans during the Irish War of Independence (1919–1921). A young woman, Eileen Quinn, was shot dead while holding her infant just outside of the town by the Auxiliary Division of the RIC on 1 November 1920 – in what has been described as "essentially a drive-by shooting". On November 26 the Loughnane brothers were interrogated in the Gort barracks before being "tied to the tailgate of a lorry and dragged to Drumharsna Castle" and killed by the RIC. RIC personnel conducted raids, tortured, stole, and terrorised people in Gort and the area. Beatings took place at the Gort barracks. The town also hosted a military court, which investigated Eileen Quinn's murder.

Starting in the early 2000s, there was an influx of Brazilian immigrants to Gort; in 2006, they made up around 30% of the town's population. In 2006, the town hosted celebrations of Brazilian Carnival and a branch of Brazilian evangelical church Assembléia de Deus, and the local Catholic church held services in both English and Portuguese.

== Geography ==
Gort is in County Galway and lies just north of the border with County Clare. This is on the old Galway to Limerick road (now the R458), and is about halfway between Ennis and Loughrea. It is around 35 kilometres (22 mi) by road from Galway City.

The town straddles the Gort River, a river that "disappears" underground several times between its source and Galway Bay. Gort is in a valley between the exposed limestone region of the Burren, and the peaty hills of the Slieve Aughty.

The town is in the historical territory of Uí Fiachrach Aidhne also known as Maigh Aidhne ("the plain of Aidhne"), which is within the diocese of Kilmacduagh (Cill Mhic Dhuach). Gort stands in 3 parishes and 3 townlands, namely Beagh, Kilmacduach and Kiltartan, each in the barony of Kiltartan.

== Population ==
Historical population
Year	Pop.	±%
1821	2,559	—
1831	2,627	+2.7%
1841	3,056	+16.3%
1851	2,398	−21.5%
1861	2,097	−12.6%
1871	1,773	−15.5%
1881	1,719	−3.0%
1891	1,498	−12.9%
1901	1,339	−10.6%
1911	1,166	−12.9%
1926	1,083	−7.1%
1936	1,034	−4.5%
1946	1,046	+1.2%
1951	1,008	−3.6%
1956	1,094	+8.5%
1961	1,044	−4.6%
1966	990	−5.2%
1971	975	−1.5%
1981	1,095	+12.3%
1986	1,021	−6.8%
1991	1,093	+7.1%
1996	1,182	+8.1%
2002	1,776	+50.3%
2006	2,734	+53.9%
2011	2,644	−3.3%
2016	2,994	+13.2%
2022	2,870	−4.1%

As of the 2016 census, Gort had around 3,000 inhabitants and was one of the most diverse towns in Ireland, with 26.6% being non-Irish.

According to the 2006 census, approximately 40% of the residents of Gort were non-Irish, mainly Brazilians. These people originally came to work in the meat processing plants in Gort, where the pay is generally much higher than in similar plants in Brazil. According to Claire Healy's Irish Migration Studies in Latin America, a "large community of Brazilians now live, work and attend school in Gort, gradually altering the appearance and the character of the town". By the time of the 2011 census, non-Irish nationals accounted for 27.2% of the population. The largest group (417 people) were still Brazilians, followed by UK nationals (81).

== Economy ==
Gort was once an agricultural market town. As of the 21st century, it is home to a Lidl, an Aldi, and a Supervalu. It was one of the worst affected towns in Ireland in the post-2008 recession. According to a 2019 Irish Times article, "[b]etween 2006 and 2011, it lost 400 jobs and 14 per cent of its population. Jobs were lost with the closure of Duffy Meats, a factory in which many Brazilians had been working, and also when the construction industry imploded".

Gort Co-operative Mart was founded in 1962, operated in the town until 1996, when it moved 2.5 kilometres out of the centre. As of 2020, approximately 16,500 cattle and 7,000 sheep "passed through its gate with a €15.6 million turnover".

There are three factories in town: counter fabricator Top Form, electronics maker Lisk, and medical device maker Natus.

In December 2022, An Bord Pleanála overturned a Galway County Council planning decision and permission was granted for a biogas plant near the town. As of August 2023, a challenge against this decision was being heard by the High Court.

=== Tourism ===
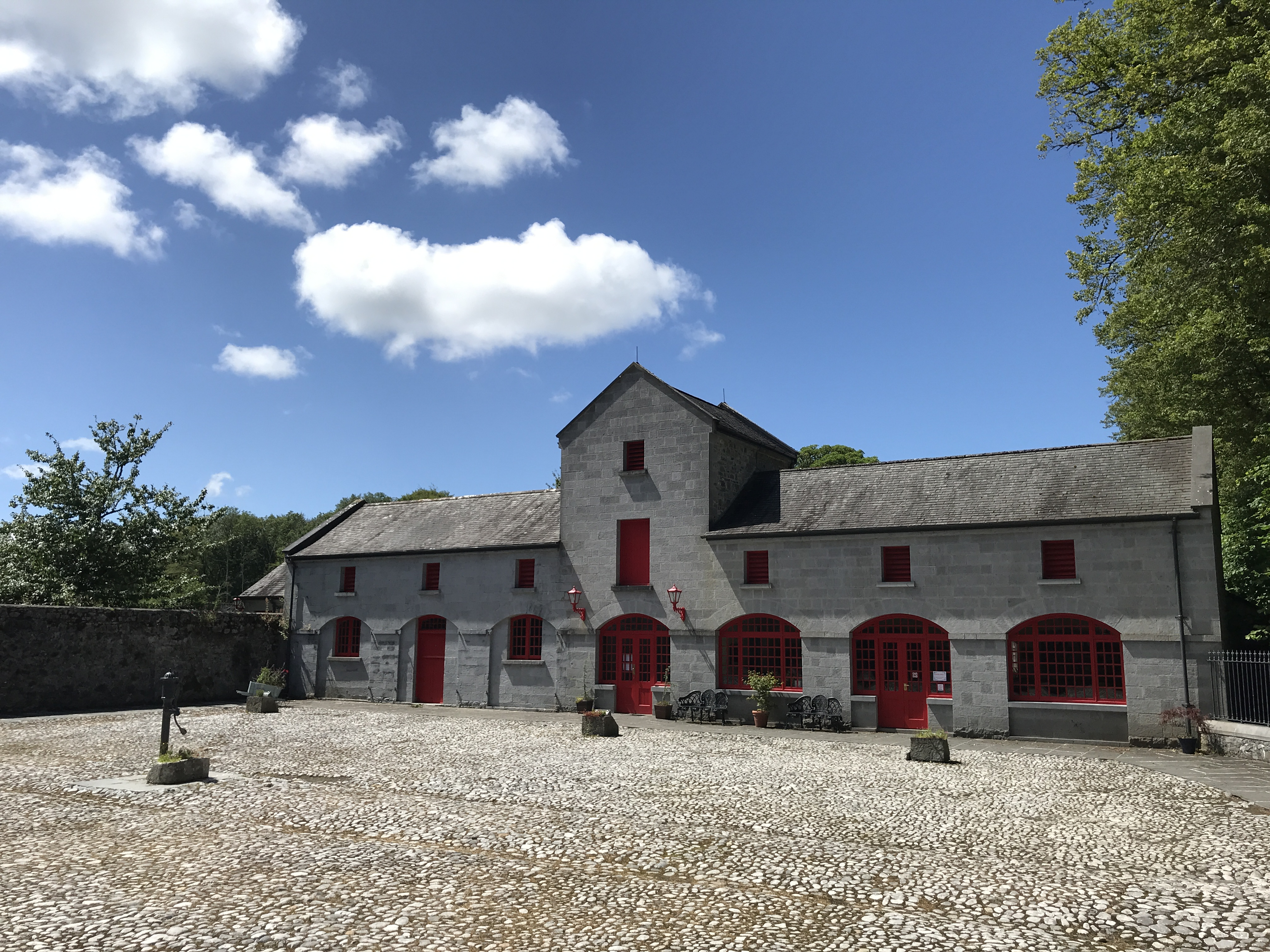
Stable yard and visitor centre of Coole Park

According to a 2019 Irish Times article, local business people saw tourism as an important sector to expand in the town. Gort has a number of bars and restaurants, and guest accommodation. The websites of Fáilte Ireland and the "Burren Lowlands" destination marketing group, list nearby tourist destinations as The Burren, Coole Park Visitor Centre & Gardens, Kilmacduagh cathedral churches and round tower, Thoor Ballylee, and Kiltartan Gregory Museum.

== Culture ==
A number of the town's cultural organisations are grouped under an umbrella organisation, the Gorgeous Gort Forum. The Wild Swans Theatre Company is a local group of actors which put on plays in St. Colman's Hall. The Cooley Collins Festival is a traditional Irish music event that takes place at the end of October. There is a museum dedicated to Lady Gregory, Kiltartan Gregory Museum, in an old schoolhouse. The Yeats Thoor Ballylee Society keeps Yeats' 15th-century tower house open with events, a studio, and tours. Guaire Magazine is a magazine on local history and culture, it dates back to the mid-1970s. Since 1981, the town hosts the annual Gort and District Show, a community event which awards prizes in a number of categories from photography and crafts, to flowers and ponies. There is a Gort Arts Collective of 40 plus regional artists which organised a small St. Brigid's Day festival in 2023.

== Places of interest ==
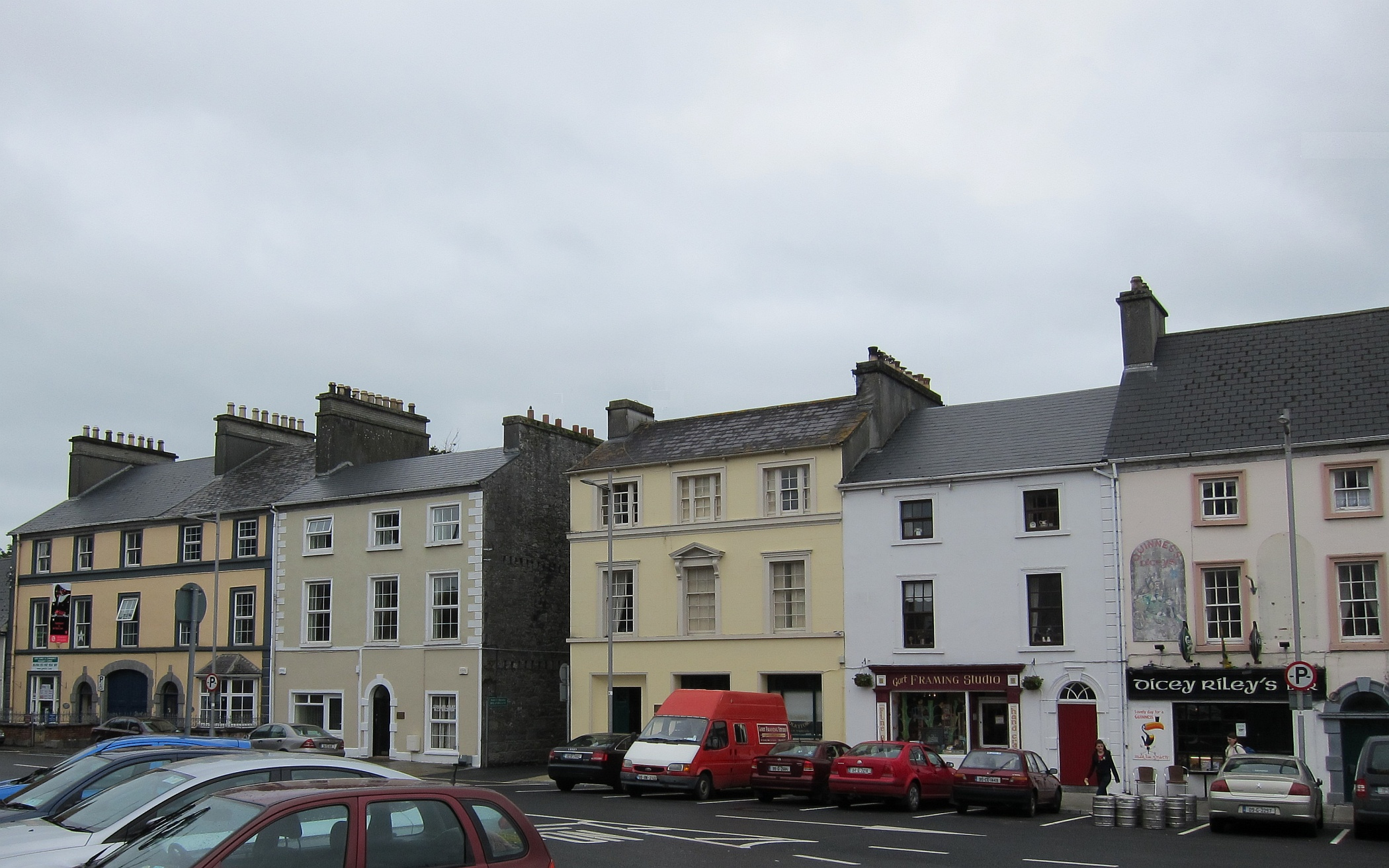
Buildings in the Market Square of Gort dating to c. 1800

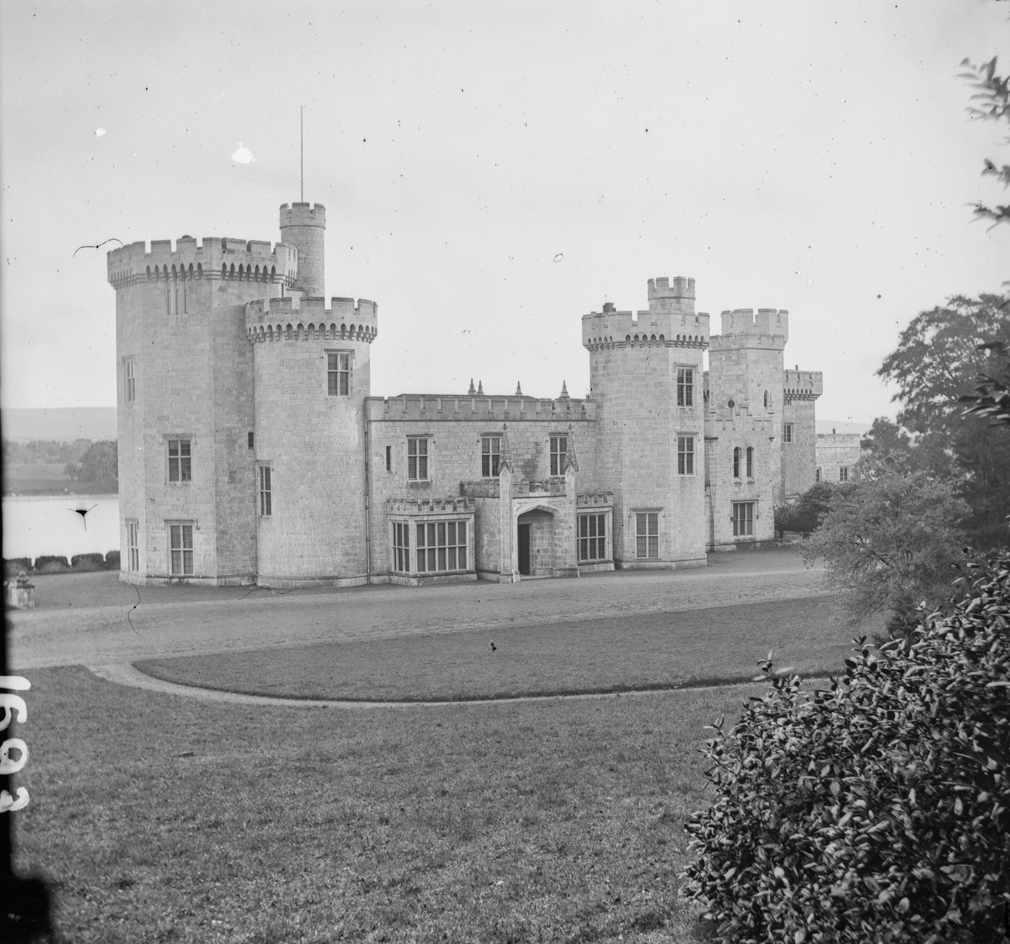
Lough Cutra Castle

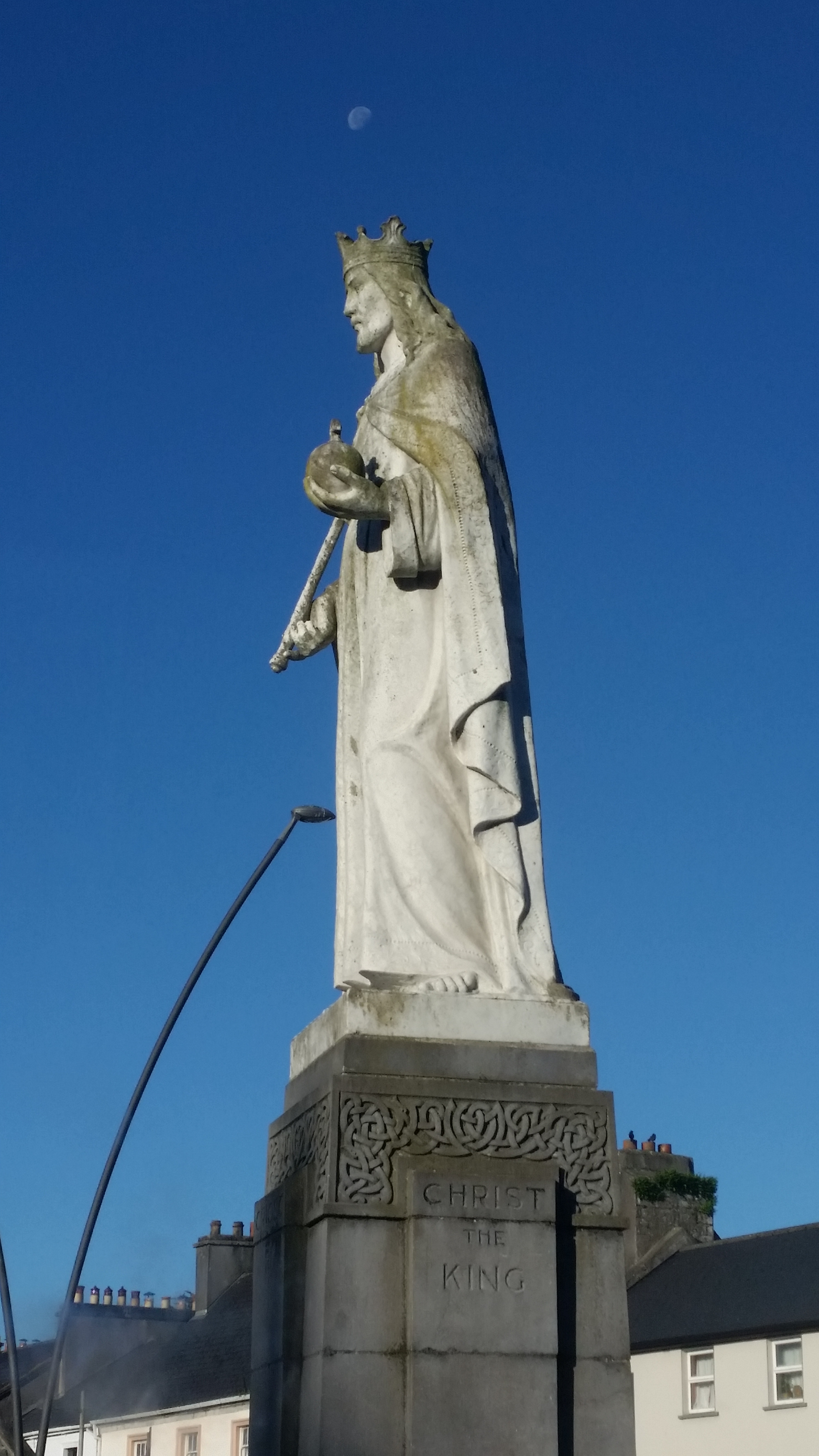
Christ the King, by Albert Power, marble, 1932

Gort has a number of buildings of architectural interest, being a well preserved planned Georgian period market town.

There is a mid-19th century Weigh House in the centre of the old square, as well as a 1933 marble sculpture of Christ the King by the Irish sculptor Albert Power. The town hall is a former 19th century school which is now used for community theatre. There is a large Catholic church, St. Colman's Church (built 1825), with a public park, Canon Quinn Park, behind. The old Church of Ireland church, built c. 1820, is now the public library. The Gort River Walk, opened a 3 km looped walking trail along the Gort River with a new bridge in October 2022.

Next to the river and the original bridge (constructed in 1771) is Bridge House, the residence of Lord Gort before the move to Lough Cutra Castle. This house, dated around 1770, has since been added to and was a Sisters of Mercy convent from 1857 until 2022, with a primary school on the grounds. In 2022 it housed Ukrainian refugees and it was purchased by the county in 2025 as part of a €1 million project to develop a community centre.

== Sports ==
Gort GAA club was founded in 1884 and is primarily dedicated to its hurling team. The town also has a rugby club, the Gort Gladiators, and two football (soccer) teams, Coole Football Club and Gort United Football Club. There is also the Gort Golf Club.

Cliona D'Arcy, of Gort, won the heavyweight gold medal at the 2022 IBA Youth World Boxing Championships, becoming the first Irish woman to do so.

== Transport ==
=== Motorway ===
Gort is accessible from the M18 motorway from Shannon to Galway, at Junction 16. The M18 ends at junction 18 of the M6 motorway. The road continues northbound as the M17 towards Tuam and Sligo. The segment from Ennis to Gort of the M18 motorway bypass of the town was officially opened on 12 November 2010. This was followed by the Gort to Tuam section which opened on 27 September 2017.

=== Rail ===
Gort railway station opened on 15 September 1869 and was closed for goods traffic on 3 November 1975 and for passenger traffic on 5 April 1976. It was reopened in 2010 as part of the Western Railway Corridor project.

Gort rail services are on the Galway to Limerick route with connections to Cork and Tralee from Limerick station and to Dublin via Athenry and Galway.

=== Bus ===
Gort is served by Bus Éireann routes 51 (north to Galway and south to Shannon and Limerick), 434 (to Galway), and Local Link Galway line 934 (to Loughrea).

== Education ==
The secondary school Gort Community School, founded in 1995, has more than 800 students, and serves a large area of south County Galway. The school facilities include a GAA pitch, rugby union pitch, football pitch, and canteen. The school's sports teams include hurling, rugby, soccer and swimming.

== Notable people ==
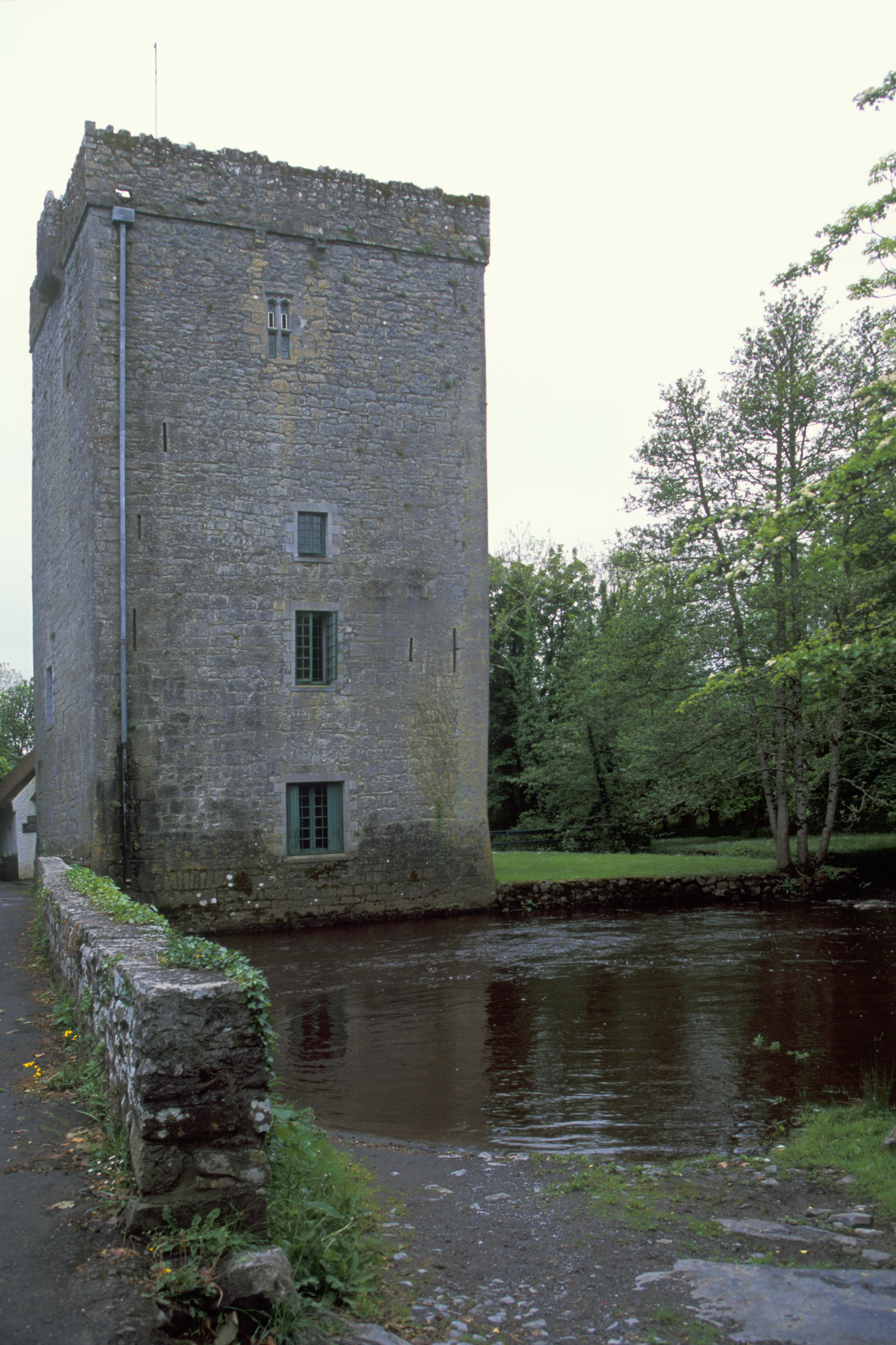
Thoor Ballylee, near Gort, was restored and used as a summer home by W. B. Yeats.

- Martin Coen (1933–1997), Irish priest and historian
- Lady Gregory (1852–1932), lived at Coole Park
- Aidan Harte (b. 1988), inter-county hurler
- Eileen Huban (c. 1896–1935), actress from Gort, active in New York City
- Robert Lahiffe (1909–1975), politician
- Thomas Laughnan (1824–1864), recipient of the Victoria Cross, was born in Gort
- Sylvie Linnane (b. 1956), All-Star hurler
- Guaire Aidne mac Colmáin (d. 663), the 7th century King of Connacht
- Colman mac Duagh (560–632), saint
- Lisa McInerney (b. 1981), novelist and winner of the Women's Prize for Fiction
- Paddy McMahon Glynn (1855–1931), born in Gort, served variously as Attorney-General of Australia, Australian Minister for External Affairs and Minister for Home Affairs
- John Prendergast-Smyth, 1st Viscount Gort (1742–1817), politician
- Frank Quinn (1915–1996), first-class cricketer
- Gerry Quinn (1917–1968), rugby international and first-class cricketer
- Kevin Quinn (1923–2002), rugby international and first-class cricketer
- Jack Butler Yeats (1871–1957), painter who depicted scenes of everyday life in Gort
- William Butler Yeats (1865–1939), Nobel Laureate poet who renovated an old tower house near the town (Thoor Ballylee) and took up residence

== In popular culture ==
Two documentary films, both released in 2018, explored the social fabric of Gort. The first, Town of Strangers, examines the impact of the immigrant population on the town's development as a cosmopolitan centre. The second, When All is Ruin Once Again, is a critically acclaimed documentary essay focused on Gort and the neighbouring village of Crusheen.
