= St. Colman's Church, Gort =

Church in County Galway, Ireland

Coordinates: 53.0663°N 8.8202°W

The Church of St. Colman is a Roman Catholic parish church located in the town of Gort in County Galway. Built in 1825 in a Gothic style, it was altered and extended in the late 19th and early 20th centuries, and is listed on the Record of Protected Structures by Galway County Council. The church is in the parish of Gort & Beagh in the Roman Catholic Diocese of Galway, Kilmacduagh and Kilfenora.

== History ==
The local landowner, John Prendergast-Smyth (later Viscount Gort), gave the site to Dr. Edmund Ffrench, Bishop of Kilmacduagh. The church, the design of which is associated by several sources with the architect James Pain, commenced construction from 1825 and was dedicated on 6 September 1829.

The chancel and sacristy were built c. 1876 and a tower and spire added c. 1900. Several of the 19th century later alterations are attributed to the architect William Hague, while Ralph Byrne was involved in additional works in the 1930s.

== See also ==
- St. Colman's Church, Claremorris, County Mayo
