= Tubrid =

Tubrid Tiobraid
- Civil parish
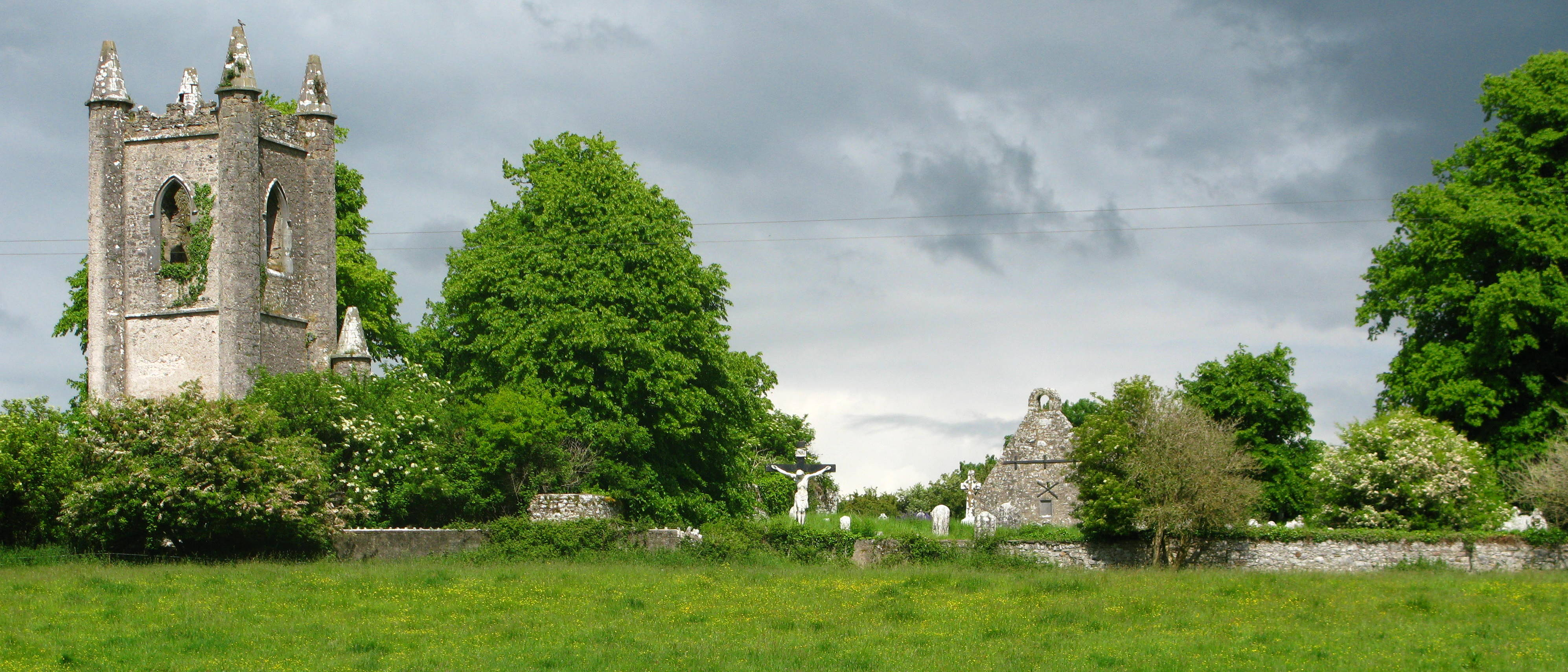
- View of two church ruins at Tubrid.

- Location in Ireland
- Coordinates: 52°18′54″N 7°57′00″W
- Country: Ireland
- Province: Munster
- County: County Tipperary
- Time zone: UTC+0 (WET)
  - Summer (DST): UTC-1 (IST (WEST))

Tubrid or Tubbrid (Irish: Tiobraid) is a civil and former ecclesiastical parish situated between the towns of Cahir and Clogheen in County Tipperary, Ireland. A cluster of architectural remains at the old settlement still known as Tubrid includes an ancient cemetery and two ruined churches of regional historical significance.

== Location ==
Tubrid is located about 4 kilometres (2.5 mi) from the village of Ballylooby, adjacent to an old stone bridge near Burgess. In 1841, the mail-road between Cork and Dublin via Cahir still passed through the village.

== Tubrid Mortuary Chapel ==
The Mortuary Chapel at Tubrid, reportedly built in 1644, in what is now the modern Catholic parish of Ballylooby, is long roofless. The structure shows some evidence of restoration work, notably steel tie-rods securing the gable walls. This work was carried out in 1911-12, due mainly to the efforts of the historian Fr. Patrick Power.

It is of particular historical significance as the burial site of many Counter-Reformation ecclesiastics including John Brenan Archbishop of Cashel, Eugene Duhy (O'Duffy) and most notably Geoffrey Keating.

Over the entrance door to the chapel is a Latin inscription which translates into English as :

Pray for the souls of Father Eugenius Duhy, Vicar of Tybrud,
and of Geoffrey Keating, D.D., Founders of this Chapel; and also
for all others, both Priests and Laics whose bodies lie in the same
chapel. In the year of our Lord 1644.

== St. John's, Tubrid ==
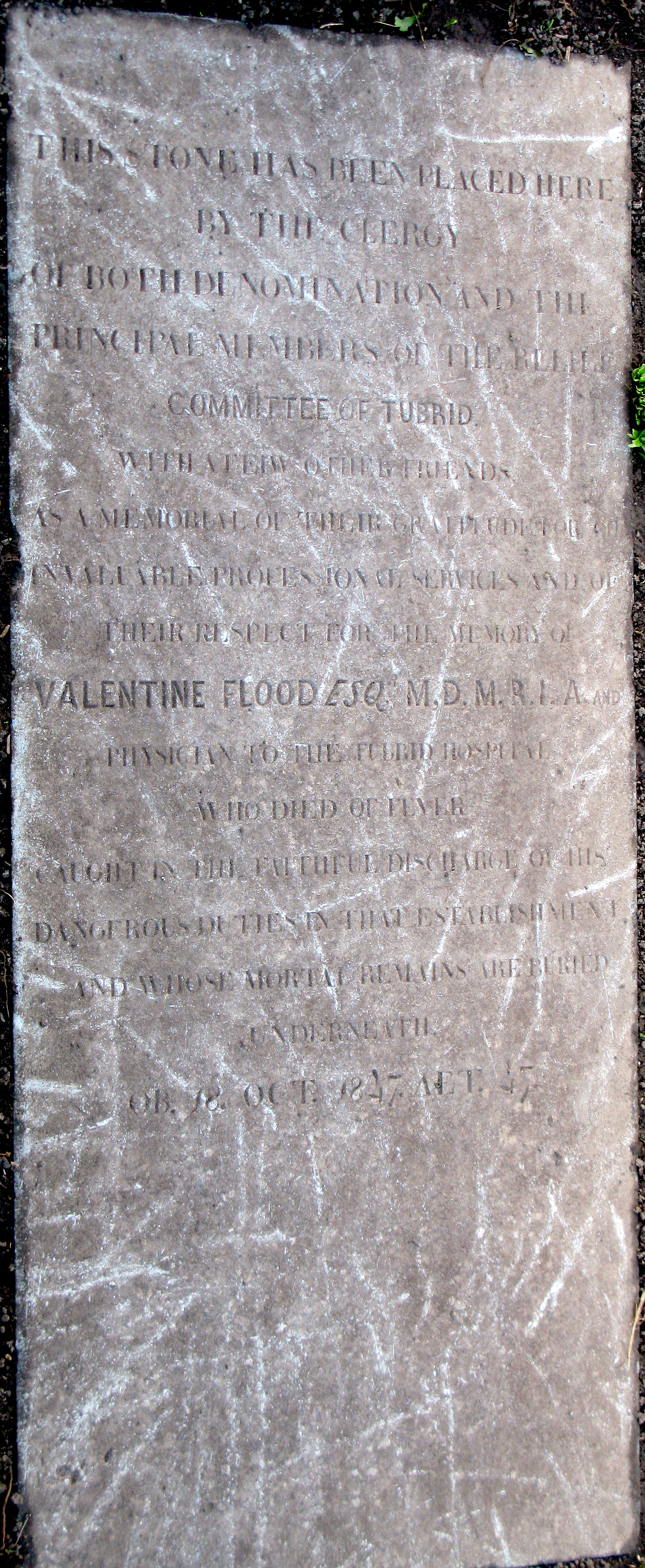
Memorial commissioned by both denominations to Dr. Valentine Flood, who died of Typhus contracted in the Tubrid 'fever sheds' during the Great Famine.

On the same site is the considerably larger 19th-century Protestant church, also now roofless and in a deteriorating condition. Completed in 1820, it functioned as the place of worship for the local Church of Ireland community until 1919, when it was abandoned.

The Catholic community eventually built a new church some 2.5k to the north-west, adjacent to which developed the village of Ballylooby.

== Sites of local interest ==
=== St. Ciaran's Well ===
According to Power, the parish derives its name from the well (Irish Tobraid Chiaráin) at which St. Declan baptised a local infant named Ciaran, who in time became a noted holy figure. It was said of Ciarán (Ciaran Mac Eochaidh) that he founded a monastery in the locality and that:

He worked many miracles and holy signs and this is the name of his monastery Tiprut [Tubrid] and this is where it is:--in the western part of the Decies in Ui Faithe between Slieve Grot (Galtee) and Sieve Cua and it is within the bishopric of Declan.

This holy well near the site, was in previous times a place of pilgrimage. St. Ciaran is remembered in the name of the church at Ballylooby. There was also, until recent times, an annual mass celebrated at this location.

=== Old Protestant Schoolhouse ===
To the front of the site is the former local schoolhouse which was completed soon after the construction of St. John's and is in danger of falling into a dilapidated condition.

=== Geoffrey Keating Monument ===
A commemorative monument was erected to the memory of Geoffrey Keating by the local community in 1990 beside the bridge at nearby Burgess, formerly believed to be his birthplace. Modern scholarship regards Moorstown Castle in the parish of Inishlounaght, Tipperary, as his probable birthplace.

=== Roosca Castle ===
The remains of Roosca (Ruscoe) castle may still be seen nearby. Its occupant during the 1641 Rebellion, James Butler, was hanged at Clonmel on 10 May 1653, in retaliation for attacks by his followers on Golden and his household transplanted to Connaught.
