= Drumharsna Castle =

Tower house in Galway, Ireland

Coordinates: 53°8′36″N 8°50′35″W

Drumharsna Castle (Irish: Caisleán Dhroimm Tharsna) is a tower house near Ardrahan, County Galway, in Ireland.

Drumharsna Castle in County Galway, Ireland.

== History ==
This castle is known to have been owned by Shane Ballagh in 1577 and was probably built some time before that. The castle was damaged when it was occupied in 1920 by the Auxiliary Division of the Royal Irish Constabulary (ADRIC) from Galway's D company stationed at Lenaboy house.

The castle was witness to the torture and murder of two brothers, Patrick and Harry Loughnane, who were arrested by the Auxiliaries on 26 November 1920. Pat was an officer in Beagh Company of the IRA and Harry was the secretary of the Sinn Féin cumann. The prisoners were taken to Drumharsna Castle, and their badly mutilated and burnt bodies were found dumped in a nearby pond over a week later.
