= St. Colman's Primary School =

St. Colman's Primary School may refer to:

- St. Colman's Primary School, Kilkeel, Kilkeel, County Down, Northern Ireland
- St. Colman's Primary School, Saval, County Down, Northern Ireland
- St. Colman's Primary School, Annaclone, Annaclone, County Down, Northern Ireland
- St. Colman's Primary School, Lawrencetown, Lawrencetown, County Down, Northern Ireland
- St. Colman's Primary School, Dromore, County Down, Northern Ireland
- St. Colman's Catholic School, Turtle Creek, Turtle Creek, Pennsylvania, United States
