= Thomas Traynor =

Member of the Irish Republican Army

- Born: 27 May 1882; Tullow, County Carlow, Ireland
- Died: 25 April 1921 (aged 39); Mountjoy Jail, Dublin, Ireland
- Cause of death: Execution by hanging
- Resting place: Glasnevin Cemetery
- Occupation: Cobbler
- Known for: Executed IRA volunteer; One of The Forgotten Ten
- Military career
- Allegiance: Irish Republic
- Branch: Irish Volunteers; Irish Republican Army
- Conflicts: Easter Rising; Irish War of Independence

Thomas Traynor (27 May 1882 – 25 April 1921) was a member of the Irish Republican Army (IRA) hanged in Mountjoy Prison during the Irish War of Independence.

== Background ==
Traynor was born on 27 May 1882 in Tullow, County Carlow, Ireland, and was 38 at the time of his death. He was an experienced soldier having been a member of the Boland's Mill garrison during the Easter Rising, 1916. After the Rising he was interned in Frongoch, Wakefield Jail and Mountjoy Jail where he shared a cell with Seán Mac Eoin.

He worked as a boot maker and was married with ten children. At the time of his death the eldest was 18 years and the youngest 5 months. The eldest son, Frank, represented Ireland at the 1928 Summer Olympics, competing as a bantamweight boxer.

== Capture and execution ==
Traynor was captured during an ambush on Auxiliaries in Brunswick Street, Dublin, on 14 March 1921, and tried on 5 April at City Hall. He was part of a party of IRA volunteers keeping watch outside a meeting at 144 Brunswick Street that included Seán MacBride. During the fight an IRA volunteer, Leo Fitzgerald, was killed, as were Constable James O'Farrell and Cadet Bernard Beard of the Dublin Metropolitan Police. Traynor was reportedly badly beaten by members of the Igoe Gang before his hanging.

Mark Grant-Sturgis, the Assistant Under-Secretary for Ireland, wrote:

Traynor, captured red handed with an attacking party when Auxiliaries were killed in Brnswick Street, was executed this morning. I don't think they will make much fuss as there is no sort of 'alibi' business this time - nor is he the usual 'youth', dear to 'The Freeman', as he is over 40 and has a pack of children, the poor deluded idiot.

On the day following his death, Gilbert Potter, a Royal Irish Constabulary (RIC) District Inspector based in Cahir, County Tipperary, and being held for Traynor's safe treatment was executed in reprisal by members of the Third Tipperary Brigade. Another IRA volunteer, John Donnelly, captured with Traynor was sentenced to death but later reprieved by David Lloyd George following the truce in June 1921.

== Remembered in popular culture ==
- In 1965 a statue was erected to Traynor in his native town of Tullow.
- The Ballad of Thomas Traynor was written in his memory.

== Reinterment ==
Traynor was one of a group of men hanged in Mountjoy Prison from 1920–21, commonly referred to as The Forgotten Ten. In 2001 he and the other nine, including Kevin Barry, were exhumed from their graves in the prison and given a full State Funeral. He is now buried in Glasnevin Cemetery in the capital city of Dublin.
