= St. Colman's Church, Claremorris =

Roman Catholic church in County Mayo, Ireland

Coordinates: 53.7226°N 8.9981°W

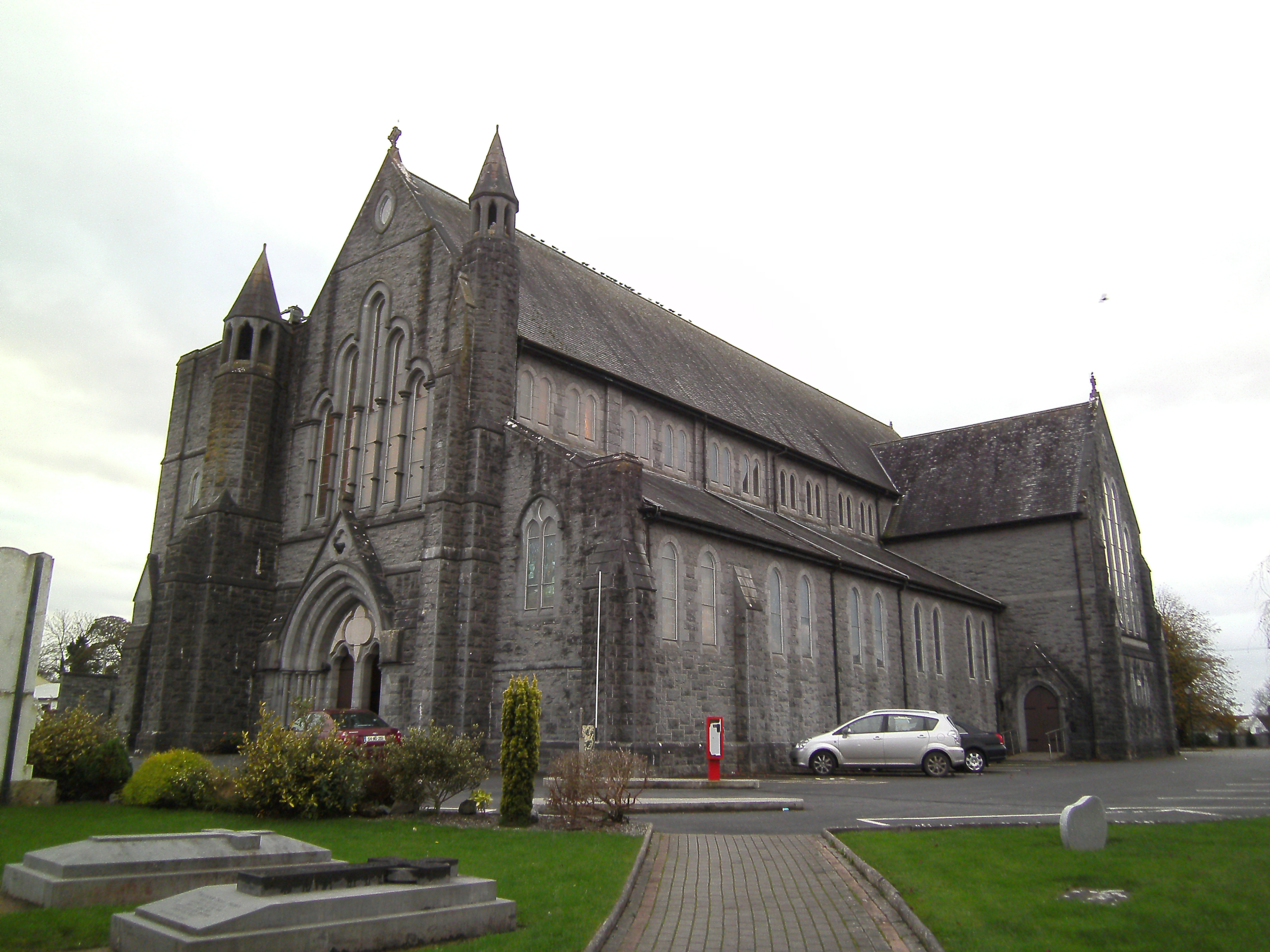
St Colman's Church

The Church of Saint Colman (in Irish: Eaglais Naomh Cólman) is a Roman Catholic parish church in Claremorris in County Mayo, Ireland. Located in the parish of Claremorris in the Roman Catholic Archdiocese of Tuam, it is traditionally associated with Saint Colmán and is dedicated to Our Lady of Good Counsel.

The church was designed in an Early English Gothic style by R. M. Butler, and was built between 1904 and 1911. A number of the stained glass windows in the church are associated with the studios of Harry Clarke in Dublin. In the gallery, there is Gothic-style timber panelled pipe organ. The church is included on the Record of Protected Structures maintained by Mayo County Council.

Another church within the same parish, the Church of Our Lady, is located at Barnacarroll.
