= List of national monuments in Connacht =

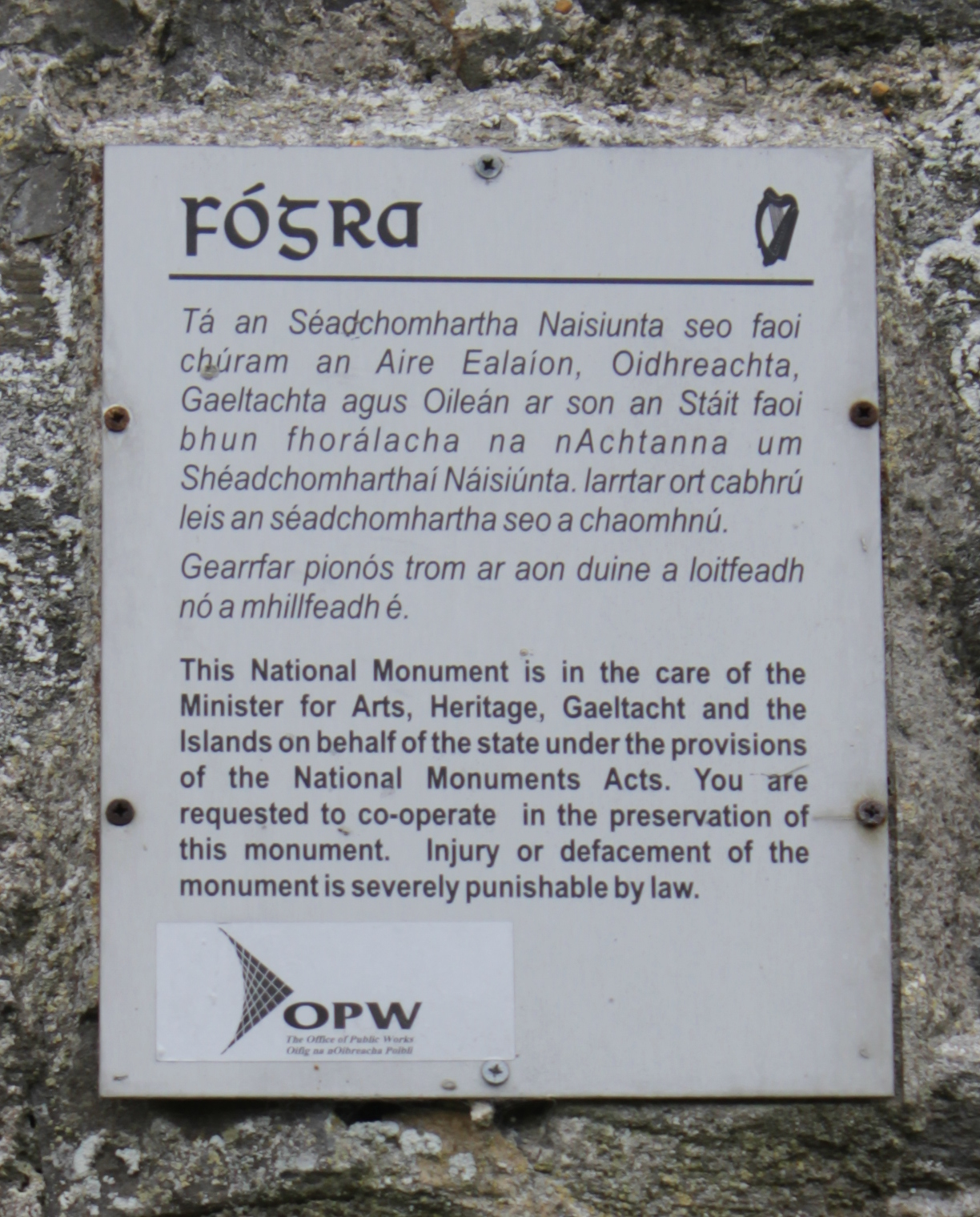
Photo of a typical notice at a national monument in the Republic of Ireland.

In the Republic of Ireland, a structure or site may be deemed to be a national monument, and therefore worthy of state protection, if it is of national importance. If the land adjoining the monument is essential to protect it, this land may also be protected.

== National monuments in Connacht ==
Galway - Leitrim - Mayo - Roscommon - Sligo

This list is initially sorted by county. If the list is sorted under another heading, the county links above will take you to the first item from the county in the sorted list

NM#	Monument name	Description	Image	Townland	County	Location
278	Abbert Demesne Church	Church		Abbert Demesne	53°25′34″N 8°41′01″W	
166	Knockmoy Abbey in Abbeyknockmoy	Abbey (Cistercian)		Abbeyknockmoy	53°26′25″N 8°44′34″W	
47	Kilconnell Abbey	Friary (Franciscan)		Kilconnell	53°19′57″N 8°24′03″W	
273	Dunmore Abbey	Friary (Augustinian)		Abbeyland North	53°37′05″N 8°44′29″W	
512	Clontuskert Abbey	Priory (Augustinian)		Abbeypark	53°16′57″N 8°12′56″W	
49	Annaghdown	Early Medieval Ecclesiastical Site		Annaghdown	53°23′13″N 9°04′21″W	
252	Ardamullivan Castle	Castle		Ardamullivan	53°00′16″N 8°49′45″W	
164	Athenry Abbey	Priory (Dominican)		Athenry	53°17′54″N 8°44′40″W	
406	Athenry Castle	Castle		Athenry	53°18′00″N 8°44′41″W	
371	Aughrim Ringforts	Two Ringforts		Attidermot	53°17′37″N 8°18′52″W	
470	Aughnanure Castle	Castle		Aughnanure	53°25′08″N 9°16′32″W	
369	Caheravoley Fort	House & Bawn		Caheravoley, Kilcahill	53°25′08″N 8°54′29″W	
42	Doonbeg Ringfort	Ringfort		Carrownlisheen (Inishmaan)	53°05′00″N 9°35′41″W	
42	Carrownlisheen Wedge Tomb (Diarmuid and Gráinne's Bed)	Wedge Tomb		Carrownlisheen (Inishmaan)	53°05′14″N 9°34′52″W	
42	Templesaghtmacree	Church		Carrownlisheen (Inishmaan)	53°05′02″N 9°35′25″W	
42	Carrownlisheen Cross	Cross		Carrownlisheen (Inishmaan)	53°04′50″N 9°34′32″W	
42	Labbanakinneriga	Church		Carrownlisheen (Inishmaan)	53°05′02″N 9°35′25″W	
42	Doonfarvagh	Cashel		Carrownlisheen (Inishmaan)	53°04′51″N 9°34′48″W	
42	Kilcoonagh Church	Church		Carrownlisheen (Inishmaan)	53°04′50″N 9°34′33″W	
42	Dún Conor (Dún Conchuir)	Cashel		Carrowntemple (Inishmaan)	53°05′00″N 9°35′41″W	
248	Dunmore Castle	Castle		Castlefarm	53°37′26″N 8°45′20″W	
467	St. Cuan's Well	Well & Cross slabs		Castlegar East	53°24′55″N 8°18′57″W	
428	Feartagar or Jennings Castle	Castle		Castlegrove East	53°34′11″N 8°56′34″W	
272	Isert Kelly Castle	Castle		Castlepark	53°09′29″N 8°43′08″W	
259	Kiltartan Castle	Castle		Castletown (Kiltartan)	53°05′25″N 8°48′27″W	
165	Claregalway Abbey	Friary (Franciscan)		Claregalway	53°20′48″N 8°56′40″W	
563	Cloonigny Castle	Ringfort & Castle		Cloonigny	53°21′17″N 8°21′17″W	
283	Derryhiveny Castle	Castle		Derryhiveny South	53°07′37″N 8°11′32″W	
527	Doorus Demesne wedge tomb	Wedge Tomb		Doorus Demesne	53°09′08″N 8°58′20″W	
254	Drumacoo	Early Medieval Ecclesiastical Site		Drumacoo	53°11′55″N 8°54′16″W	
365	Drumharsna Castle	Castle		Drumharsna South	53°08′36″N 8°50′35″W	
206	Fiddaun Castle	Castle		Tubber	53°00′38″N 8°52′46″W	
554	Kilnalekin Abbey	Abbey (Cistercian)		Friary	53°06′11″N 8°23′31″W	
439	Glinsk Castle	Castle		Glinsk	53°39′07″N 8°25′55″W	
52	High Island	Early Medieval Ecclesiastical Site		High Island and Kill	53°32′41″N 10°15′40″W	
412	Inchagoill	Early Medieval Ecclesiastical Site		Inchagoill	53°29′09″N 9°18′59″W	
41.01	Creggankeel Fort	Cashel		Inisheer	53°03′26″N 9°31′07″W	
41.05	St. Gobnet's Church (Kilgobnet)	Church		Inisheer	53°03′58″N 9°31′45″W	
41.06	Knockgrannary (Cnoc Raithní)	Burial Ground		Inisheer	53°03′54″N 9°31′24″W	
41.08	St. Cavan's Church	Church		Inisheer	53°03′50″N 9°30′50″W	
41.07	O'Brien's Castle (Great Fort, Furmina Castle)	Cashel		Inisheer	53°03′43″N 9°31′09″W	
41.02	Grave of the Seven Daughters (Cill na Seacht Niníon)	Early Medieval Ecclesiastical Site		Inisheer	53°03′26″N 9°31′06″W	
642	Kilcornan	Deserted Medieval Village		Kilcornan (Monivea)	53°18′48″N 8°42′49″W	
43.01	Arkin's Castle	Castle		Killeany (Inishmore)	53°06′17″N 9°39′47″W	
43.04	Temple Benen	Church		Killeany (Inishmore)	53°06′11″N 9°39′59″W	
43.11	Turmartin	Watch Tower		Killeany (Inishmore)	53°05′29″N 9°38′20″W	
43	Oghil Leacht Cuimhne	Leacht Cuimhne (cenotaph for those lost at sea)		Killeany (Inishmore)	53°07′45″N 9°41′25″W	
43	Tighlagh Eany	Church		Killeany (Inishmore)	53°06′05″N 9°39′10″W	
43	Killeany Clacháns	Clocháns		Killeany (Inishmore)	53°06′35″N 9°41′19″W	
43.03	St. Eany's	Early Medieval Ecclesiastical Site		Killeany (Inishmore)	53°06′12″N 9°39′50″W	
43	Doocaher (Black Fort)	Promontory Fort		Killeany (Inishmore)	53°06′16″N 9°41′15″W	
51	Kilmacduagh monastery	Churches & Round Tower		Kilmacduagh	53°02′53″N 8°53′16″W	
43	Temple MacDuagh	Church		Kilmurvy (Inishmore)	53°07′51″N 9°45′33″W	
43.15	Templenaneeve	Church		Kilmurvy (Inishmore)	53°07′51″N 9°45′33″W	
43	Dun Aengus	Promontory Fort		Inishmore	53°07′32″N 9°46′00″W	
43	Clochán na Carraige	Clochán		Kilmurvy (Inishmore)	53°08′32″N 9°45′37″W	
446	Kiltiernan Church	Church & Cashel		Kiltiernan East	53°11′17″N 8°50′34″W	
627	Lackan Ringfort	Ringfort & Souterrain		Lackan (Ardrahan)	53°09′49″N 8°46′56″W	
621	Lissard Ringforts	Two Ringforts & Souterrain		Lissard	53°20′53″N 8°23′22″W	
245	Castlekirk (Hen's Castle)	Castle		Drumsnauv	53°29′33″N 9°30′48″W	
499	Rathsoony	Ringfort		Masonbrook	53°10′30″N 8°30′56″W	
499	Rahannagragh (Rahannagroagh)	Ringfort		Masonbrook	53°10′37″N 8°30′51″W	
609	Merlinpark Castle (Merlin Castle)	Castle		Merlinpark	53°16′47″N 8°59′53″W	
498	The Seven Monuments	Embanked Stone Circle		Moanmore East	53°11′19″N 8°31′52″W	
43	St. Kieran's	Early Medieval Ecclesiastical Site		Oghil (Inishmore)	53°07′55″N 9°41′07″W	
43	St. Soorney's	Church & Enclosure		Oghil (Inishmore)	53°08′01″N 9°41′43″W	
43	Temple an Cheathrair Aluinn	Church & grave		Oghil (Inishmore)	53°07′47″N 9°42′58″W	
43	Oghill	Cashel		Oghil (Inishmore)	53°07′38″N 9°41′59″W	
43	Killeany	Clocháns		Oghil (Inishmore)	53°07′39″N 9°43′08″W	
43	Killeany Tomb	Wedge Tomb		Oghil (Inishmore)	53°07′39″N 9°43′08″W	
43	Onaght	Castle & house site		Onaght (Inishmore)	53°08′24″N 9°46′36″W	
43	Onaght	Clocháns		Onaght (Inishmore)	53°08′32″N 9°45′37″W	
43	Kilcholan Church	Church		Onaght (Inishmore)	53°08′25″N 9°46′33″W	
43	Onaght Cashel	Cashel		Onaght (Inishmore)	53°08′24″N 9°46′36″W	
43	Templebrecan	Early Medieval Ecclesiastical Site		Onaght (Inishmore)	53°08′46″N 9°46′39″W	
231	Killursa	Church		Ower	53°28′04″N 9°08′42″W	
462	Pallas Castle	Castle		Pallas (Tynagh)	53°07′36″N 8°21′44″W	
48	Kilbennen	Church & Round Tower		Pollacorragune	53°32′20″N 8°53′31″W	
461	Portumna Abbey	Friary (Dominican)		Portumna Demesne	53°05′10″N 8°13′03″W	
515	Portumna Castle	Castle		Portumna Demesne	53°05′12″N 8°13′14″W	
46	Roscam	Early Medieval Ecclesiastical Site		Roscam	53°15′51″N 8°59′06″W	
50	Ross Errilly Abbey	Friary (Franciscan)		Headford	53°28′47″N 9°07′54″W	
242	Saint Macdara's Island	Early Medieval Ecclesiastical Site		Saint Macdara's Island	53°18′16″N 9°55′02″W	
643	Tonaroasty	Deserted Medieval Village		Tonaroasty	53°11′36″N 8°32′47″W	
505	Tuam High Cross	High Cross		Tuam	53°30′49″N 8°51′19″W	
431	Pearse's Cottage	House with historic associations		Turlough	53°23′10″N 9°37′12″W	
327	Turoe stone	Sculptured Stone		Bullaun	53°15′10″N 8°33′42″W	
477	Aghaderrard Court Tomb	Court Tomb		Aghaderrard West	54°26′06″N 8°14′20″W	
68	Fenagh Churches	Churches		Fenagh	54°01′05″N 7°50′06″W	
405	Corracloona Court Tomb	Megalithic Tomb		Corracloona	54°20′05″N 8°00′16″W	
69	Creevelea Abbey	Friary (Franciscan)		Creevelea	54°13′53″N 8°18′35″W	
390	Parke's Castle	Castle		Dromahair	54°15′53″N 8°20′04″W	
508	Seán Mac Diarmada's House	House with historical associations		Kiltyclogher		
653	Worm Ditch (Black Pig's Dyke)	Linear Earthwork		Lattone, Gortnaderrary	54°22′45″N 8°04′12″W	
103	Moyne Abbey	Friary (Franciscan)		Abbeylands	54°12′08″N 9°10′37″W	
96	Aghagower Round Tower	Round Tower & Church		Aghagower	53°45′51″N 9°27′54″W	
243	Aghalard Castle	Castle		Aghalahard	53°33′22″N 9°17′56″W	
403	Balla Round Tower	Round Tower		Balla	53°48′18″N 9°07′53″W	
145	Ballina Portal Tomb (Dolmen of the Four Maols)	Portal Tomb		Ballina	54°06′25″N 9°09′57″W	
501	Ballintubber Abbey	Priory (Augustinian)		Ballintubber	53°45′23″N 9°16′58″W	
325	Ballylahan Castle	Castle		Ballylahan	53°56′05″N 9°06′18″W	
251	Ballymacgibbon Cairn	Cairn		Ballymacgibbon North	53°32′32″N 9°14′14″W	
561	Barnacahoge Cashel	Cashel		Barnacahoge	53°54′20″N 8°51′23″W	
530	Boheh Stone	Rock Art		Boheh	53°44′51″N 9°33′14″W	
415	Breastagh Ogham Stone	Ogham Stone		Breastagh	54°14′47″N 9°15′12″W	
244	Caherduff Castle	Castle		Caherduff	53°33′08″N 9°14′41″W	
631	Carbad More	Ringfort		Carbad More	54°14′10″N 9°15′27″W	
246	Eochy's Cairn	Cairn		Carn (Ballinchalla)	53°35′19″N 9°15′48″W	
458	Carrickkildavnet Castle	Castle		Carrickkildavnet	53°52′51″N 9°56′46″W	
293	Carrowcastle Wedge Tomb	Wedge Tomb		Carrowcastle	54°05′41″N 9°04′45″W	
293	Carrowcrom Wedge Tomb	Megalithic Tomb		Carrowcrom	54°05′24″N 9°02′52″W	
196	Murrisk Abbey	Friary (Augustinian)		Murrisk	53°46′55″N 9°38′22″W	
235	Burrishoole Abbey	Friary (Dominican)		Newport	53°53′56″N 9°34′21″W	
483	Cashel Cairn	Cairn / court tomb		Cashel (Kilcummin)	54°15′20″N 9°13′36″W	
222A	Burriscarra Abbey	Friary (Carmelite) & Church		Castlecarra	53°43′52″N 9°14′45″W	
222B	Castle Carra	Castle		Castlecarra	53°43′17″N 9°15′19″W	
432	Cong Abbey	Priory (Augustinian)		Cong	53°32′25″N 9°17′12″W	
308	Templenagalliaghdoo	Church		Errew (Tirawley)	54°03′16″N 9°15′49″W	
307	Errew Abbey	Priory (Augustinian)		Errew (Tirawley)	54°03′11″N 9°15′48″W	
99A	St. Dairbhile's Church	Church		Fallmore	54°05′46″N 10°06′25″W	
146	Glebe Stone Circles	Stone Circles		Glebe (Cong), Nymphstown, Tonaleeaun	53°32′52″N 9°15′54″W	
198	Granuaile's Castle	Castle		Glen (Clare Island)	53°47′59″N 9°57′05″W	
99	Inishglora	Early Medieval Ecclesiastical Site		Inishglora Island	54°12′31″N 10°07′13″W	
379	Inishkea North Island	Early Medieval Ecclesiastical Sites		Inishkea Islands	54°08′00″N 10°11′16″W	
102	Inishmaine Abbey	Priory (Augustinian)		Inishmaine	53°35′53″N 9°18′05″W	
619	Kilcashel Stone Fort	Cashel		Kilcashel	53°53′00″N 8°40′49″W	
402	Kildermot Church (Killdermot Abbey)	Church		Kildermot	54°03′30″N 9°05′25″W	
423	Kildun Standing Stones	Standing Stones		Kildun	53°59′20″N 9°50′24″W	
95A	Kinlough Castle	Castle and church		Kinlough	53°29′55″N 9°06′59″W	
296	Lankill Standing Stone	Standing Stone		Lankill	53°45′12″N 9°30′06″W	
98	Meelick Round Tower	Round Tower		Meelick	53°55′17″N 9°01′12″W	
359	The Gods of the Neale Monument	Monument		Neale Park	53°34′26″N 9°13′28″W	
413	Kelly's Cave	Cave		Nymphsfield	53°32′40″N 9°16′45″W	
664	Bunnadober Mill	Mill Complex		Rahard (Ballinrobe)	53°36′27″N 9°16′04″W	
269	Rathfran Friary	Friary (Dominican)		Rathfran	54°14′17″N 9°14′40″W	
389	Rathfran Stone Circle	Stone circle, mound, ringfort, souterrain & enclosure		Rathfran	54°14′38″N 9°14′24″W	
633	Rathfranpark Wedge Tomb	Wedge Tomb		Rathfranpark	54°14′31″N 9°15′09″W	
454	Rockfleet Castle	Castle		Newport	53°53′46″N 9°37′37″W	
386	Rosdoagh Court Tomb	court tomb		Rosdoagh	54°16′48″N 9°48′05″W	
104	Rosserk Abbey	Friary (Franciscan)		Rosserk	54°10′17″N 9°08′36″W	
95	Shrule Abbey	Church		Shrule	53°31′08″N 9°05′27″W	
172	Strade Abbey	Friary (Dominican)		Strade	53°55′17″N 9°07′44″W	
97	Clare Island Abbey	Church (Cistercian)		Lecarrow (Clare Island)	53°47′36″N 9°59′21″W	
105	Killala Round Tower	Round Tower		Killala	54°12′47″N 9°13′15″W	
100	Turlough Church	Church & Round Tower		Turlough	53°53′19″N 9°12′30″W	
559	Altore Wedge Tomb	Wedge Tomb		Altore	53°42′17″N 8°40′50″W	
488	Ardcarn Mound	Mound & Ringfort		Ardcarn	53°57′42″N 8°12′32″W	
682	Castle Naghten	Motte and Bailey		Ballycreggan	53°27′11″N 8°03′38″W	
362	Roscommon Abbey	Friary (Dominican)		Ballypheasan	53°37′29″N 8°11′30″W	
487	Carnagh West Ringfort	Ringfort		Carnagh West	53°30′48″N 8°02′39″W	
294	Rathcroghan	Archaeological Complex		Tulsk	53°48′07″N 8°18′14″W	
473	Rathcroghan	Archaeological Complex (field system, cashel, enclosures, court tomb etc)		Glenballythomas	53°47′34″N 8°18′18″W	
586	McDermott's Castle	Castle		Castle Island (Lough Key)	53°59′22″N 8°13′57″W	
320	Castlestrange stone	Sculptured Stone		Athleague	53°35′13″N 8°16′19″W	
557	Inchmacnerin Abbey	Priory (Augustinian)		Church Island (Lough Key)	53°59′40″N 8°15′39″W	
181	Roscommon Castle	Castle		Roscommon	53°38′07″N 8°11′36″W	
608	Cloonshanville High Cross	High Cross		Cloonshanville	53°52′03″N 8°23′24″W	
650	Drummin fort	Ringfort & Ogham Stones		Drummin	53°50′04″N 8°22′08″W	
397	Emlagh High Cross	High crosses: two shafts and head fragments		Emlagh	53°44′43″N 8°27′23″W	
167	Boyle Abbey	Abbey (Cistercian)		Knocknashee	53°58′25″N 8°17′49″W	
556	Trinity Abbey	Abbey (Premonstratensian)		Trinity Island (Lough Key)	53°59′21″N 8°15′16″W	
342	Ballinafad Castle	Castle		Ballinafad	54°01′34″N 8°20′09″W	
373	Castlebaldwin Castle	Castle		Castlebaldwin	54°04′41″N 8°22′11″W	
523	Cabragh Wedge Tomb (The Giant's Grave)	Wedge Tomb		Cabragh (Leyny)	54°10′27″N 8°40′26″W	
568	Carns Cairn	Cairn		Carns (Calry)	54°15′20″N 8°27′01″W	
277.01	Carricknagat Megalithic Tombs	Megalithic Tombs		Carricknagat (Tirerrill)	54°11′18″N 8°24′07″W	
518	Carrowkeel Passage Tomb Cemetery	Passage Tomb Cemetery		Carrowkeel	54°03′04″N 8°22′26″W	
153.01	Carrowmore Passage Tomb Cemetery	Stone circle, Ring barrow, Passage tomb, Ringfort, Megalithic structure, Cashel		Carrowmore	54°15′23″N 8°30′56″W	
638	Ballymote Castle	Castle		Ballymote	54°05′15″N 8°31′10″W	
479	Carrowreagh Court Tomb	Court Tomb		Carrowreagh (Leyny)	54°03′36″N 8°56′32″W	
277.02	Cashelore (Cashel Bir, Bawnboy)	Cashel		Castleore	54°12′36″N 8°22′39″W	
118	Church Island	Church		Church Island (Lough Gill)	54°15′13″N 8°23′12″W	
159	Cashelmore (Clogher Stone Fort)	Cashel		Clogher	53°56′04″N 8°30′50″W	
338	Creevykeel Court Tomb	Court Tomb		Creevykeel	54°26′19″N 8°26′00″W	
433	Cummeen Court Tomb	Cairns		Cummeen	54°16′37″N 8°31′36″W	
119	Drumcliffe High Crosses & Round Tower	High Crosses & Round Tower		Drumcliffe	54°19′34″N 8°29′42″W	
277.03	Gortlownan Motte	Motte		Gortlownan	54°13′17″N 8°20′20″W	
607	Gortnaleck Court Tomb	Court Tomb		Gortnaleck	54°23′04″N 8°29′03″W	
152	Heapstown Cairn	Cairn		Heapstown	54°05′42″N 8°20′54″W	
117	Inishmurray Island	Early Medieval Ecclesiastical Site		Inishmurray Island	54°25′54″N 8°39′25″W	
153.02	Knocknarea passage tombs	Passage tombs & Cairns		Knocknarea	54°15′35″N 8°34′28″W	
153.03	Queen Meave's Tomb	Cairn		Knocknarea	54°15′32″N 8°34′29″W	
377	Magheraghanrush Court Tomb	Court Tomb		Magheraghanrush	54°16′46″N 8°22′52″W	
465	Moytirra East Court Tomb	Court Tomb		Moytirra East	54°04′31″N 8°17′01″W	
189	Sligo Abbey	Friary (Dominican)		Sligo	54°16′15″N 8°28′12″W	
