= List of national monuments in County Sligo =

The Irish state has officially approved the following list of national monuments in County Sligo. In the Republic of Ireland, a structure or site may be deemed to be a "national monument", and therefore worthy of state protection, if it is of national importance. If the land adjoining the monument is essential to protect it, this land may also be protected.

== National Monuments ==
| NM# | Monument name | Description | Image | Townland | Location |
|---|---|---|---|---|---|
| 342 | Ballinafad Castle | Castle | | Ballinafad | 54°01′34″N 8°20′09″W |
| 373 | Castlebaldwin Castle | Castle | | Castlebaldwin | 54°04′41″N 8°22′11″W |
| 523 | Cabragh Wedge Tomb (The Giant's Grave) | Wedge Tomb | | Cabragh (Leyny) | 54°10′27″N 8°40′26″W |
| 568 | Carns Cairn | Cairn | | Carns (Calry) | 54°15′20″N 8°27′01″W |
| 277.01 | Carricknagat Megalithic Tombs | Megalithic Tombs | | Carricknagat (Tirerrill) | 54°11′18″N 8°24′07″W |
| 518 | Carrowkeel Passage Tomb Cemetery | Passage Tomb Cemetery | | Carrowkeel | 54°03′04″N 8°22′26″W |
| 153.01 | Carrowmore Passage Tomb Cemetery | Stone circle, Ring barrow, Passage tomb, Ringfort, Megalithic structure, Cashel | | Carrowmore | 54°15′23″N 8°30′56″W |
| 638 | Ballymote Castle | Castle | | Ballymote | 54°05′15″N 8°31′10″W |
| 479 | Carrowreagh Court Tomb | Court Tomb | | Carrowreagh (Leyny) | 54°03′36″N 8°56′32″W |
| 277.02 | Cashelore (Cashel Bir, Bawnboy) | Cashel | | Castleore | 54°12′36″N 8°22′39″W |
| 118 | Church Island | Church | | Church Island (Lough Gill) | 54°15′13″N 8°23′12″W |
| 159 | Cashelmore (Clogher Stone Fort) | Cashel | | Clogher | 53°56′04″N 8°30′50″W |
| 338 | Creevykeel Court Tomb | Court Tomb | | Creevykeel | 54°26′19″N 8°26′00″W |
| 433 | Cummeen Court Tomb | Cairns | | Cummeen | 54°16′37″N 8°31′36″W |
| 119 | Drumcliffe High Crosses & Round Tower | High Crosses & Round Tower | | Drumcliffe | 54°19′34″N 8°29′42″W |
| 277.03 | Gortlownan Motte | Motte | | Gortlownan | 54°13′17″N 8°20′20″W |
| 607 | Gortnaleck Court Tomb | Court Tomb | | Gortnaleck | 54°23′04″N 8°29′03″W |
| 152 | Heapstown Cairn | Cairn | | Heapstown | 54°05′42″N 8°20′54″W |
| 117 | Inishmurray Island | Early Medieval Ecclesiastical Site | | Inishmurray Island | 54°25′54″N 8°39′25″W |
| 153.02 | Knocknarea passage tombs | Passage tombs & Cairns | | Knocknarea | 54°15′35″N 8°34′28″W |
| 153.03 | Queen Meave's Tomb | Cairn | | Knocknarea | 54°15′32″N 8°34′29″W |
| 377 | Magheraghanrush Court Tomb | Court Tomb | | Magheraghanrush | 54°16′46″N 8°22′52″W |
| 465 | Moytirra East Court Tomb | Court Tomb | | Moytirra East | 54°04′31″N 8°17′01″W |
| 189 | Sligo Abbey | Friary (Dominican) | | Sligo | 54°16′15″N 8°28′12″W |

== Sources ==
- National Monuments in County Sligo
