= List of national monuments in County Roscommon =

The Irish state has officially approved the following list of national monuments in County Roscommon. In the Republic of Ireland, a structure or site may be deemed to be a "national monument", and therefore worthy of state protection, if it is of national importance. If the land adjoining the monument is essential to protect it, this land may also be protected.

== National Monuments ==
NM#	Monument name	Description	Image	Townland	Location
559	Altore Wedge Tomb	Wedge Tomb		Altore	53°42′17″N 8°40′50″W
488	Ardcarn Mound	Mound & Ringfort		Ardcarn	53°57′42″N 8°12′32″W
682	Castle Naghten	Motte and Bailey		Ballycreggan	53°27′11″N 8°03′38″W
362	Roscommon Abbey	Friary (Dominican)		Ballypheasan	53°37′29″N 8°11′30″W
487	Carnagh West Ringfort	Ringfort		Carnagh West	53°30′48″N 8°02′39″W
294	Rathcroghan	Archaeological Complex		Tulsk	53°48′07″N 8°18′14″W
473	Rathcroghan	Archaeological Complex (field system, cashel, enclosures, court tomb etc)		Glenballythomas	53°47′34″N 8°18′18″W
586	McDermott's Castle	Castle		Castle Island (Lough Key)	53°59′22″N 8°13′57″W
320	Castlestrange stone	Sculptured Stone		Athleague	53°35′13″N 8°16′19″W
557	Inchmacnerin Abbey	Priory (Augustinian)		Church Island (Lough Key)	53°59′40″N 8°15′39″W
181	Roscommon Castle	Castle		Roscommon	53°38′07″N 8°11′36″W
608	Cloonshanville High Cross	High Cross		Cloonshanville	53°52′03″N 8°23′24″W
650	Drummin fort	Ringfort & Ogham Stones		Drummin	53°50′04″N 8°22′08″W
397	Emlagh High Cross	High crosses: two shafts and head fragments		Emlagh	53°44′43″N 8°27′23″W
167	Boyle Abbey	Abbey (Cistercian)		Knocknashee	53°58′25″N 8°17′49″W
556	Trinity Abbey	Abbey (Premonstratensian)		Trinity Island (Lough Key)	53°59′21″N 8°15′16″W

== Sources ==
- National Monuments in State Care: Ownership & Guardianship, County Roscommon
