= Derryhiveny Castle =

Tower house in County Galway, Ireland

- Caisleán Dhoire Shuibhne (Irish)
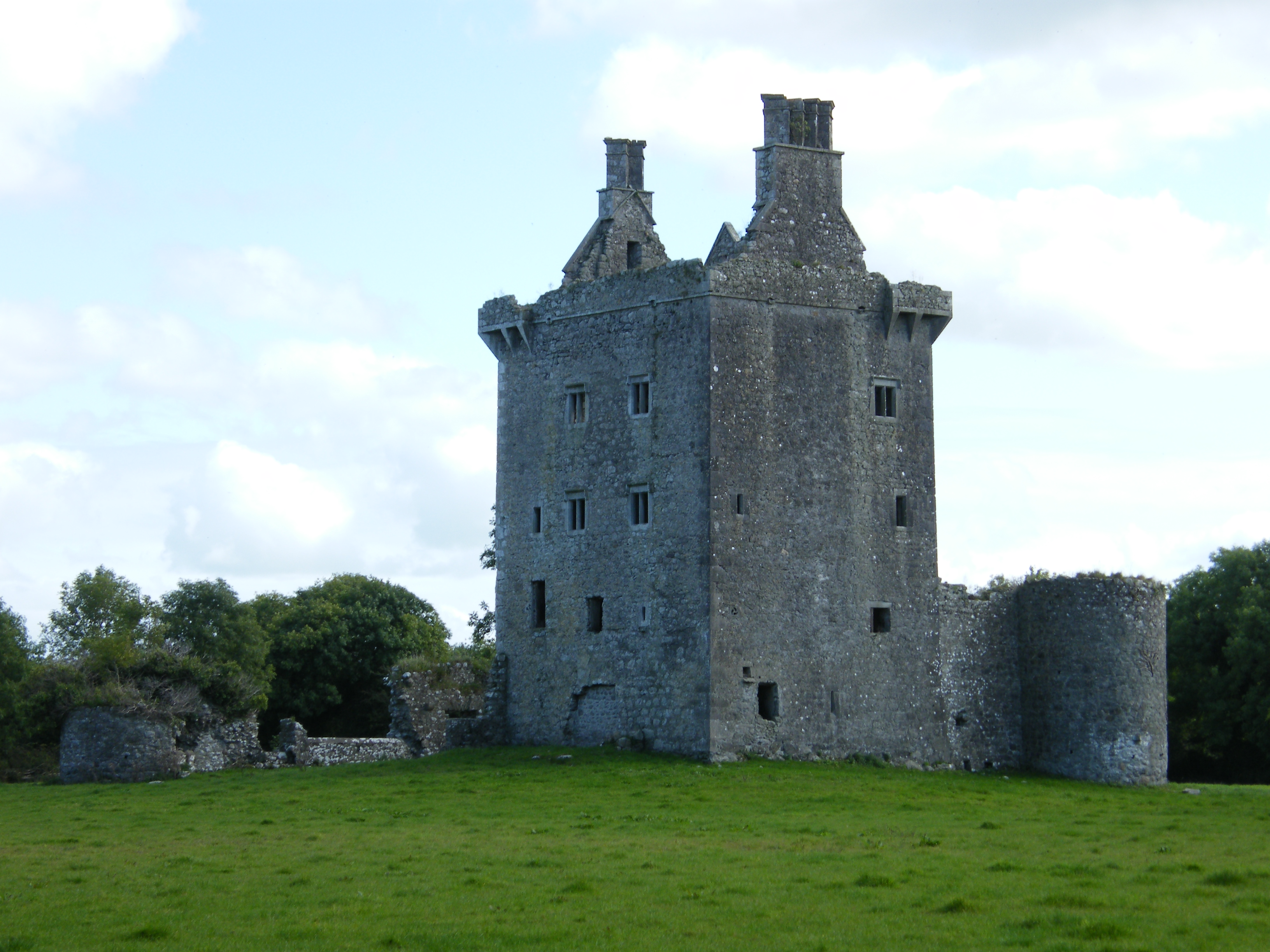

- Location within Ireland
- 53.1271°N 8.1924°W
- Type: tower house
- Location: Derryhiveny South, Portumna, County Galway, Ireland

History
- Built: 1643

Site notes
- Owner: State

National monument of Ireland
- Official name: Derryhiveny Castle
- Reference no.: 283

Derryhiveny Castle is a tower house and National Monument located in County Galway, Ireland.

== Location ==
Derryhiveny Castle is located 4.4 km (2.7 mi) northeast of Portumna, on the west bank of the Shannon.

== History ==
The O'Madden family held the lands around Derryhivenny from c. AD 950 until the middle of the seventeenth century. On 5 February 1639, the head of the family, John O'Madden died, leaving his lands to his son, Daniel O'Madden. Daniel then set about building himself a tower house, around 1643. Its date is known from an inscription on one of its bartizan corbels: D:O'M ME:FIERI:FECIT 1643.

== Description ==
Derryhiveny Castle is a tower house of four storeys. There are vaults on all four storeys. The upper rooms have two- and three-mullioned windows with fireplaces, including one with a chamfered lintel, curved downwards at each end and covered by a chamfered cornice.

There are also remains of a bawn, wall walk and crenellations.
