= Dún Fearbhaí =

- Doonfarvagh; Doonfarbagh; Dún Mur; Dún an Mhothair; Dun Moher; Fearboy's Fort; The Small Fort
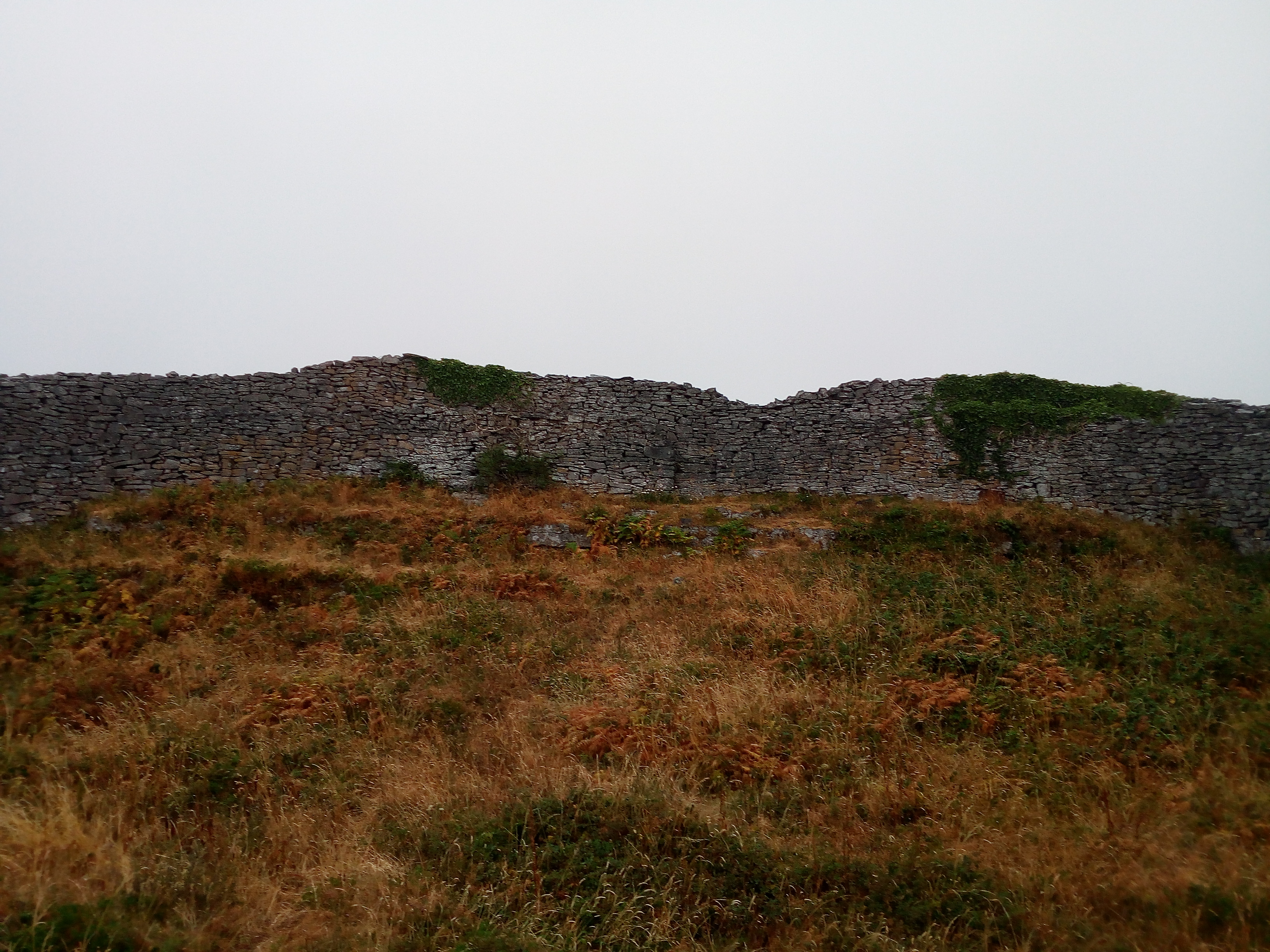
- Stone walls of Dún Fearbhaí

- Location within Ireland
- 53.080686°N 9.580071°W
- Type: stone ringfort
- Location: Carrownlisheen, Inishmaan, County Galway, Ireland

History
- Built: c. AD 1–1000?

Site notes
- Elevation: 57 m (187 ft)
- Height: 5 m (16 ft)
- Area: 900 m^{2} (0.22 acres)
- Architectural style: Gaelic Ireland
- Owner: State

National monument of Ireland
- Official name: Doonfarvagh
- Reference no.: 42

Dún Fearbhaí (pronounced [ˌd̪ˠuːnˠ ˈfʲaɾˠəwiː]) is a stone ringfort (cashel) and national monument located on Inishmaan, one of the Aran Islands, Ireland.

View from Dún Fearbhaí, overlooking the Old Harbour.

== Location ==
Dún Fearbhaí is located on the eastern edge of Inishmaan, facing back toward Galway Bay.

== History ==
The fort is believed to date from the 1st millennium AD, some placing it around the 9th century. Its rectilinear shape and unusual structure have led to the belief that it is later than the other Aran Islands forts like Dún Conor, and perhaps contemporary with Dún Formna on Inisheer.

The name Dún Mur is believed to have the same derivation as the Cliffs of Moher, which are named after an old promontory fort called Moher, which once stood on Hag's Head. The name Dún Fearbhaí takes its name from the surrounding area An Fhearbach, "abounding in cattle."

== Description ==
Dún Fearbhaí is a stone ringfort (cashel) shaped like a square with rounded corners; it contains two walls and one terrace built on a steep incline, and also four sets of internal stairs. The walls are up to 4 m (13 ft) high and up to 3 m (9.8 ft) thick, and measure about 27 m (89 ft) by 23 m (75 ft) internally. There is a single entrance in the east, 2 m (6 ft 7 in) wide. O’Driscoll wrote, "A thick wall would have been necessary for larger, higher walls, resulting in excessive labour and resource costs. This was partly alleviated by terracing the walls, reducing the amount of material used. Terracing of the inner face and incorporation of steps allowed access to the top of the wall, permitting occupants expansive visibility of the immediate environs as well as a strategic advantage over approaching attackers. The vertical walls that met attackers or visitors would have been an impressive barrier that provided practical defence for the occupants, as well status."

=== Looped walk ===
The Lúb Dún Fearbhaí is a 13-kilometre looped walk across the island, named after the fort.
