= Caheravoley Fort =

Ringfort in County Galway, Ireland

- Cathair Dhá Bhuaile (Irish)
- Caherancola
- Location within Ireland
- 53.418843°N 8.908063°W
- Type: ringfort
- Periods: Early Christian Ireland
- Associated with: Gaelic Irish
- Location: Kilcahill,Annaghdown, County Galway, Ireland

History
- Built: 6th–12th century

Site notes
- Material: earth
- Elevation: 40 m (130 ft)
- Area: 0.26 ha (0.64 acres)
- Diameter: 56 m (184 ft)
- Owner: State
- Public access: yes

National monument of Ireland
- Official name: Caheravoley
- Reference no.: 369

Caheravoley Fort is a ringfort (rath) and bawn forming a national monument located in County Galway, Ireland.

== Location ==
Caheravoley lies 3.6 km (2.2 mi) southwest of Corofin, County Galway in the townland of Kilcahill in Annaghdown Parish. It is situated west of the River Clare.

== History ==
Caheravoley was built in the early Christian era. It was used as a protected farmstead, as indicated by the name: cathair dhá bhuaile, "circular fort of two milking-places." Cattle were grazed on the surrounding land, then brought into the fort for milking and to protect from thieves.

== Description ==
A round ringfort with protective ditch and souterrain, with an entrance in the north end.
