= Pallas Castle =

- Caisleán na Pailíse (Irish)
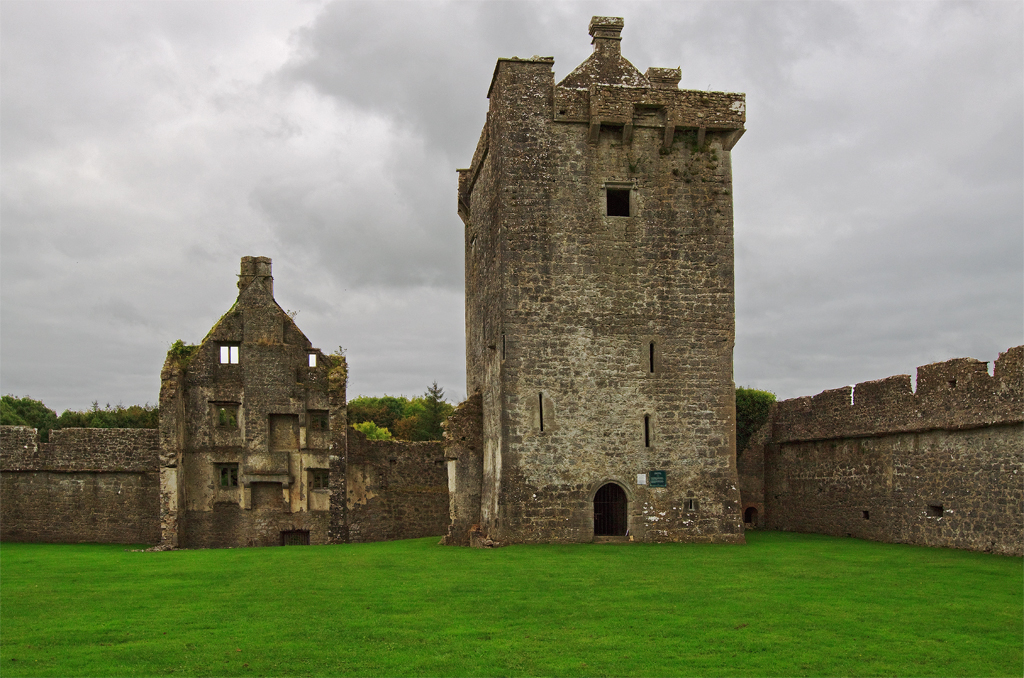

- Location within Ireland
- 53.126574°N 8.362318°W
- Type: tower house
- Location: Pallas, Tynagh, County Galway, Ireland

History
- Built: c. 1500

Site notes
- Owner: State

National monument of Ireland
- Official name: Pallas Castle
- Reference no.: 462

Pallas Castle is a tower house and National Monument located in County Galway, Ireland. According to visitgalway.ie, it is "one of the best-preserved examples of a tower house in Ireland", surrounded as it is by a bawn wall with four corner towers and a gatehouse.

== Location ==
Pallas Castle is located to the west of Pallas House, 2.8 km (1.7 mi) south of Tynagh, 1.6 km (1 mile) north of the Duniry River.

== History ==
The castle was built by the Burkes c. 1500. In 1574 it was owned by Jonyck Fitzthomas Burke, but after the restoration it passed to the Nugent Earls of Westmeath. Near the tower at the west end, there is a rectangular flanker, an 18th-century malt house and the remains of a large 17th-century gabled house. Some buildings in the southwest corner probably date from the 19th century. The Burke family name lives on with the Burke family descendants living down the road and in surrounding areas.

== Building ==
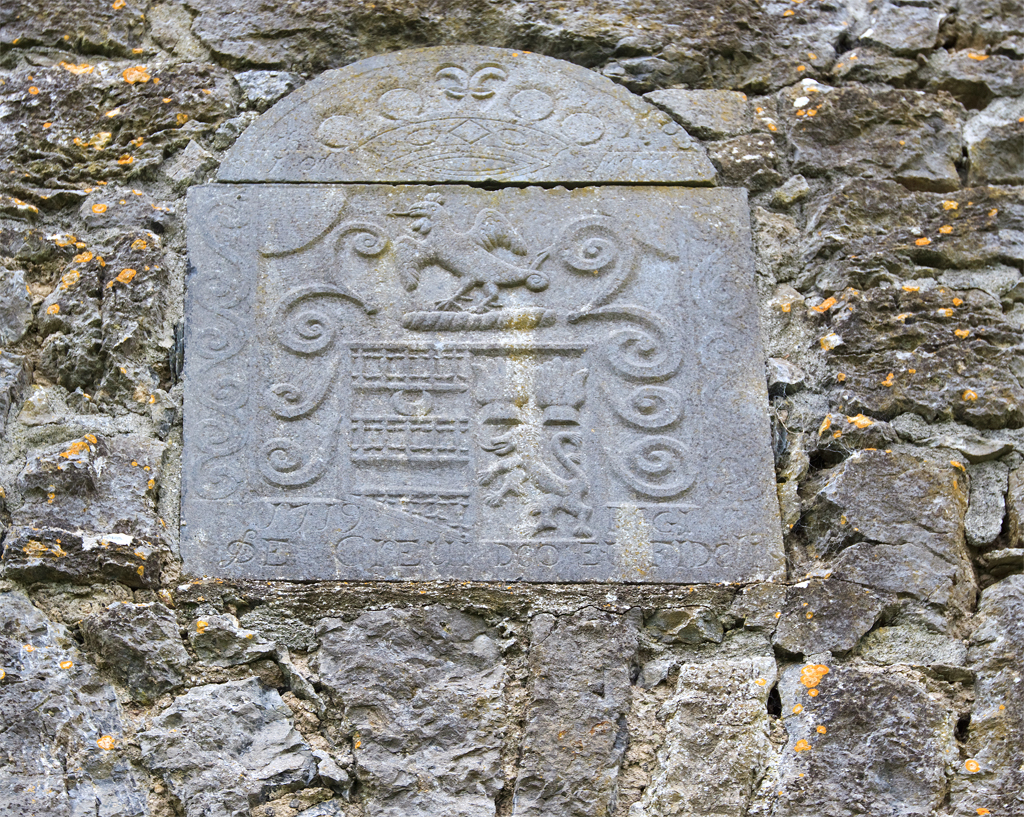
Armorial plaque

The tower is 5 storeys high, with the third storey vaulted. The thick end wall contains a tier of mural chambers and a winding stair.

There are a number of good fireplaces preserved on the various floors.

The fourth floor has attractive mullioned windows framed in arches. The roof was still thatched in the early part of the 20th century, the bottom being covered with stone flags for protection.

The tower is surrounded by a well-preserved bawn, entered via a two-storey gatehouse. The bawn has two towers with turrets at each corner, and has internal steps and parapets.
