= Rahannagragh =

Ringfort and national monument in County Galway, Ireland

- Rahannagroagh
- Location within Ireland
- 53.176949°N 8.514203°W
- Type: ringfort
- Location: Masonbrook, Loughrea, County Galway, Ireland

History
- Built: 1st–9th century AD

Site notes
- Elevation: 106 m (348 ft)
- Area: 0.11 ha (0.27 acres)

National monument of Ireland
- Official name: Rahannagragh
- Reference no.: 499

Rahannagragh is a ringfort and national monument located in County Galway, Ireland.

== Location ==
Rahannagragh is located 4.2 km (2.6 miles) southeast of Loughrea.

== History and description ==
Rahannagragh is surrounded by a ditch and a bank.
