= Rathfran Stone Circle =

- Liagchiorcal Ráth Bhrannaibh (Irish)
- Location within Ireland
- 54.243797°N 9.240098°W
- Type: stone circle
- Location: Rathfran, Killala, County Mayo, Ireland

History
- Built: c. 2500 BC

National monument of Ireland
- Official name: Rathfran Stone Circle
- Reference no.: 389

Rathfran Stone Circle is a stone circle and National Monument located in County Mayo, Ireland.

== Location ==
Rathfran Stone Circle is located to the west of Killala Bay, northeast of Summerhill House.

== History ==
The stone circles were built c. 2500 BC.

== Description ==
=== Northeast circle ===
The main circle is 18 m (59 ft) in diameter. It is composed of 16 stones. Many of the stones are large blocks up to 1.5 m (5 ft) high.

=== Southwest circle ===
Consists of 8 stones on a raised platform.
