= Barnacahoge Cashel =

- Caiseal Cluain Meirg (Irish)
- Location within Ireland
- 53.905452°N 8.856397°W
- Type: stone ringfort
- Location: Barnacahoge, Swinford, County Mayo, Ireland

History
- Built: c. AD 700

Site notes
- Elevation: 136 m (446 ft)

National monument of Ireland
- Official name: Barnacahoge Cashel
- Reference no.: 561

Barnacahoge Cashel, is a stone ringfort (cashel) and National Monument located in County Mayo, Ireland.

== Location ==
Barnacahoge Cashel is located on a hill immediately west of Ireland West Airport.

== History ==
Barnacahoge Cashel was constructed in early Christian period (7th or 8th century AD) and may have been inhabited as late as the 18th century. Within the shelter of these stone walls were thatched dwellings of mud and wattle, and pens into which livestock could have been herded when threatened by enemies.

It was rediscovered in 1976–77.

== Description ==
Encircling the flat summit are the remains of a wall 1.5 m (4 ft 11 in) thick and 16 m (52 ft) in diameter.
