= Carrowcrom Wedge Tomb =

Gallery grave in County Mayo, Ireland

- Tuama Dinge na Ceathrún Croime (Irish)
- Dermot & Grania's Bed
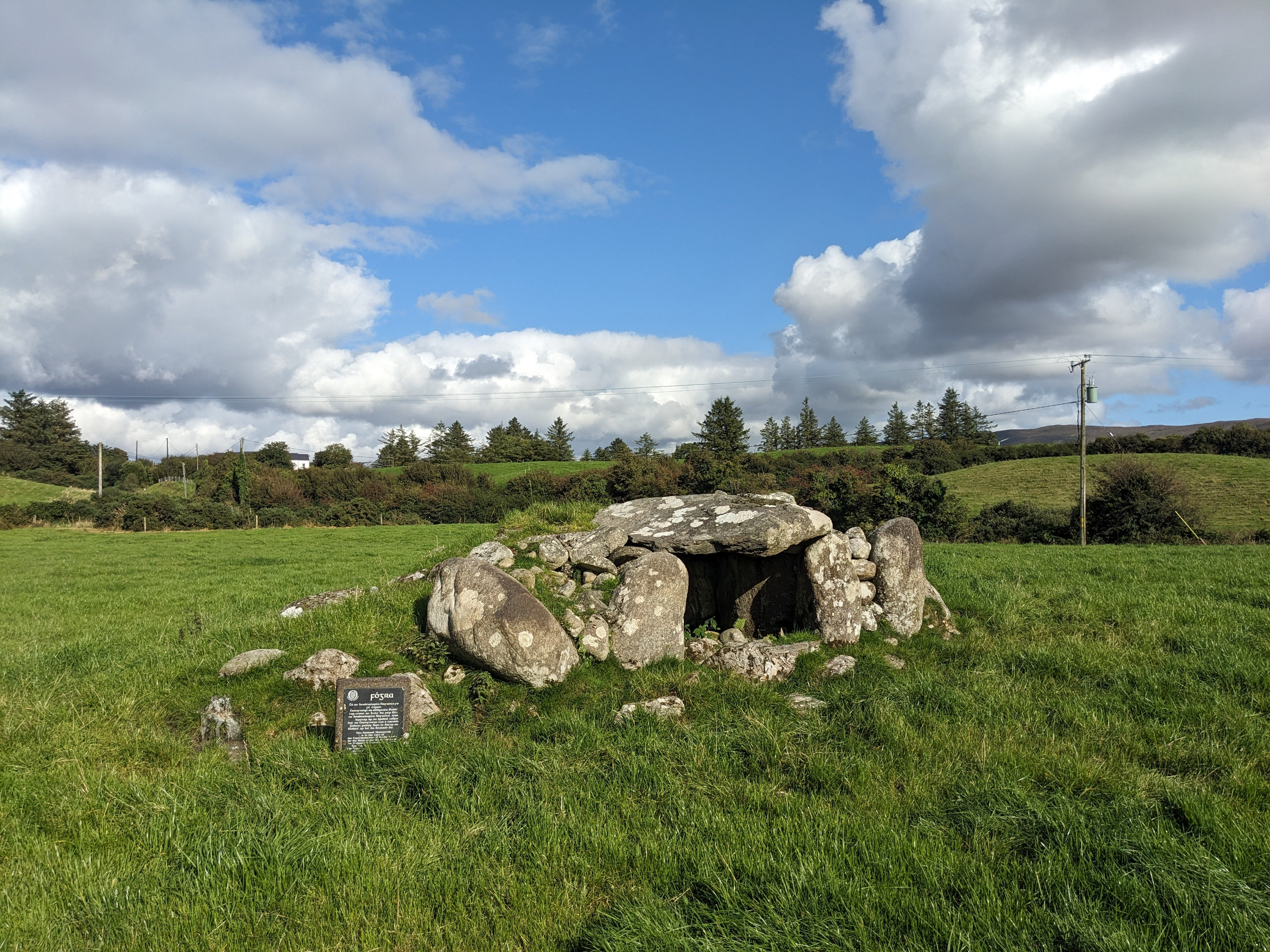

- Location within Ireland
- 54.089952°N 9.047893°W
- Type: wedge-shaped gallery grave
- Location: Carrowcrom, Ballina, County Mayo, Ireland

History
- Built: c. 2500 – 2000 BC

Site notes
- Elevation: 43 m (141 ft)
- Height: 1.5 m (4 ft 11 in)
- Owner: State

National monument of Ireland
- Official name: Carrowcrom Wedge Tomb; Carrowcrom Megalithic Tomb; Carrowcrom Cairn; Carrowcrom Standing Stone; Carrowcrom Standing Stone
- Reference no.: 293

Carrowcrom Wedge Tomb is a wedge-shaped gallery grave and National Monument located in County Mayo, Ireland.

== Location ==
Carrowcrom Wedge Tomb is located 7 km (4.3 mi) east-southeast of Ballina town, to the west of Slieve Gamph, in the upper reaches of the Srufaungal River.

== History ==
This wedge tomb was built c. 2500 – 2000 BC, in the Copper or Bronze Age.

== Description ==
Partially renovated. The wedge-shaped gallery is 3.1 metres (10 ft) long and 1.3 metres (4 ft 3 in) wide, orthostats either side. Two roof stones completely cover the gallery. The whole structure is still covered by a U-shaped cairn.

It faces southwest, towards the setting sun.
