= Arkin's Castle =

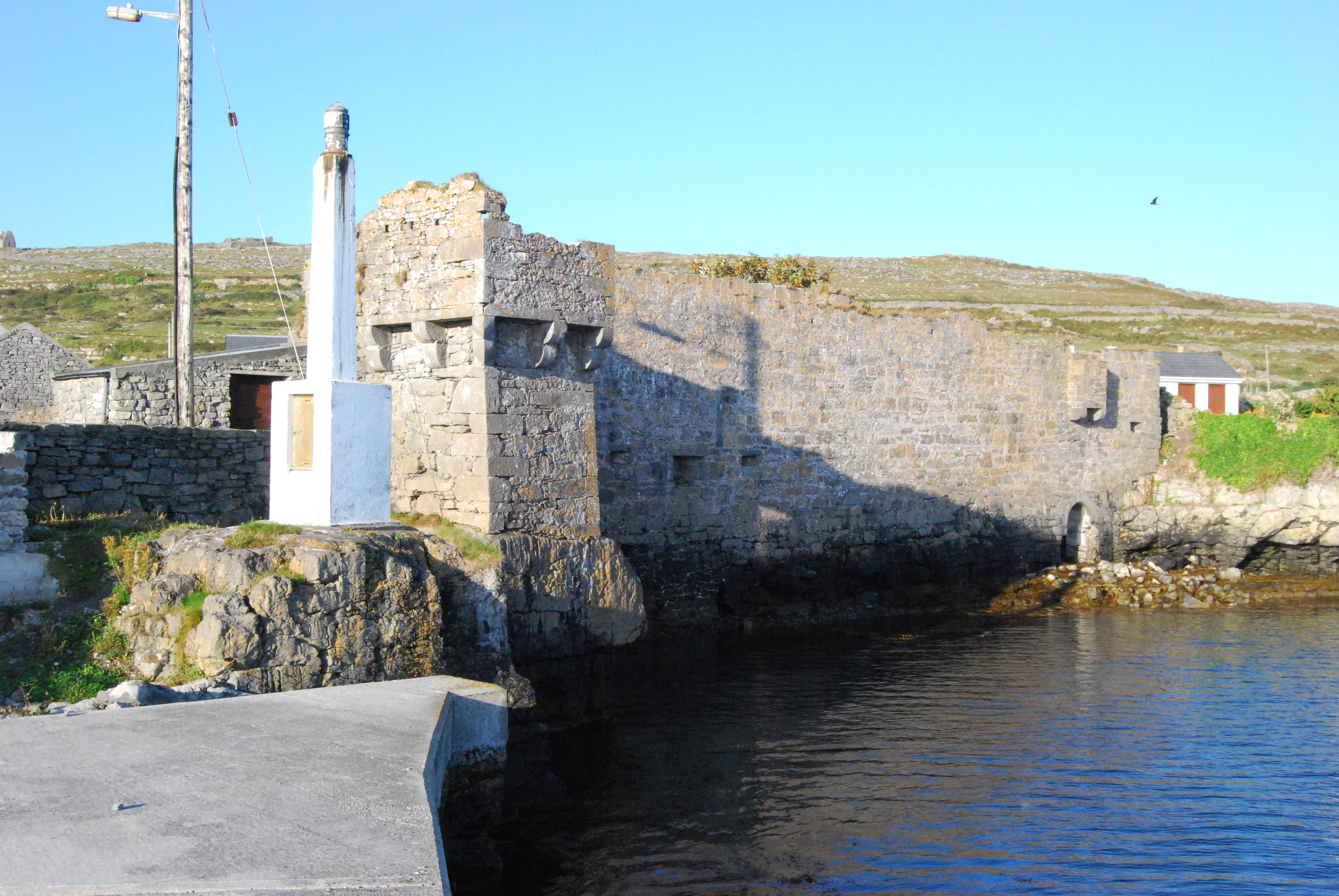

- Location within Ireland

General information
- Location: Ireland
- Coordinates: 53.105059°N 9.662726°W

Arkin's Castle (Irish: Caisleán Aircín) is a 13th-century ruined castle on the island of Inishmore, County Galway, Ireland. It is owned by the Department of Climate, Energy and the Environment of Ireland.

== History ==
Likely built by the O'Brien family in the 1200s, it passed through various owners in the 16th and 17th centuries, including Teige Ó Flaithbheartaigh in 1607. By the 1650s, the original structure had been demolished and a new, enlarged fort was built for Oliver Cromwell, where he stationed soldiers throughout the 1660s. Since the 1700s, it has been uninhabited. Today the ruins include part of a wall and water-gate to the north, a tower at the south-east corner, and a bartizan.

The castle is listed on the Record of Monuments and Places as GA119-005---- and National Monument number 43.01.
