= The Seven Monuments =

- Na Seacht Séadchomhartha (Irish)
- Moanmore East Stone Circle, Masonbrook Ring
- Location within Ireland
- 53.185870°N 8.521743°W
- Type: stone circle
- Location: Moanmore East, Loughrea, County Galway, Ireland

History
- Built: c. 2500–500 BC

National monument of Ireland
- Official name: Moanmore East
- Reference no.: 498

The Seven Monuments is an embanked stone circle and National Monument located in County Galway, Ireland.

== Location ==
The stones stand by the roadside about 3.4 km (2 miles) southeast of Loughrea.

== History ==
The Seven Monuments were erected c. 2500–500 BC.

== Description ==
The Seven Monuments are an embanked stone circle with central cairn. The mound is 2 m (6 ft 7 in) high and 22 m (72 ft) across and each of the seven stones is a pillar 1 m (3 ft 3 in) high and 25 cm (9.8 in) thick.

Nearby is a terraced mound which may have been an assembly-place.
