= Lackan Ringfort =

Archaeological site in Ireland

- Ráth Leacáin (Irish)
- Location within Ireland
- 53.163712°N 8.782293°W
- Type: ringfort
- Location: Lackan, Ardrahan, County Galway, Ireland

Site notes
- Elevation: 37 m (121 ft)
- Area: 1.15 ha (2.8 acres)

National monument of Ireland
- Official name: Lacken
- Reference no.: 627

Lackan Ringfort is a ringfort and national monument located in County Galway, Ireland.

== Location ==
Lackan Ringfort is located 1.8 km (1.1 miles) northeast of Ardrahan.

== History and description ==
Lackan Ringfort is a trivallate ringfort (rath) with souterrain.
