= Kildun Standing Stones =

Bronze age monument in County Mayo, Ireland

- Galláin Chill Ghoin (Irish)
- Location within Ireland
- 53.988664°N 9.839678°W
- Type: Standing stones
- Location: Kildun, Ballycroy, County Mayo, Ireland

History
- Built: 2000 BC?

Site notes
- Elevation: 23 m (75 ft)

National monument of Ireland
- Official name: Kildun Standing Stones
- Reference no.: 423

Kildun Standing Stones are standing stones, forming a National Monument, located in County Mayo, Ireland.

== Location ==
Kildun Standing Stones are located 4 km (2.5 mi) south-southwest of Ballycroy. Unusually for the area, they are on an east-facing slope and Achill Island is not visible from the site.

== History ==
The standing stones were erected perhaps in the Bronze Age. The "cross pillar" was later Christianised by having a cross pattée carved in a circle on the west face.

== Description ==
=== Cross pillar ===
This is a pillar, 1.6 m (5 ft 3 in) tall, with a cross pattée in false relief carved on it, in a circular frame.

=== Stone ===
An undecorated standing stone.
