= Tonaroasty =

Abandoned village in County Galway, Ireland

- Tóin an Róistigh (Irish)
- Location within Ireland
- 53.193407°N 8.546418°W
- Type: Abandoned village
- Location: Tonaroasty, Loughrea, County Galway, Ireland

National monument of Ireland
- Official name: Tonaroasty
- Reference no.: 643

Tonaroasty is an abandoned village and national monument located in County Galway, Ireland.

== Location ==
Tonaroasty is located 1.6 km (1 mile) east of Loughrea.
