= Caherduff Castle =

Tower house near Cong, County Mayo, Ireland

- Caisleán na Cathrach Duibhe (Irish)
- Location within Ireland
- 53.552185°N 9.244741°W
- Type: tower house
- Location: Caherduff, Cong, County Mayo, Ireland

Site notes
- Owner: State

National monument of Ireland
- Official name: Caherduff Castle
- Reference no.: 244

Caherduff Castle (Irish: An Chathair Dhubh) is a tower house and National Monument located near Cong, Ireland.

== Location ==
Caherduff Castle is located north of Lough Corrib, 2.1 km (1.3 mi) northwest of Cross, County Mayo.

== History ==
Caherduff Castle was acquired by the Irish state in 1918.
