= Rosdoagh Court Tomb =

Rosdoagh Stone Circle
- Liagchiorcal Ros Dumhach (Irish)
- Druid's Circle; Rosdoagh Court Tomb/Cairn
- Location within Ireland
- 54.280103°N 9.801466°W
- Type: court cairn
- Location: Rosdoagh, Rossport, County Mayo, Ireland

History
- Built: c. 4000–2500 BC

National monument of Ireland
- Official name: Rosdoagh Stone Circle
- Reference no.: 386

Rosdoagh Stone Circle is a court cairn and National Monument located in County Mayo, Ireland.

== Location ==
- Rosdoagh Court Tomb is located 700 m (2,300 ft) southwest of Rossport, near the mouth of the Glenamoy River.

== History ==
- The court cairn was built in the Neolithic Age. It was originally recorded as a "druid's circle" as it appears to the casual observer to be two concentric rings, however it is today recognised as a court cairn.
- On older maps, it is labeled "Stone Circle", but the current classification is court tomb.

== Description ==
- Rosdoagh is a large court cairn, with a near-circular kerb of 33 stones.
- It once supported a cairn about 18 m (59 ft) in diameter, with sixteen stones surviving from a large central court, with a diameter of about 9 m (30 ft). A short gallery, orientated roughly SSE-NNW, opens to the court at the SSE.
- An oval bank surrounds the whole court cairn, about 27 m × 20 m (30 yd × 22 yd).
