= Carbad More =

- An Carbad Mór (Irish)
- Location within Ireland
- 54.236138°N 9.257463°W
- Type: double court cairn
- Location: Carbad More, Killala, County Mayo, Ireland

History
- Built: c. 4000–3500 BC

Site notes
- Elevation: 12 m (39 ft)

National monument of Ireland
- Official name: Carbad More
- Reference no.: 631

Carbad More is a double court cairn and National Monument located in County Mayo, Ireland.

== Location ==
Carbad More is located 3.6 km (2.2 mi) northwest of Killala village.

== History ==
The double court cairn was possibly constructed c. 4000–3500 BC.

== Description ==
Carbad More is a double court cairn, with the main axis running NE-SW. Both galleries are covered in thick vegetation, the south west court has 10 stones on site forming the portal into the gallery. At either end of the remains of a cairn are the remnants of two almost circular courts, each leading into its own segmented gallery. The larger court is about 7.6 m (25 ft) in diameter.
