= Killeany =

Killeany Cill Éinne
- Civil parish
- Location in Ireland
- Coordinates: 53.045264°N 9.247422°W
- Country: Ireland
- Province: Munster
- County: County Clare
- Time zone: UTC+0 (WET)
  - Summer (DST): UTC-1 (IST (WEST))

Killeany or Kilhenny, Kilheny (Irish: Cill Éinne) is a civil parish in County Clare, Ireland. It lies in the Burren region of the northwest of the county.

== Location ==
Killeany is named for Saint Eaney, who died about 540. It is in the barony of Burren, about 4.5 miles (7.2 km) northwest of Kilfenora. The parish is 3.25 by 2 miles (5.23 by 3.22 km) and covers 3,306 acres (1,338 ha), mostly moorland. There is some rich grazing land, and limestone makes the soil very fertile. There is a cave named Poul Ilva that is over 150 feet (46 m) in depth. A stream runs through the bottom of the cave, emerging above ground about 2 miles (3.2 km) distant near the old parish church.

In 1841 the population was 520 in 92 houses. The main hamlet was Toomaghera, the site of the Roman Catholic chapel.

== Antiquities ==
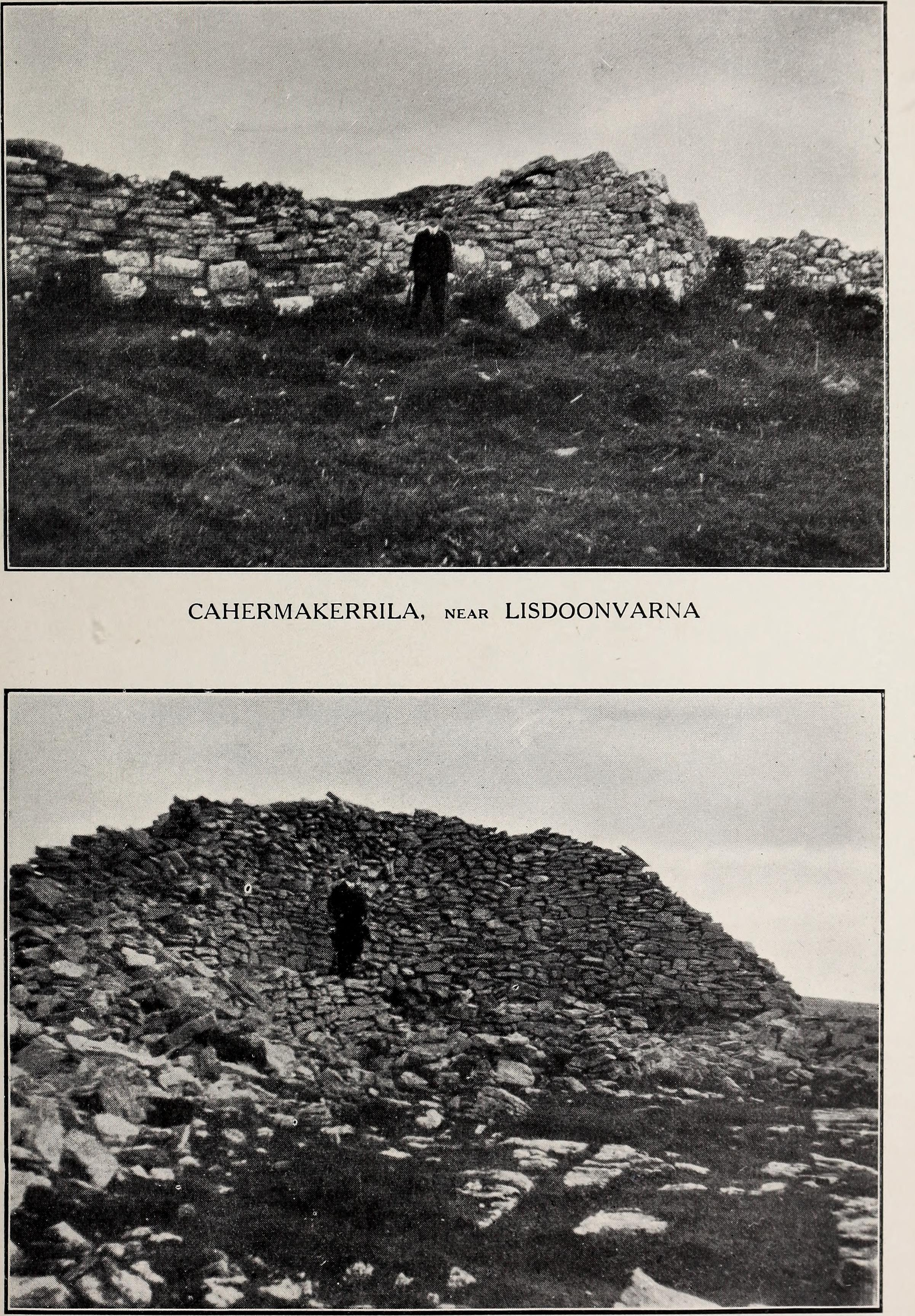
Cahermakerrilla

There are three cahers, or stone ringforts, each very dilapidated. They are Cahermakerrilla, Cahermaan, and Caher-na-teinné (the fort of the fire) in the townland of Lislarheenbeg. The remains of a cromlech stand in Cooleamore. There is a holy well dedicated to Saint Colman mac Duagh in the townland of Cahermakerrilla.

The original church has disappeared, The ruins of its replacement, built around 1300, were still in good repair in 1897. It contained a nave and choir separated by a fine arch. A stone in the wall of the roofless Catholic chapel of Toomaghera bears the inscription, "I. H. S. Pray for me Mortaugh Flanagan, priest of this parish, who built this altar in the year 1700." There is another stone built into the wall on which crucifixion has been carved with some skill.

== Townlands ==
Townlands are Ballyconnoe North, Ballyconnoe South, Ballygastell, Cahermaan (sometimes spelled Cahermane or Cahirmane), Cahermakerrila, Cooleamore, Killeany, Lislarheenbeg and Slievenabillog.
