= Cloonigny Castle =

Ruined tower house in County Galway, Ireland

- Location within Ireland
- 53.355°N 8.3546°W
- Type: tower house
- Location: Cloonigny, Ballinasloe, County Galway, Ireland

Site notes
- Owner: State

National monument of Ireland
- Official name: Cloonigny Castle
- Reference no.: 563

Cloonigny Castle is a ruined tower house and moated site in the townland of Cloonigny in County Galway, Ireland. The castle site, which is a protected national monument, is 4 km (2½ miles) northeast of Kilconnell.

== History ==
Cloonigny Castle, now in ruins, with its moated site, was occupied by Shane De Moy (O'Kelly) in 1574.

While only the foundations of the tower house remain, the site is surrounded by a well-preserved moated site, defined by two banks with an intervening fosse. The inner bank is well preserved and there is a mound defined by a scarp and an external fosse. Close by is a ringfort containing a souterrain.
