= Kilcornan, County Galway =

Deserted medieval village in Galway, Ireland

Kilcornan
- Cill Chornáin (Irish)
- Location within Ireland
- 53.313342°N 8.713583°W
- Type: Abandoned village
- Location: Kilcornan, Athenry, County Galway, Ireland

History
- Abandoned: late 18th century?

National monument of Ireland
- Official name: Kilcornan
- Reference no.: 642

Kilcornan is an abandoned village and national monument located in County Galway, Ireland.

== Location ==
Kilcornan is located 2.5 km (1½ mile) northeast of Athenry.

== History and archaeology ==
Kilcornan was abandoned around the late 18th century. The field layouts and walls are clearly visible on aerial photographs.
