= Cashel Cairn =

- Carn an Chaisil (Irish)
- Location within Ireland
- 54.255556°N 9.226667°W
- Type: cairn
- Location: Cashel, Kilcummin, County Mayo, Ireland

History
- Built: 4000–2500 BC

Site notes
- Elevation: 28 m (92 ft)
- Area: 1,180 m^{2} (12,700 sq ft)

National monument of Ireland
- Official name: Cashel Cairn
- Reference no.: 483

Cashel Cairn is a cairn and National Monument located in County Mayo, Ireland.

== Location ==
Cashel Cairn is 4.8 km (3.0 mi) north of Killala, west of Killala Bay.
