= Rathfranpark Wedge Tomb =

Ancient tomb in County Mayo, Ireland

- Tuama Dinge Pháirc Ráth Bhrannaibh
- The tomb in 2016

- Location within Ireland
- 54.242008°N 9.252568°W
- Type: wedge-shaped gallery grave
- Location: Rathfranpark, Killala, County Mayo, Ireland

History
- Built: c. 2250 BC

Site notes
- Height: 1.8 m (5 ft 11 in)
- Length: 3 m (9.8 ft)
- Width: 2 m (6 ft 7 in)

National monument of Ireland
- Official name: Rathfranpark Wedge Tomb
- Reference no.: 633

The Rathfranpark Wedge Tomb is a wedge-shaped gallery grave and National Monument located in County Mayo, Ireland.

== Location ==
Rathfranpark Wedge Tomb is located 4 km (2.5 mi) northwest of Killala village, overlooking the Palmerstown River, Killala Bay and the Ox Mountains in County Sligo.

== History ==
This wedge tomb was built c. 2500–2000 BC, in the Copper or Bronze Age.

A stone circle once stood close to the tomb until the 1950s, when the stones were uprooted and dumped onto the wedge tomb.

== Description ==
The tomb has a gallery over 3 m (9.8 ft) long and 2 m (6 ft 7 in) wide, with side walls composed of boulders up to 1.8 m (5 ft 11 in) high. The gallery axis is ENE-WSW, so the ENE end points towards the rising sun at the summer solstice.
