= Carrowcastle Wedge Tomb =

Gallery grave in County Mayo, Ireland

- Tuama Dinge Cheathrú an Chaisleáin (Irish)
- Location within Ireland
- 54.094797°N 9.079134°W
- Type: wedge-shaped gallery grave
- Location: Carrowcastle, Bohola, County Mayo, Ireland

History
- Built: c. 2500 – 2000 BC

Site notes
- Elevation: 32 m (105 ft)
- Owner: State

National monument of Ireland
- Official name: Carrowcastle Wedge Tomb
- Reference no.: 293

Carrowcastle Wedge Tomb is a wedge-shaped gallery grave and National Monument located in County Mayo, Ireland.

== Location ==
Carrowcastle Wedge Tomb is located 5 km (3.1 mi) southeast of Ballina village, to the west of Slieve Gamph.

== History ==
This wedge tomb was built c. 2500 – 2000 BC, in the Copper or Bronze Age.

== Description ==
The round capstone sits above a small gallery. There is much cairn material and the remains of a mound visible.
