= Doorus Demesne wedge tomb =

Doorus Demesne Wedge Tomb
- Tuama Dinge Dhiméin Dhúrois
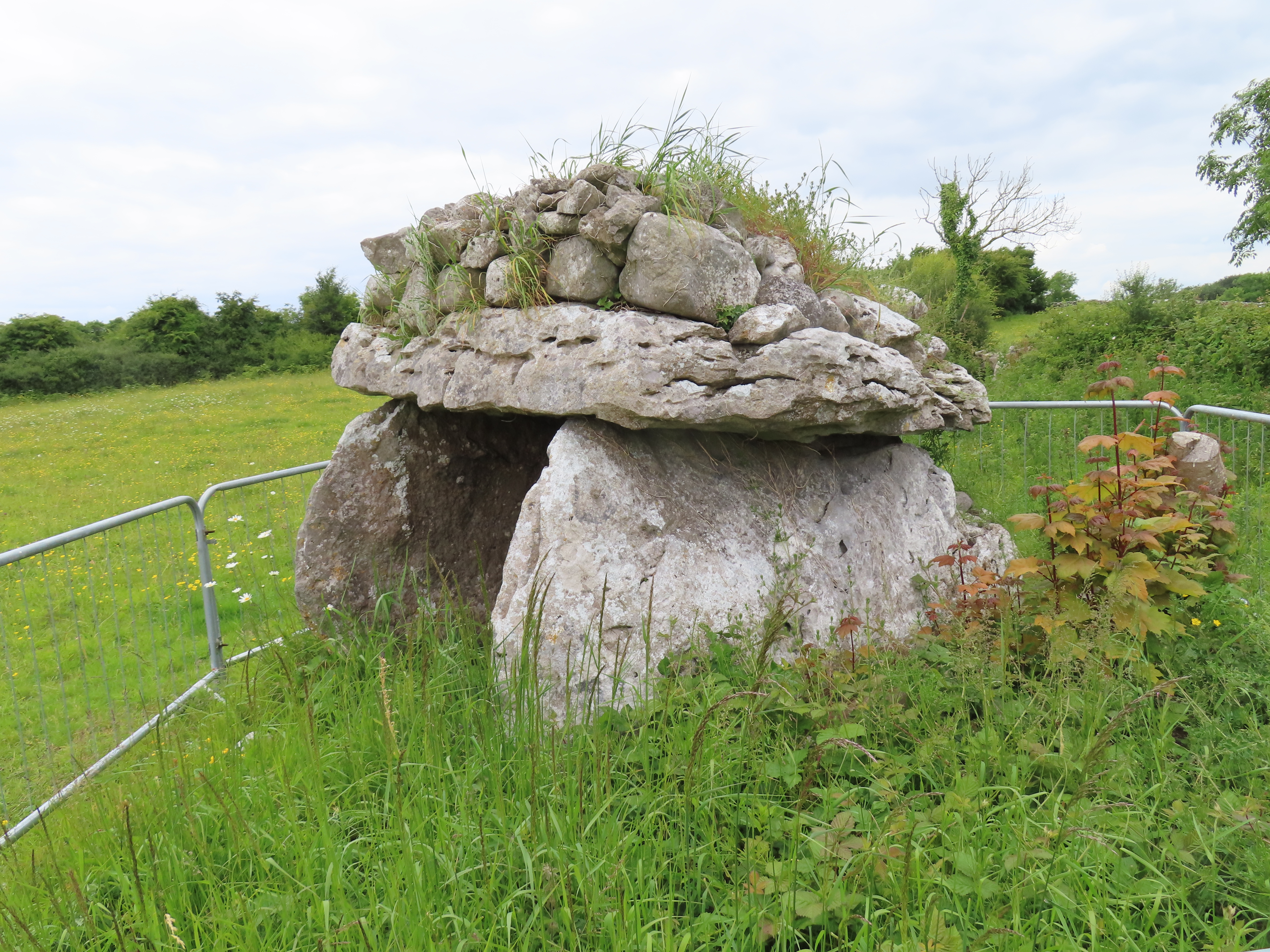
- The tomb in 2024

- Location within Ireland
- 53°9′9.22″N 8°58′21.4″W
- Type: wedge-shaped gallery grave
- Location: Doorus Demesne, Kinvara, County Galway, Ireland

History
- Built: c. 2250 BC

Site notes
- Material: Stone

National monument of Ireland
- Official name: Doorus
- Reference no.: 293

The Doorus Demesne wedge tomb is a wedge-shaped gallery grave and National Monument located in County Galway, Ireland.

== Location ==
Doorus Demesne wedge tomb is located 2.9 km (1.8 mi) northwest of Kinvara on the Doorus Peninsula.

== Description ==
The chamber, measuring 2.5 meters × 1.3 meters, is covered by an enormous roof-stone which measures 2.4 meters in length, 2.1 meters in width and 30 cm in depth. There is a huge amount of cairn material, nearly 1 meter in depth, on top of the roof-stone and it is supported by two large side-stones (one on each side) and an equally large back-stone at NE. There is some evidence of a gallery in front of the NW side-stone but none on the SW side. The monument consists of a simple chamber, with sides and back formed of single stones. The chamber is covered by a roofstone above which is built a stack of field stones.
