= Kinlough Castle =

- Caisleán Chionn Locha (Irish)
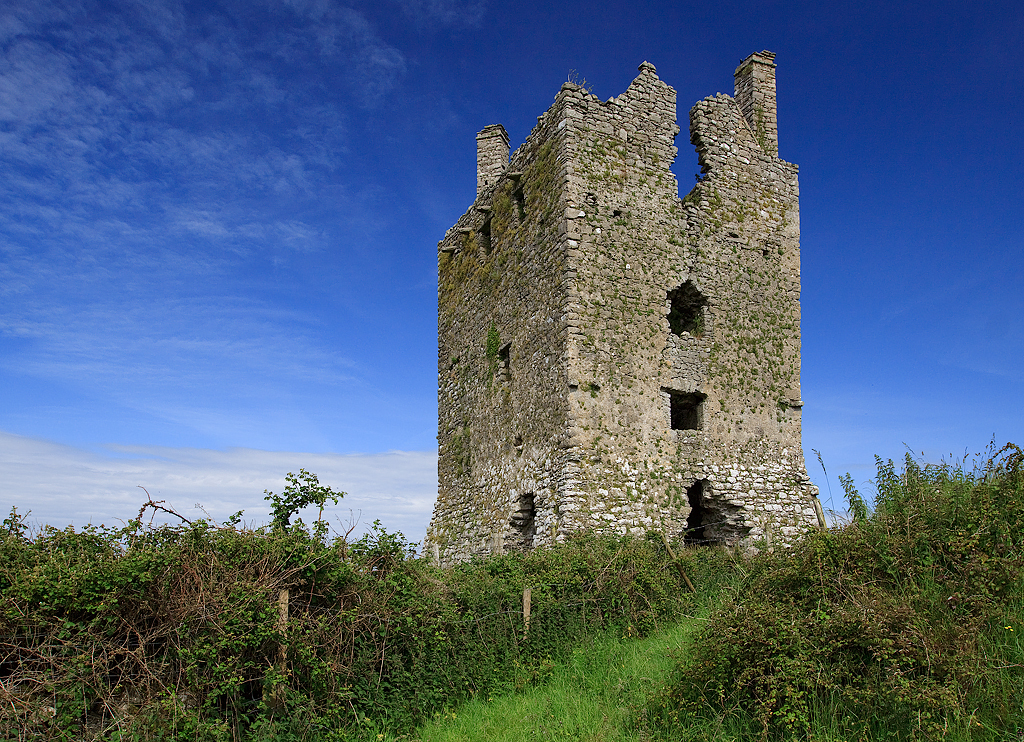

- Location within Ireland
- 53.4986°N 9.1165°W
- Type: tower house
- Location: Kinlough, Shrule, County Mayo, Ireland

History
- Built: 16th century

Site notes
- Owner: Office of Public Works

National monument of Ireland
- Official name: Kinlough Castle
- Reference no.: 95A

Kinlough Castle is a tower house and National Monument located in County Mayo, Ireland. Kinlough Church, part of the National monument, is nearby.

== Location ==
Kinlough Castle is located 3.2 km (2.0 mi) southwest of Shrule, on the west bank of the Black River.

== History ==
The tower is thought to have been constructed in the 13th century AD, although the additional two storeys with corner fireplaces that were subsequently added to it, date from a 1574 remodelling by Sir John MacOliver Burke.

There are loops in the battered base, and the entrance has a drawbar slot.

The castle was mortgaged to the Blakes in 1629, and leased by them to John Darcy in 1668.

The present tower house was built in the 16th century. In a map of 1584 it is described as a "MacWilliam House". "The MacWilliam Eighter", who was then Sir John FitzOliver Burke, lived there in 1574. In 1618 Sir Richard FitzOliver Burke was the tenant and his son, Walter, mortgaged it to Sir Valentine Blake of Menlough, in 1628. Sir Thomas Blake leased it to John Darcy in 1668 and Pierce Joyce purchased the lands in 1852.

== Description ==
Kinlough Castle is four storeys high, with gables at the east and west walls, but no crenellations. There are traces of a bartizan in the west wall. There are also three chimney stacks.

== Wildlife ==
Today it is a nesting site for the common swift (Apus apus).
