= Lissard Ringforts =

- Ráthanna Lios Ard (Irish)
- Location within Ireland
- 53.348145°N 8.389551°W
- Type: ringforts
- Location: Lissard, Kilconnell, County Galway, Ireland

Site notes
- Elevation: 83 m (272 ft)

National monument of Ireland
- Official name: Lissard
- Reference no.: 621

Lissard Ringforts are two ringforts and a national monument located in County Galway, Ireland.

== Location ==
Lissard Ringforts are located 2 km (1¼ mile) northeast of Kilconnell.

== History and description ==
There are two major ringforts in Lissard.

=== North ringfort ===
This bivallate rath covers 0.12 ha (0.30 acres).

=== South ringfort ===
This bivallate rath covers 0.1 ha (0.25 acres) and has a souterrain.
