= Rathsoony =

- Ráth an tSonnaigh (Irish)
- Rathsonny
- Location within Ireland
- 53.181217°N 8.510647°W
- Type: ringfort
- Location: Masonbrook, Loughrea, County Galway, Ireland

History
- Built: 1st–9th century AD

Site notes
- Elevation: 124 m (407 ft)
- Area: 0.6 ha (1.5 acres)

National monument of Ireland
- Official name: Rathsoony
- Reference no.: 499

Rathsoony is a ringfort and national monument located in County Galway, Ireland.

== Location ==
Rathsoony is located 4 km (2 1/2 miles) southeast of Loughrea.

== History and description ==
Rathsoony is a quadrivallate rath not much raised above the field level, with a central rampart and two fosses with an intervening ring and marked by a sunken way. It also has a souterrain. The Irish name means "Ringfort of the palisade", indicating that it was surrounded by a wall of stakes.
