= Ballymacgibbon Cairn =

- Carn Bhaile Mhic Giobúin (Irish)
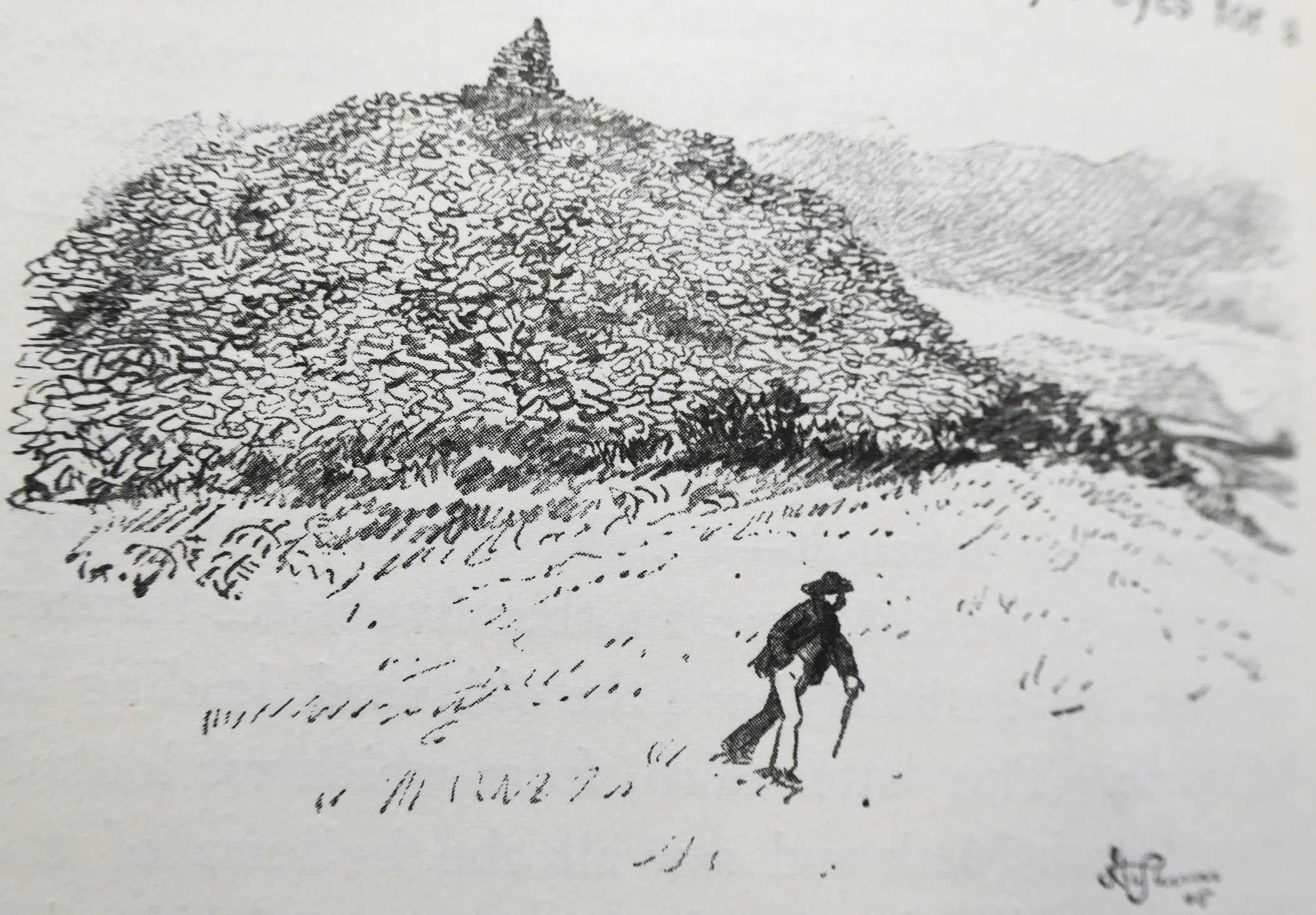
- Ballymagibbon Cairn in 1905 – illustration by Hugh Thomson

- Location within Ireland
- 53.542197°N 9.237080°W
- Type: Cairn
- Location: Ballymacgibbon North, Cross, County Mayo, Ireland

History
- Built: 4000–2500 BC

Site notes
- Elevation: 40 m (130 ft)
- Height: 10 m (33 ft)

National monument of Ireland
- Official name: Ballymacgibbon Cairn
- Reference no.: 251

Ballymacgibbon Cairn is a cairn and National Monument located in County Mayo, Ireland.

== Location ==
Ballymacgibbon Cairn is atop a hill 1.4 km (0.87 mi) west of Cross, County Mayo.

== History ==
Ballymacgibbon Cairn has never been excavated, but is believed to have been constructed in the Neolithic.

William Wilde claimed that the cairn was erected by the mythical king Eochaid mac Eirc to celebrate Battle of Moytura.

== Description ==
The cairn is a large limestone cairn 30 m (98 ft) across. It is surrounded by a low mound, and kerbstones are visible in several places, one of which has some interesting lines or scratches. The sides are very steep and the top is flat, indicating that it almost certainly contains a passage grave.

There is the remains of a lime kiln attached to the north side of the monument.
