= Altore Wedge Tomb =

- Tuama Dinge na hAltóra (Irish)
- Location within Ireland
- 53.704854°N 8.680440°W
- Type: wedge-shaped gallery grave
- Location: Altore, Ballinlough, County Roscommon, Ireland

History
- Built: c. 2250 BC

Site notes
- Elevation: 116 m (381 ft)

National monument of Ireland
- Official name: Altore Wedge Tomb
- Reference no.: 559

The Altore Wedge Tomb is a wedge-shaped gallery grave and national monument located in County Roscommon, Ireland.

== Location ==
Altore Wedge Tomb is located 5.4 km (3.4 mi) southwest of Ballinlough.

== History ==
Altore Wedge Tomb was built c. 2500–2000 BC.

== Description ==
The entrance faces south and is flanked by 2 m (6 ft 7 in) facade stones. A roofstone spans the entrance.
