= Castle Naghten =

- Caiseal Uí Neachtain (Irish)
- Ballycreggan Motte; Castle Naghtan
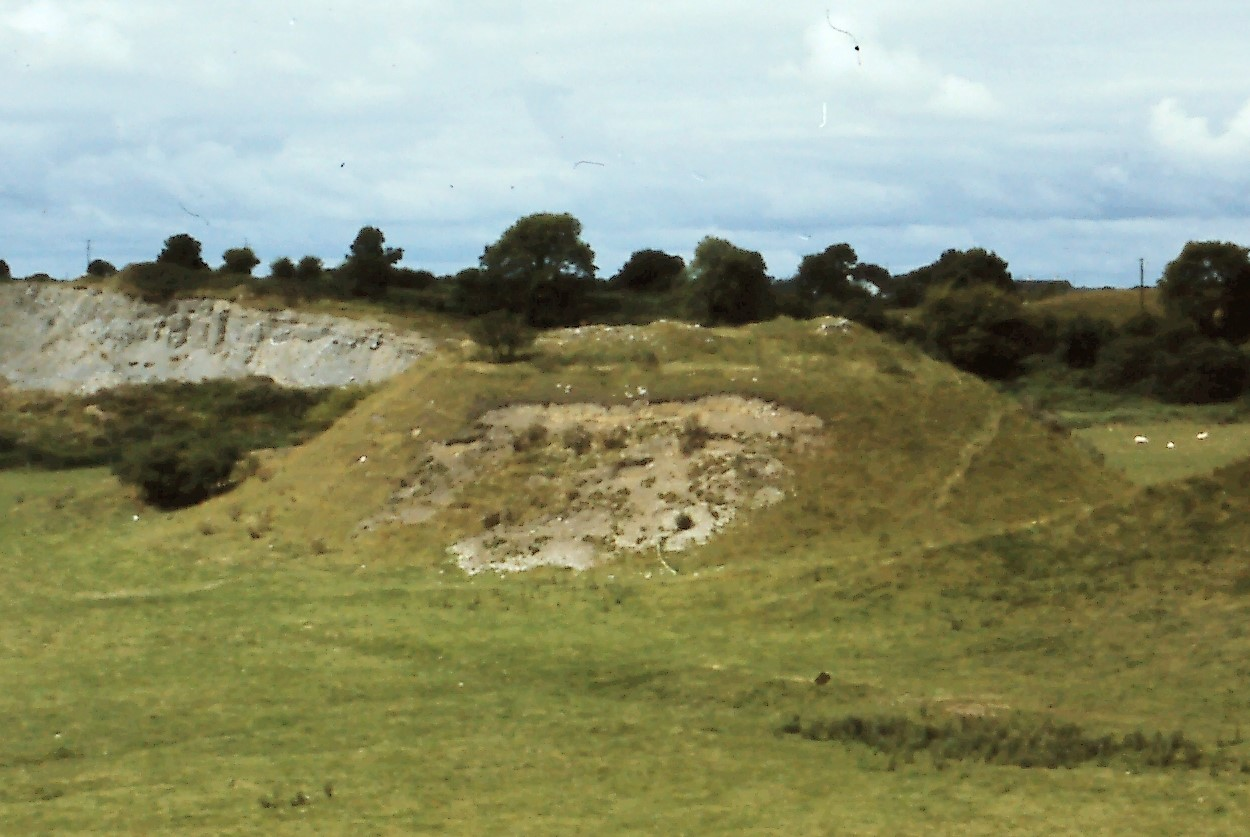

- Location within Ireland
- 53.453222°N 8.060134°W
- Type: motte
- Location: Ballycreggan, Brideswell, County Roscommon, Ireland

History
- Built: late 12th century AD

Site notes
- Elevation: 50 m (160 ft)

National monument of Ireland
- Official name: Castle Naghten
- Designated: 682

Castle Naghten is a motte and National Monument located in County Roscommon, Ireland.

== Location ==
Castle Naghten is located 2 km (1.2 mi) east of Brideswell, on the east bank of the Cross River.

== History ==
Motte-and-bailey castles were a primitive type of castle built after the Norman invasion, a mound of earth topped by a wooden palisade and tower.

The motte at Castle Naghten was constructed to control the route from Athlone to Rindown, a narrow and arduous way passing through bogland.
