= Castlebaldwin =

Village in County Sligo, Ireland

Castlebaldwin Béal Átha na gCarraigíní
- Village
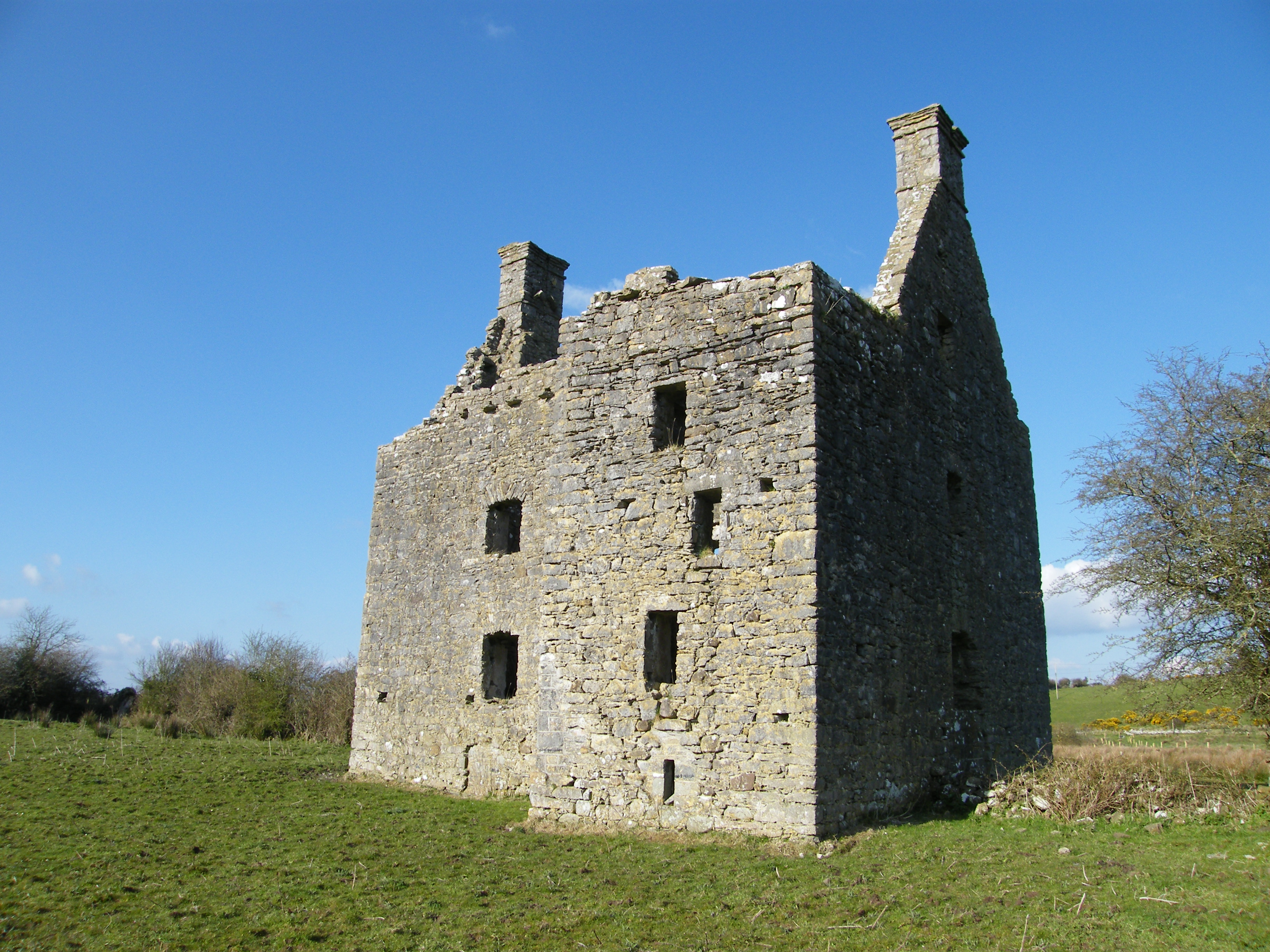
- Castlebaldwin (or Baldwin Castle)

- Location in Ireland
- Coordinates: 54°04′45″N 8°22′34″W
- Country: Ireland
- Province: Connacht
- County: County Sligo
- Elevation: 80 m (260 ft)
- Time zone: UTC+0 (WET)
  - Summer (DST): UTC-1 (IST (WEST))
- Irish Grid Reference: G754145

Castlebaldwin or Bellanagarrigeeny (Irish: Béal Átha na gCarraigíní, meaning 'mouth of the ford of the small rocks') is a townland and small village in County Sligo, Ireland.

The castle outside the village of Castlebaldwin is a fortified 17th-century house rather than a medieval castle, with gun slits in the walls and a machicolation over the door. The walls of the castle are made from stones taken from a nunnery that was near the village. Castlebaldwin is situated near the Carrowkeel Passage Tombs.

== See also ==
- List of towns in the Republic of Ireland
