= Cloonshanville High Cross =

- Ardchros Chluain Seanmhaoil (Irish)
- Location within Ireland
- 53.745381°N 8.456296°W
- Type: High cross
- Location: Cloonshanville, Frenchpark, County Roscommon, Ireland

National monument of Ireland
- Official name: Cloonshanville
- Reference no.: 608

Cloonshanville High Cross is a high cross which is a National Monument in County Roscommon, Ireland.

== Location ==
Cloonshanville High Cross is located 1 km (0.62 mi) east of Frenchpark.
