= Leyny =

Barony in County Sligo, Ireland

Leyny Luíne
- Barony
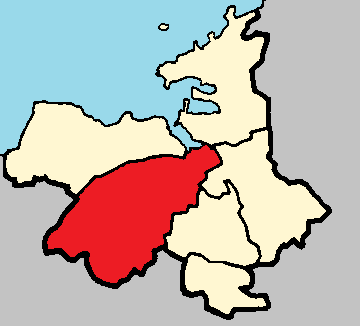
- Country: Ireland
- Province: Connacht
- County: Sligo

Area
  - Land: 490.6 km^{2} (189.4 sq mi)

Population (2016)
  - Total: 10,241
  - Density: 20.9/km^{2} (54/sq mi)

Leyny (Irish: Luíne), also Leyney, is a barony in County Sligo, Ireland. It corresponds to the ancient túath of Luíghne. Leyny consists of these civil parishes: Achonry, Ballysadare, Kilvarnet, Killoran and Kilmacteige.
