= Cummeen Court Cairn =

Cummeen Court Tomb
- Tuama Cúirte an Choimín (Irish)
- Giant's Grave
- Location within Ireland
- 54.277007°N 8.526717°W
- Type: court cairn
- Location: Cummeen, Sligo, County Sligo, Ireland

History
- Built: c. 4000–2500 BC

Site notes
- Elevation: 24 m (79 ft)

National monument of Ireland
- Official name: Cummeen Court Cairns
- Reference no.: 433

Cummeen Court Cairn is a court cairn and National Monument located in County Sligo, Ireland.

== Location ==
Cummeen Court Cairn is located 3 km (1.9 mi) west of Sligo town centre, to the south of Cummeen Strand.

== History ==
This court cairn was built c. 4000–2500 BC, in the Neolithic.

== Description ==
Cummeen Court Cairn is a central court tomb with the court removed, standing on a raised earth platform up to 2 m (6 ft 7 in) above field level. Two galleries, aligned east–west, face each other 5 m (16 ft) apart. The east gallery was divided into two chambers and is 4.6 m (15 ft) long. The west gallery is 6 m (20 ft) long.
