= Emlagh High Cross =

- Ardchros Imligh (Irish)
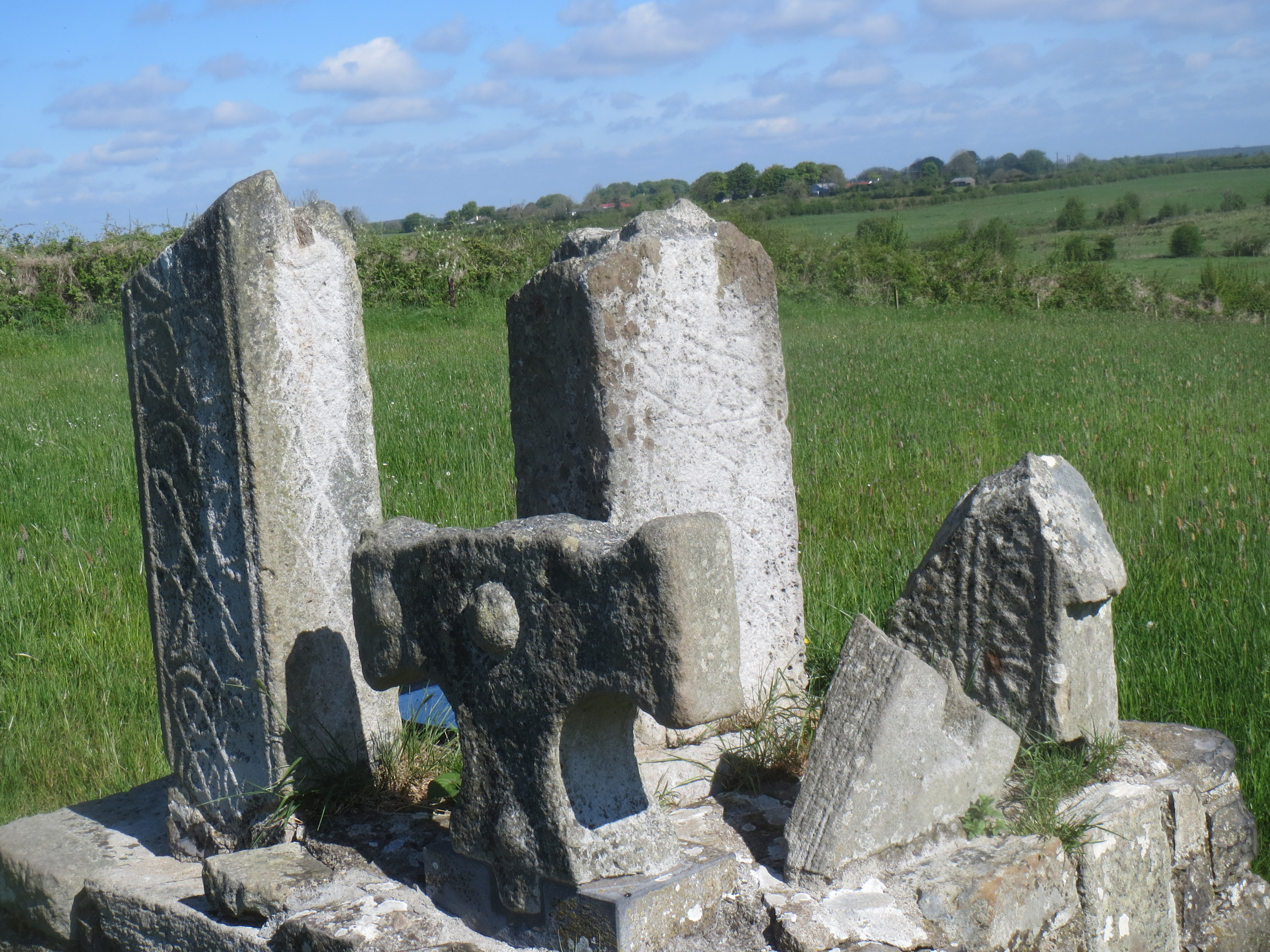

- Location within Ireland
- 53.745381°N 8.456296°W
- Type: High crosses
- Location: Emlagh, Castlerea, County Roscommon, Ireland

National monument of Ireland
- Official name: Emlagh
- Reference no.: 397

Emlagh High Cross or Emlagh Cross is a high cross which is a National Monument in County Roscommon, Ireland.

== Location ==
Emlagh High Cross is located 3.5 km (2.2 mi) southwest of Castlerea.
