= Carrowreagh Court Tomb =

- Tuama Cúirte na Ceathrún Riabhaí (Irish)
- Location within Ireland
- 54.059854°N 8.942121°W
- Type: court cairn
- Location: Carrowreagh, Kilmactigue, County Sligo, Ireland

History
- Built: c. 4000–2500 BC

Site notes
- Elevation: 262 m (860 ft)

National monument of Ireland
- Official name: Carrowreagh Court Tomb
- Reference no.: 479

Carrowreagh Court Tomb is a court cairn and National Monument located in County Sligo, Ireland.

== Location ==
Carrowreagh Court Tomb is located 3.9 km (2.4 mi) northwest of Aclare, high in the Slieve Gamph Mountains in the middle of a peat bog.

== History ==
Carrowreagh Court Tomb was constructed in the Neolithic, c. 4000–2500 BC. A cist was found nearby, 30 m (33 yd) to the SW.

The court was located in the northwest. The gallery is kite-shaped with an entrance 2 m (6½ ft) wide. This widens to over 3 m (10 ft) at the jambs. There may have been three or four terminal chambers, an unusually high number – it is hard to be exact as the stones are in disarray.
