= Dún Conor =

- Dún Crocbhur · Dún Chonchuir · Dún Chonchubhair (Irish)
- Conor's Fort, Doonconor, The Black Fort
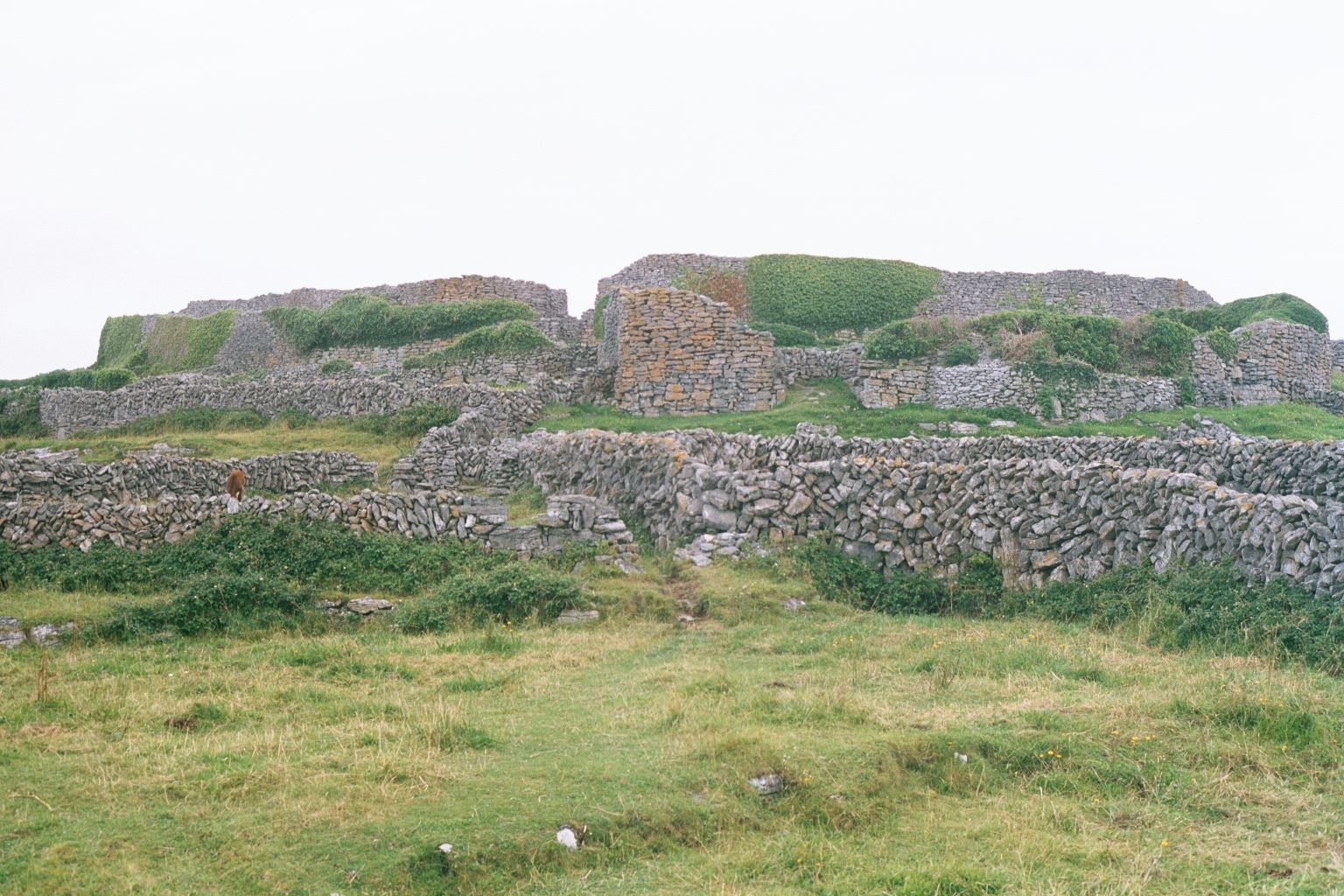

- Location within Ireland
- 53°05′00″N 09°35′41″W
- Type: stone ringfort
- Location: Carrowntemple, Inishmaan, County Galway, Ireland

Site notes
- Elevation: 73 m (240 ft)
- Height: 5 m (16 ft)
- Area: 1,900 m^{2} (0.47 acres)
- Architectural style: Gaelic Ireland
- Owner: State

National monument of Ireland
- Official name: Dun Conor Cashel
- Reference no.: 42

Dún Conor is a stone ringfort (cashel) and national monument located on Inishmaan, Ireland.

== Location ==
Dún Conor is located at the centre of Inishmaan, at the island's highest point.

== History ==
The fort probably dates back to the first millennium AD.

At that time, sea levels were lower and the Aran Islands part of the mainland, and the other forts like Dún Aengus were not on the coast. They have been heavily damaged by time and the sea, but Dún Conor's central location has protected it. The name means "Conor's Fort;" legends link it to Conor, son of Hua Mór and brother of Aengus. The size of the forts on the Aran Islands gave rise to the legends of the Fir Bolg.

John O'Donovan visited Dún Conor in 1839. The clocháns in the interior were restored in the 1880s.

== Description ==
A stone ringfort with an irregular elliptical shape, internally measuring about 69 m (226 ft) N-S and 35 m (115 ft) E-W; although smaller than Dún Aengus, it has thicker walls, up to 6 m (20 ft) in places. It is built in four terraces with internal stairs. The west wall is built atop a natural internal cliff; the other sides are guarded by a second wall, with a bastion in the northeast.

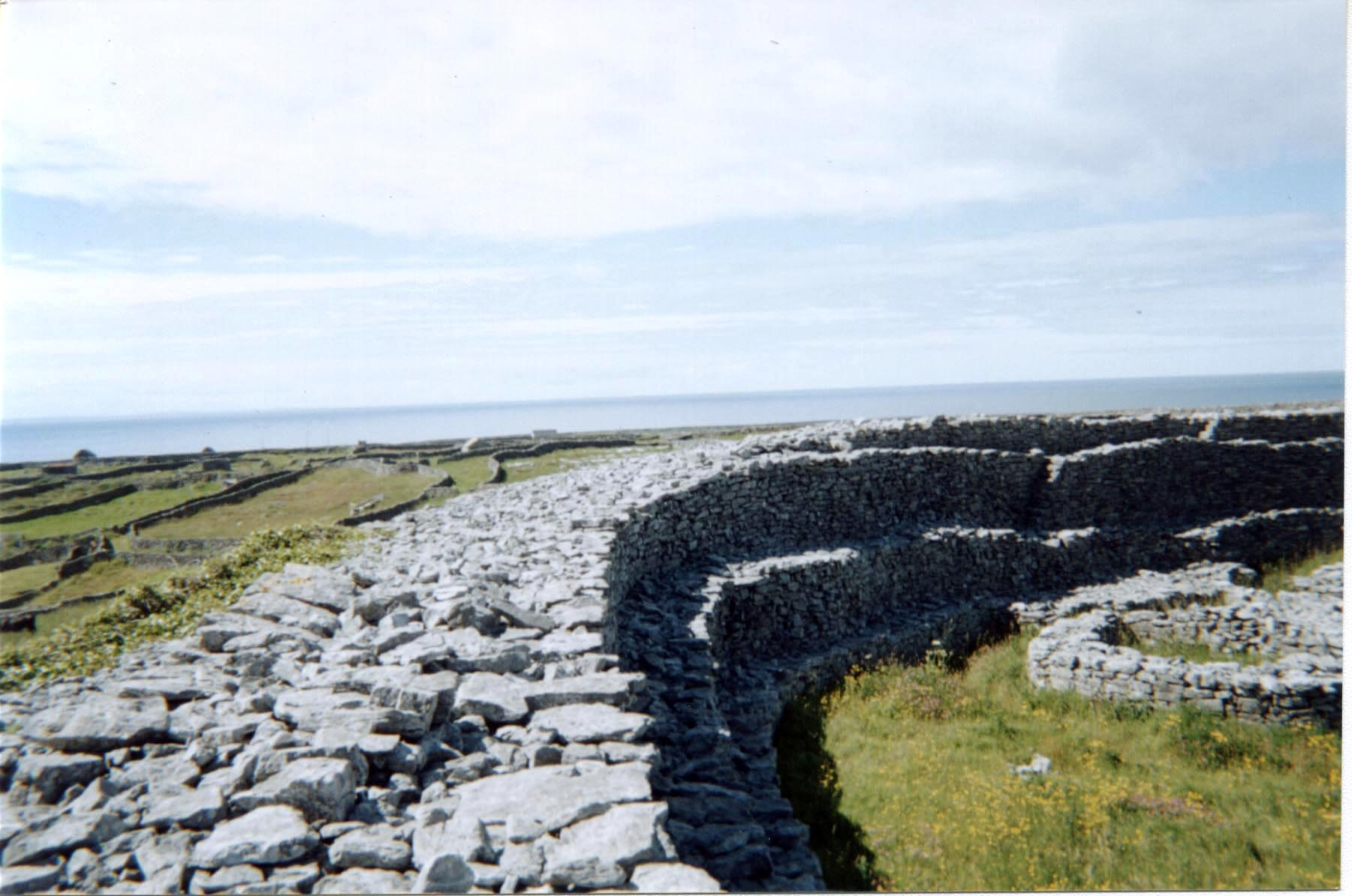

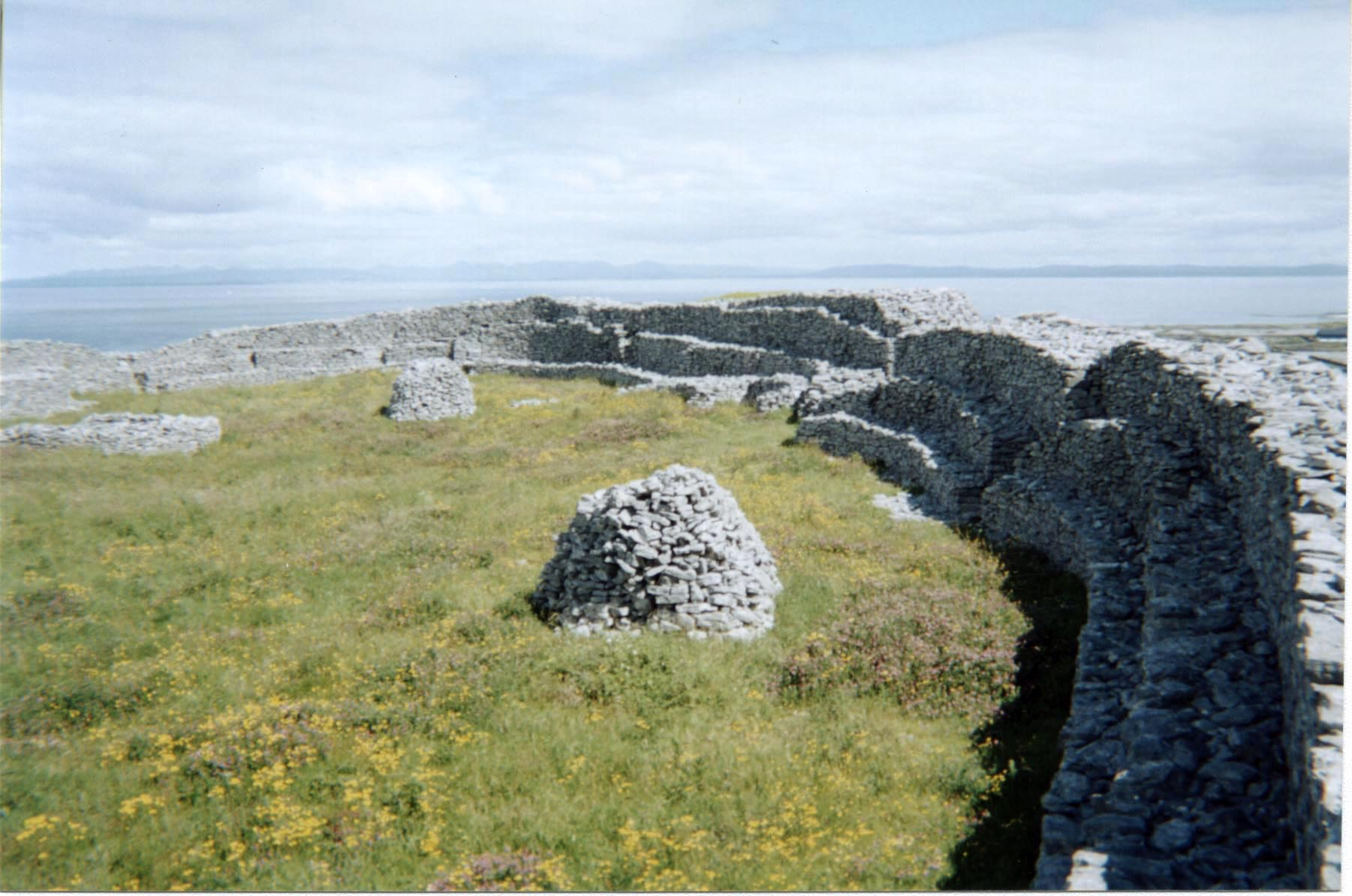

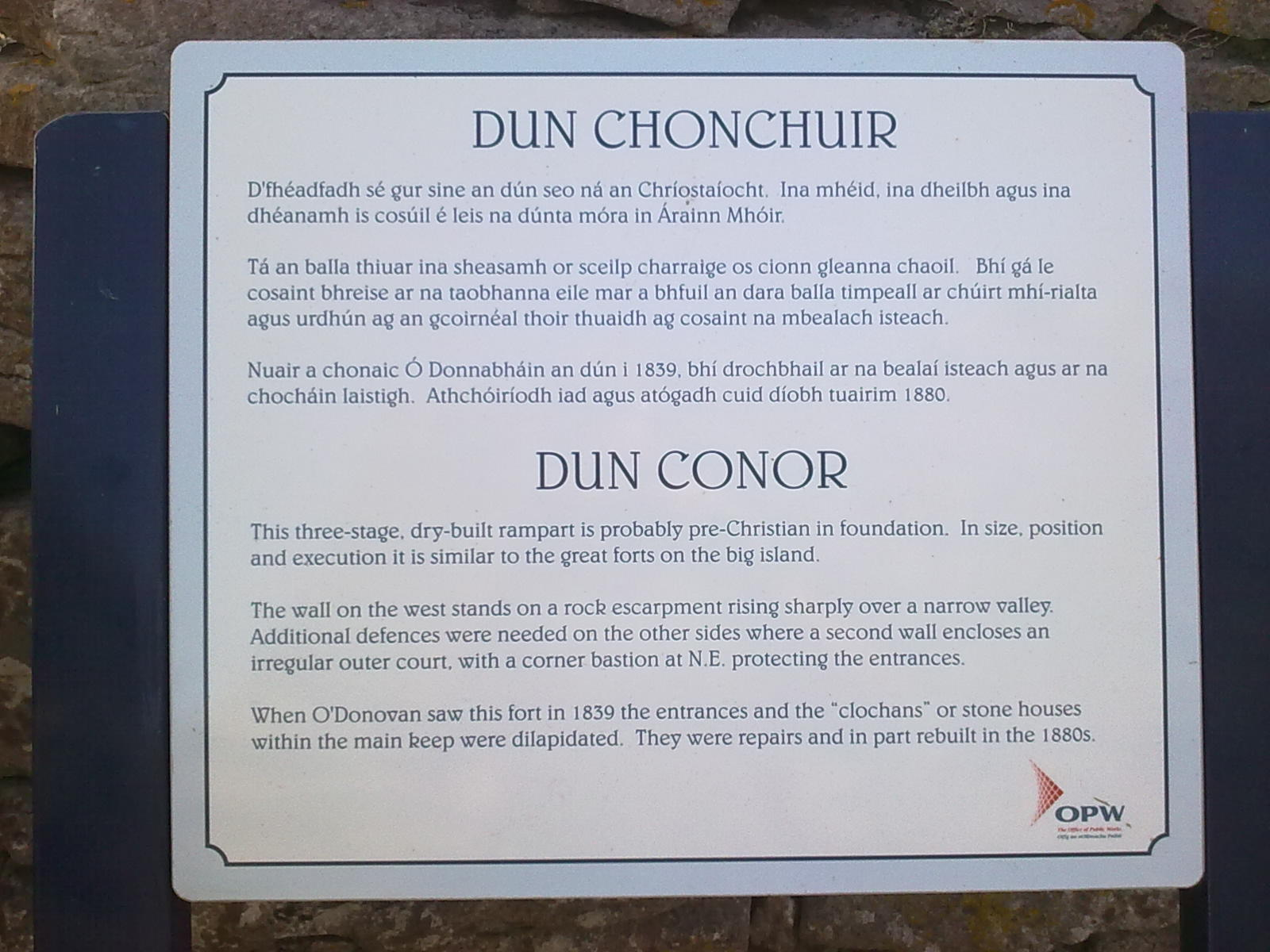

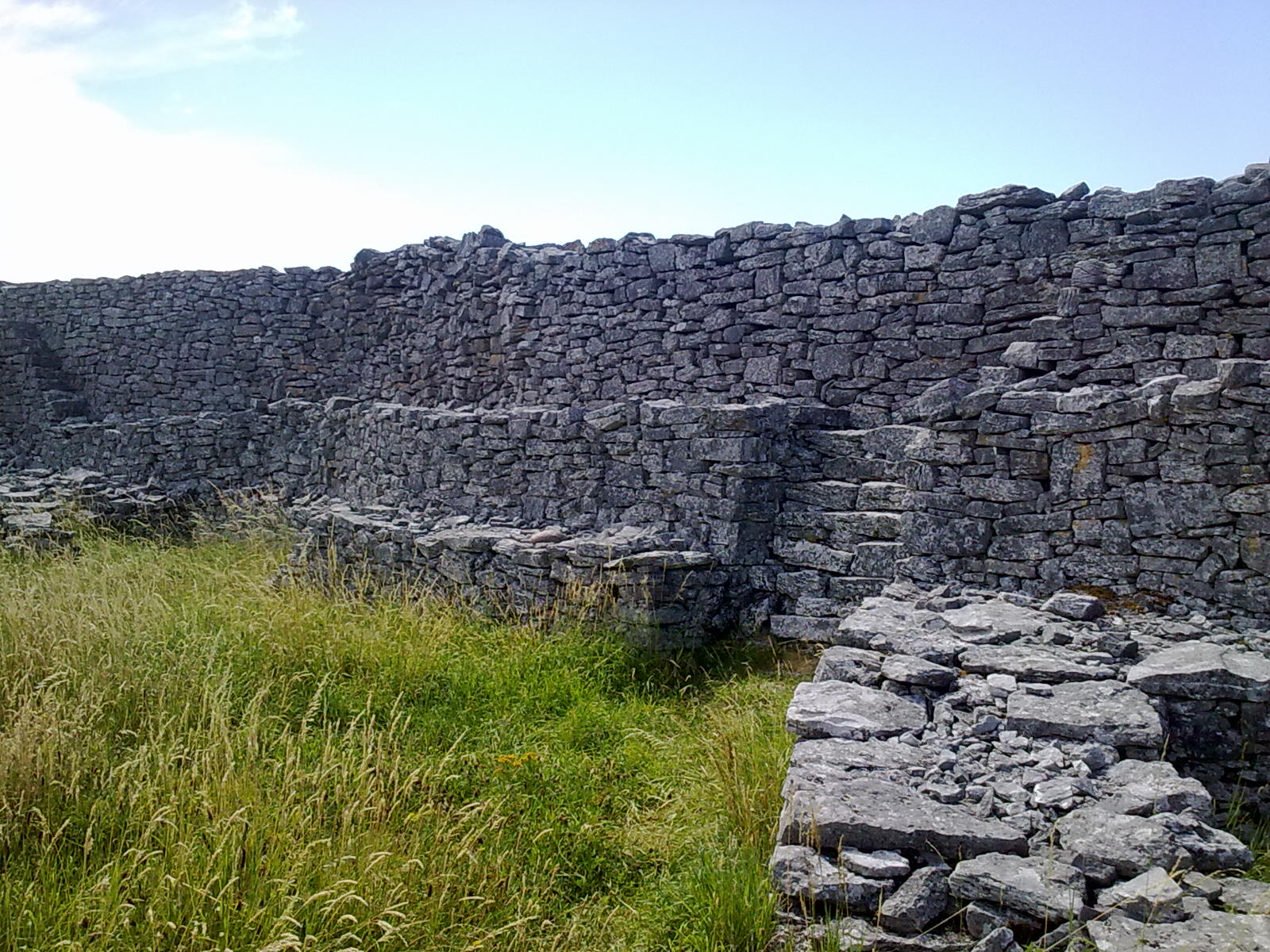

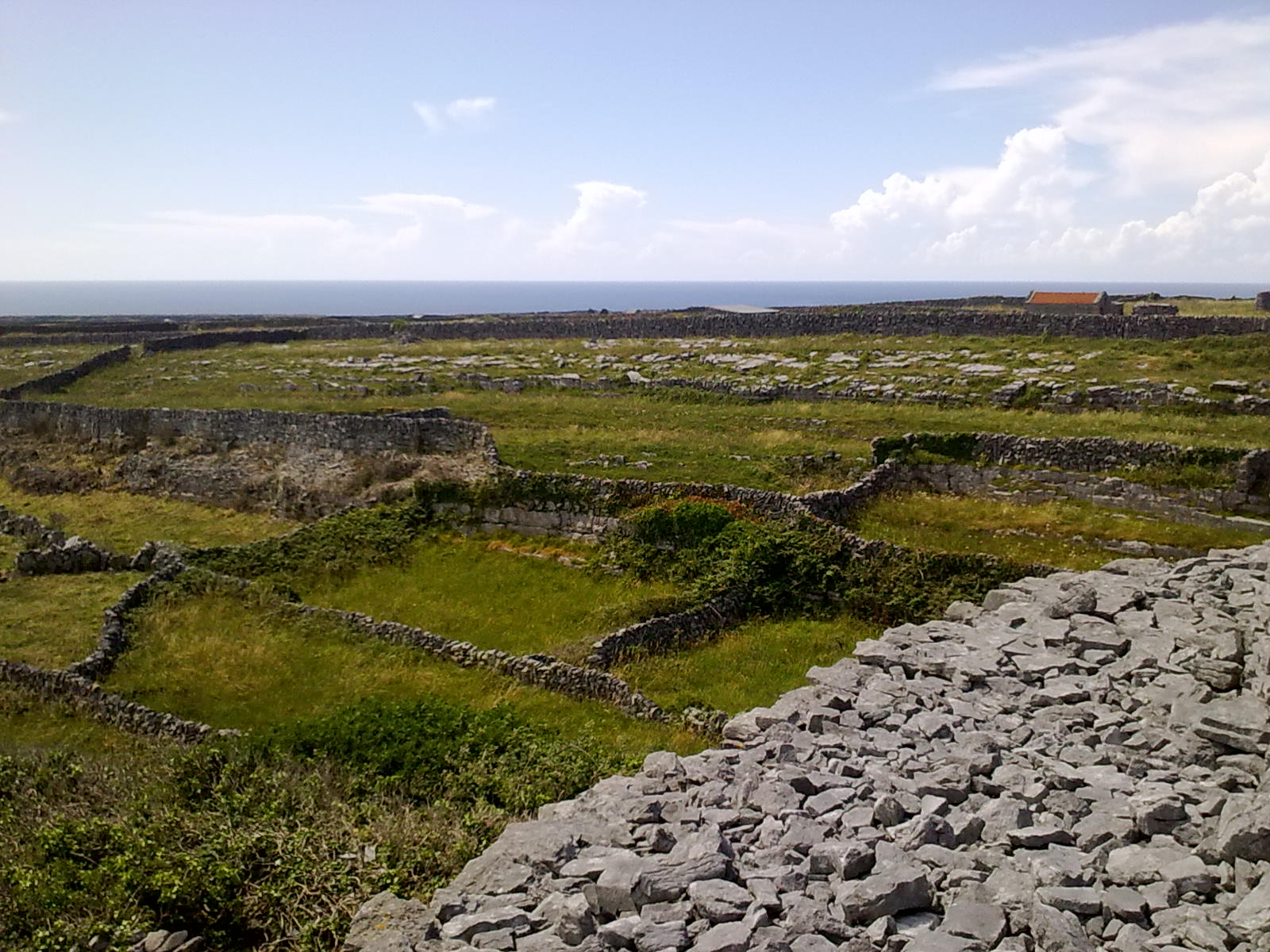

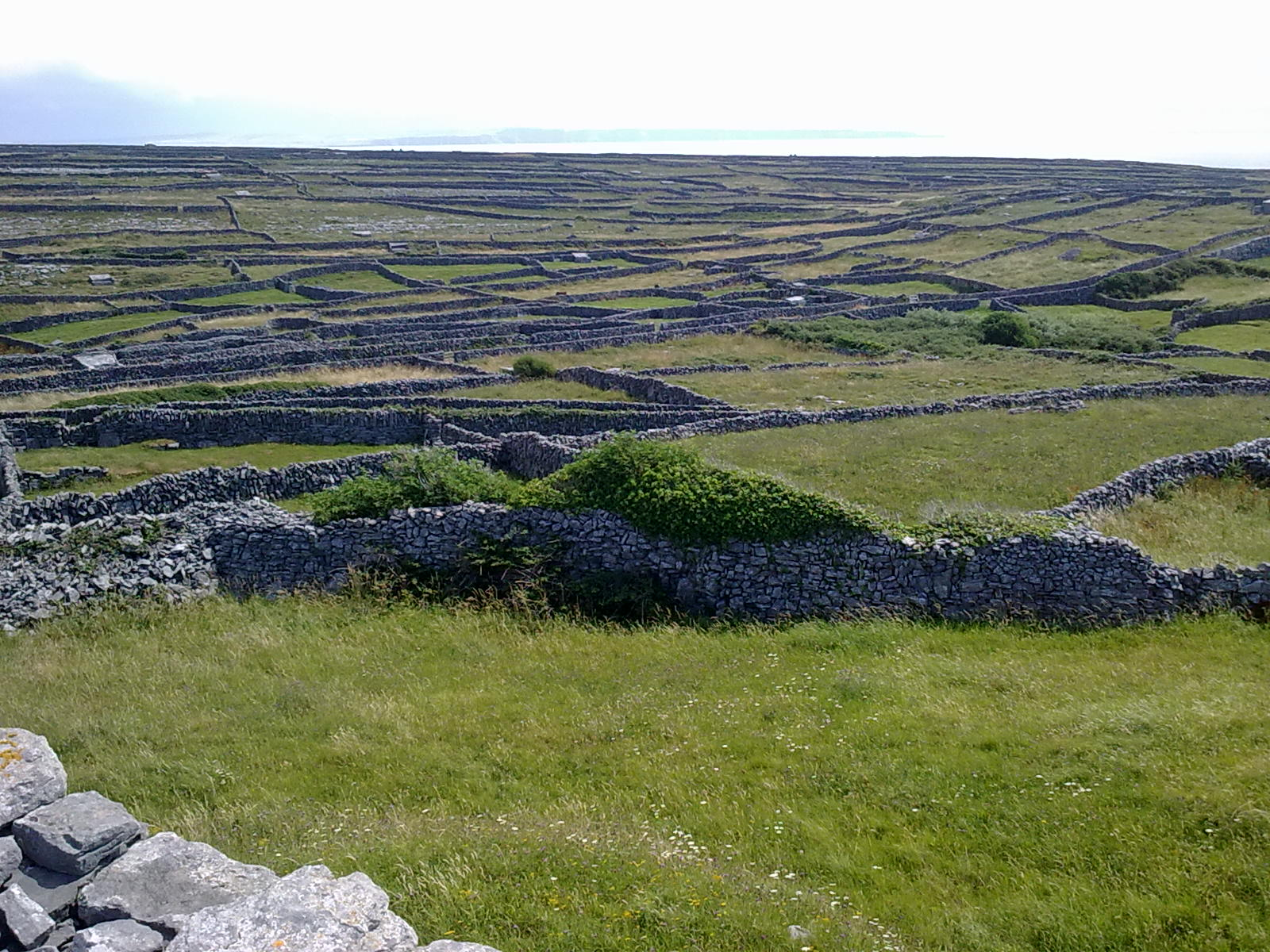

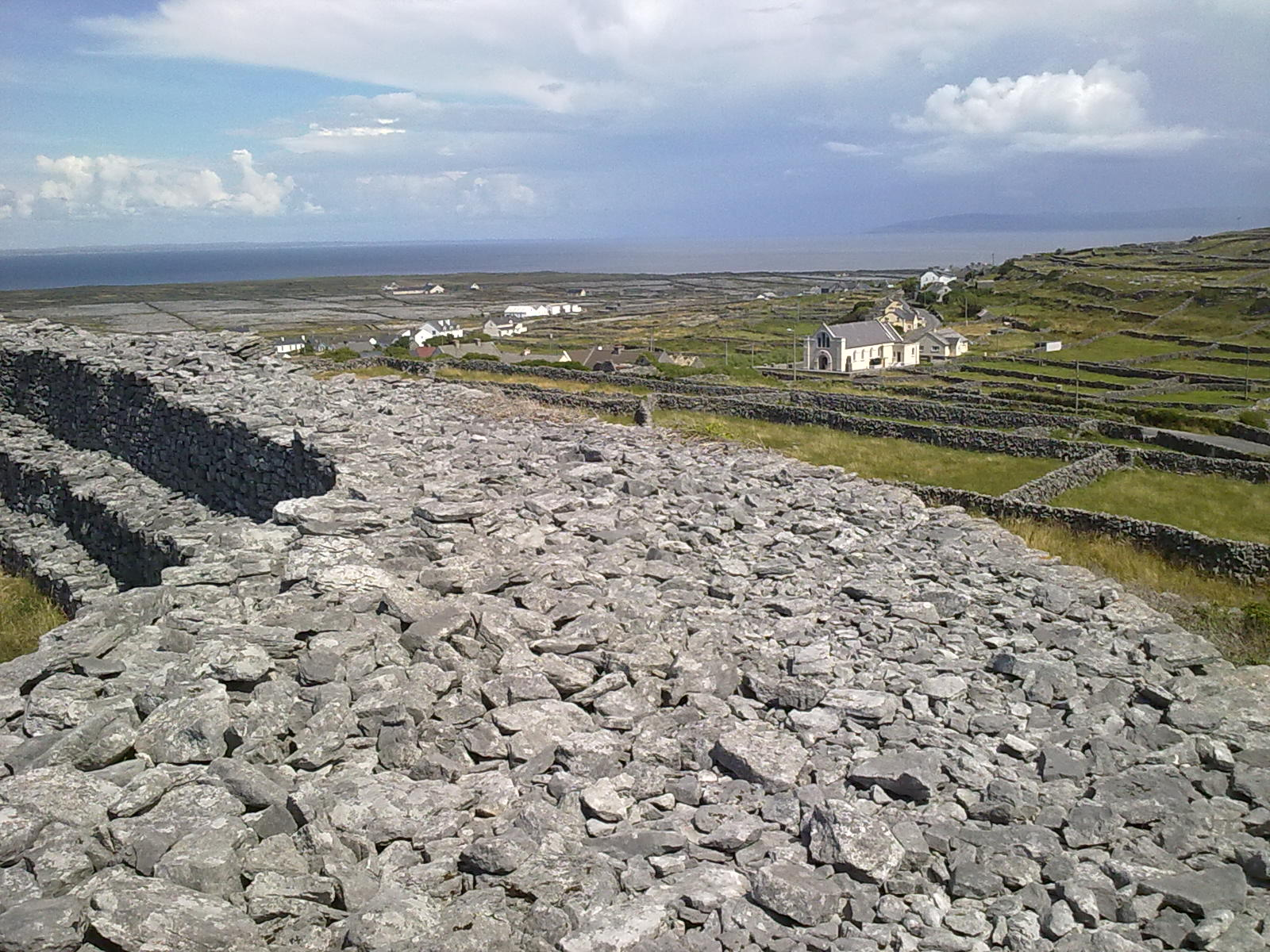
