= Drummin fort =

Ringfort in County Roscommon, Ireland

- Ráth na Dromainne (Irish)
- Location within Ireland
- 53.834358°N 8.368769°W
- Type: ringfort with ogham stones
- Location: Drummin, Bellanagare, County Roscommon, Ireland

History
- Built: 1st–9th century AD

Site notes
- Elevation: 86 m (282 ft)
- Area: 0.52 ha (1.3 acres)

National monument of Ireland
- Official name: Drummin Ringfort & Ogham Stones
- Reference no.: 650

Drummin fort is a ringfort and National Monument located in County Roscommon, Ireland.

== Location ==
Drummin ringfort is located 900 m (½ mile) east-southeast of Bellanagare.

== History and description ==
Drummin Rath contains a pair of Ogham stones close to the southern part.

=== Ogham stones ===
Drummin I (CIIC 11) reads CUNOVATO on a Sandstone pillar 1.05 m (3 ft 5 in) high. This suggests *Kunowatīs, "dog prophet," and a 5th-century date.

Drummin II reads RAVASA KOI MAQQI D/T ... L ("Here is Ravasa, son of ...") and SENN on a sandstone pillar 1.9 m (6 ft 3 in) high.
