= Carricknagat Megalithic Tombs =

Tombs in County Sligo, Ireland

Carricknagat
- Tuamaí Meigiliteach Charraig na gCat (Irish)
- Dermot & Grania's Bed and Giant's Grave
- Location within Ireland
- 54.334821°N 8.004539°W
- Type: wedge-shaped gallery grave and dolmen
- Location: Carricknagat, Ballygawley, County Sligo, Ireland

History
- Built: c. 4000–2500 BC

Site notes
- Elevation: 63 m (207 ft)

National monument of Ireland
- Official name: Carricknagat
- Reference no.: 277.01

Carricknagat Megalithic Tombs are megalithic tombs and a National Monument located in County Sligo, Ireland.

== Location ==
Carricknagat is located halfway between Ballygawley and Ballintogher, near a source of the Ballisodare River.

== History ==
Carricknagat tombs were built c. 4000–2500 BC, in the Neolithic.

The name means "the cats' stone" or "the pine martens' stone;" ancient monuments are often said to be haunted by wild animals, possibly representing the spirits of the dead.

== Description ==
=== West tomb ===
The tomb to the west, a wedge-shaped gallery grave (wedge tomb) called the Giant's Grave, is trapezoidal in plan with the inner end of a SSE-facing gallery (4 × 2.6 m) and is divided by jambs inset in the gallery walls, with a rear chamber 2 m (7 ft) long. The outer chamber is composed of side-stones, an upright stone and three kerb-stones.

=== East tomb ===
This tomb, a dolmen, is traditionally called Dermot & Grania's Bed.
