= Cashelore =

- Caisleán an Uabhair (Irish)
- Cashel Bir; Bawnboy
- Location within Ireland
- 54.210069°N 8.377572°W
- Type: stone ringfort
- Location: Castleore, Ballintogher, County Sligo, Ireland

Site notes
- Elevation: 49 m (161 ft)
- Area: 500 m^{2} (5,400 sq ft)

National monument of Ireland
- Official name: Cashel Bir Stone Fort
- Reference no.: 277.02

Cashelore, also called Cashel Bir or Bawnboy, is a stone ringfort (cashel) and National Monument located in County Sligo, Ireland.

== Location ==
Cashelore is located on the southern slopes of Benbo Mountain, 1.3 km (¾ mile) northwest of Ballintogher.

== History ==
Cashelore was built in the early Christian period (AD 400–1100). The name may mean "Fort Pride", while Cashel Bir is caiseal bir, "stone ringfort of stakes", presumably meaning that there was a palisade surrounding it, and Bawnboy is bábhún buidhe, "yellow walled enclosure."

Skeletons were formerly found near the fort.

It is believed to be identical with Caislen-in-nuabhair, mentioned in the Annals of Loch Cé, entry for 1389:

Ó Ruairc subsequently brought the sons of Cathal Óg to him, and the war grew fierce after that. Eoghan O'Ruairc and the sons of Cathal Og went to Caislen-in-nuabhair, when the cavalry of Muintir hÉilidhe opposed them, and made an attack on them; and the son of Ó hÉilidhe was killed by them, together with Maghnus Ó hÉilidhe. Muintir hÉilidhe were plundered by O'Ruairc, and by the sons of Cathal Óg. Muirchertach Ó hÉilidhe was slain in this war. Maghnus Ó Ruairc was taken prisoner, per dolum, by Cormac Ó Fearghail. Peace was concluded by Ó Ruairc, and by Domhnall son of Muirchertach, and by the Clann-Donnchaidh, respectively.

The O'Rourkes were kings of West Breifne (roughly County Leitrim), while the Ó hÉilidhe (Healys) were based around the Curlew Mountains, Ballinafad and the west of Lough Arrow. Per dolum is Latin for "by trickery." The Ó Fearghail ruled Angaile (roughly County Longford).

== Description ==
This is a stone ringfort 23 m (75 ft) long E-W and 16 m (52 ft) NS, with walls 3 m (9.8 ft) thick and 2.4 m (7 ft 10 in) high.

A souterrain led to the bottom of the hill and could have functioned as an escape route.
