= Bawn =

Defensive wall surrounding an Irish tower house

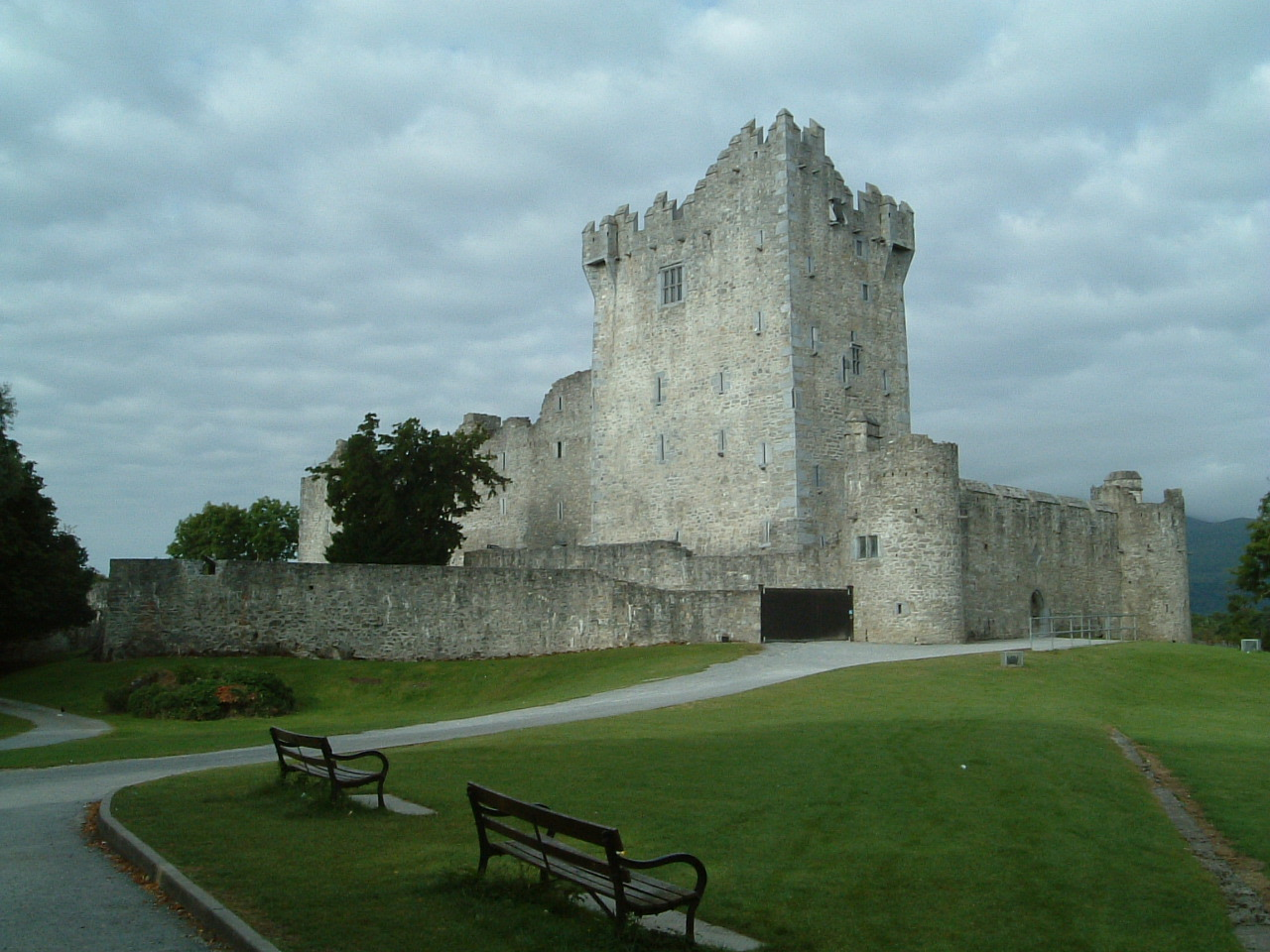
Ross Castle with its surrounding bawn

A bawn is the defensive wall enclosing an Irish tower house. The term is the anglicised form of the Irish word bábhún (also historically spelled badhún), which is thought to derive from words meaning "cattle-stronghold" or "cattle-enclosure". The Irish word for "cow" is bó (plural ba), while dún means "stronghold" or "enclosure"; its genitive case is dúin.

Bawns originally served to protect cattle from raids and other attacks. Early bawns typically consisted of trenches reinforced with stakes or hedges, which were gradually superseded by stone walls. As tower houses became widespread, the term came to refer specifically to the defensive walls surrounding these structures. Comparable terms in England and Scotland include "pele" (as in pele tower) and "barmkin".

== See also ==
- Tower houses in Britain and Ireland
- Curtain wall
