= List of national monuments in County Galway =

The Irish state has officially approved the following list of national monuments in County Galway. In the Republic of Ireland, a structure or site may be deemed to be a "national monument", and therefore worthy of state protection, if it is of national importance. If the land adjoining the monument is essential to protect it, this land may also be protected.

== National Monuments ==
NM#	Monument name	Description	Image	Townland	Location
278	Abbert Demesne Church	Church		Abbert Demesne	53°25′34″N 8°41′01″W
166	Knockmoy Abbey in Abbeyknockmoy	Abbey (Cistercian)		Abbeyknockmoy	53°26′25″N 8°44′34″W
47	Kilconnell Abbey	Friary (Franciscan)		Kilconnell	53°19′57″N 8°24′03″W
273	Dunmore Abbey	Friary (Augustinian)		Abbeyland North	53°37′05″N 8°44′29″W
512	Clontuskert Abbey	Priory (Augustinian)		Abbeypark	53°16′57″N 8°12′56″W
49	Annaghdown	Early Medieval Ecclesiastical Site		Annaghdown	53°23′13″N 9°04′21″W
252	Ardamullivan Castle	Castle		Ardamullivan	53°00′16″N 8°49′45″W
164	Athenry Abbey	Priory (Dominican)		Athenry	53°17′54″N 8°44′40″W
406	Athenry Castle	Castle		Athenry	53°18′00″N 8°44′41″W
371	Aughrim Ringforts	Two Ringforts		Attidermot	53°17′37″N 8°18′52″W
470	Aughnanure Castle	Castle		Aughnanure	53°25′08″N 9°16′32″W
369	Caheravoley Fort	House & Bawn		Caheravoley, Kilcahill	53°25′08″N 8°54′29″W
42	Doonbeg Ringfort	Ringfort		Carrownlisheen (Inishmaan)	53°05′00″N 9°35′41″W
42	Carrownlisheen Wedge Tomb (Diarmuid and Gráinne's Bed)	Wedge Tomb		Carrownlisheen (Inishmaan)	53°05′14″N 9°34′52″W
42	Templesaghtmacree	Church		Carrownlisheen (Inishmaan)	53°05′02″N 9°35′25″W
42	Carrownlisheen Cross	Cross		Carrownlisheen (Inishmaan)	53°04′50″N 9°34′32″W
42	Labbanakinneriga	Church		Carrownlisheen (Inishmaan)	53°05′02″N 9°35′25″W
42	Doonfarvagh	Cashel		Carrownlisheen (Inishmaan)	53°04′51″N 9°34′48″W
42	Kilcoonagh Church	Church		Carrownlisheen (Inishmaan)	53°04′50″N 9°34′33″W
42	Dún Conor (Dún Conchuir)	Cashel		Carrowntemple (Inishmaan)	53°05′00″N 9°35′41″W
248	Dunmore Castle	Castle		Castlefarm	53°37′26″N 8°45′20″W
467	St. Cuan's Well	Well & Cross slabs		Castlegar East	53°24′55″N 8°18′57″W
428	Feartagar or Jennings Castle	Castle		Castlegrove East	53°34′11″N 8°56′34″W
272	Isert Kelly Castle	Castle		Castlepark	53°09′29″N 8°43′08″W
259	Kiltartan Castle	Castle		Castletown (Kiltartan)	53°05′25″N 8°48′27″W
165	Claregalway Abbey	Friary (Franciscan)		Claregalway	53°20′48″N 8°56′40″W
563	Cloonigny Castle	Ringfort & Castle		Cloonigny	53°21′17″N 8°21′17″W
283	Derryhiveny Castle	Castle		Derryhiveny South	53°07′37″N 8°11′32″W
527	Doorus Demesne wedge tomb	Wedge Tomb		Doorus Demesne	53°09′08″N 8°58′20″W
254	Drumacoo	Early Medieval Ecclesiastical Site		Drumacoo	53°11′55″N 8°54′16″W
365	Drumharsna Castle	Castle		Drumharsna South	53°08′36″N 8°50′35″W
206	Fiddaun Castle	Castle		Tubber	53°00′38″N 8°52′46″W
554	Kilnalekin Abbey	Abbey (Cistercian)		Friary	53°06′11″N 8°23′31″W
439	Glinsk Castle	Castle		Glinsk	53°39′07″N 8°25′55″W
52	High Island	Early Medieval Ecclesiastical Site		High Island and Kill	53°32′41″N 10°15′40″W
412	Inchagoill	Early Medieval Ecclesiastical Site		Inchagoill	53°29′09″N 9°18′59″W
41.01	Creggankeel Fort	Cashel		Inisheer	53°03′26″N 9°31′07″W
41.05	St. Gobnet's Church (Kilgobnet)	Church		Inisheer	53°03′58″N 9°31′45″W
41.06	Knockgrannary (Cnoc Raithní)	Burial Ground		Inisheer	53°03′54″N 9°31′24″W
41.08	St. Cavan's Church	Church		Inisheer	53°03′50″N 9°30′50″W
41.07	O'Brien's Castle (Great Fort, Furmina Castle)	Cashel		Inisheer	53°03′43″N 9°31′09″W
41.02	Grave of the Seven Daughters (Cill na Seacht Niníon)	Early Medieval Ecclesiastical Site		Inisheer	53°03′26″N 9°31′06″W
642	Kilcornan	Deserted Medieval Village		Kilcornan (Monivea)	53°18′48″N 8°42′49″W
43.01	Arkin's Castle	Castle		Killeany (Inishmore)	53°06′17″N 9°39′47″W
43.04	Temple Benen	Church		Killeany (Inishmore)	53°06′11″N 9°39′59″W
43.11	Turmartin	Watch Tower		Killeany (Inishmore)	53°05′29″N 9°38′20″W
43	Oghil Leacht Cuimhne	Leacht Cuimhne (cenotaph for those lost at sea)		Killeany (Inishmore)	53°07′45″N 9°41′25″W
43	Tighlagh Eany	Church		Killeany (Inishmore)	53°06′05″N 9°39′10″W
43	Killeany Clacháns	Clocháns		Killeany (Inishmore)	53°06′35″N 9°41′19″W
43.03	St. Eany's	Early Medieval Ecclesiastical Site		Killeany (Inishmore)	53°06′12″N 9°39′50″W
43	Doocaher (Black Fort)	Promontory Fort		Killeany (Inishmore)	53°06′16″N 9°41′15″W
51	Kilmacduagh monastery	Churches & Round Tower		Kilmacduagh	53°02′53″N 8°53′16″W
43	Temple MacDuagh	Church		Kilmurvy (Inishmore)	53°07′51″N 9°45′33″W
43.15	Templenaneeve	Church		Kilmurvy (Inishmore)	53°07′51″N 9°45′33″W
43	Dun Aengus	Promontory Fort		Inishmore	53°07′32″N 9°46′00″W
43	Clochán na Carraige	Clochán		Kilmurvy (Inishmore)	53°08′32″N 9°45′37″W
446	Kiltiernan Church	Church & Cashel		Kiltiernan East	53°11′17″N 8°50′34″W
627	Lackan Ringfort	Ringfort & Souterrain		Lackan (Ardrahan)	53°09′49″N 8°46′56″W
621	Lissard Ringforts	Two Ringforts & Souterrain		Lissard	53°20′53″N 8°23′22″W
245	Castlekirk (Hen's Castle)	Castle		Drumsnauv	53°29′33″N 9°30′48″W
499	Rathsoony	Ringfort		Masonbrook	53°10′30″N 8°30′56″W
499	Rahannagragh (Rahannagroagh)	Ringfort		Masonbrook	53°10′37″N 8°30′51″W
609	Merlinpark Castle (Merlin Castle)	Castle		Merlinpark	53°16′47″N 8°59′53″W
498	The Seven Monuments	Embanked Stone Circle		Moanmore East	53°11′19″N 8°31′52″W
43	St. Kieran's	Early Medieval Ecclesiastical Site		Oghil (Inishmore)	53°07′55″N 9°41′07″W
43	St. Soorney's	Church & Enclosure		Oghil (Inishmore)	53°08′01″N 9°41′43″W
43	Temple an Cheathrair Aluinn	Church & grave		Oghil (Inishmore)	53°07′47″N 9°42′58″W
43	Oghill	Cashel		Oghil (Inishmore)	53°07′38″N 9°41′59″W
43	Killeany	Clocháns		Oghil (Inishmore)	53°07′39″N 9°43′08″W
43	Killeany Tomb	Wedge Tomb		Oghil (Inishmore)	53°07′39″N 9°43′08″W
43	Onaght	Castle & house site		Onaght (Inishmore)	53°08′24″N 9°46′36″W
43	Onaght	Clocháns		Onaght (Inishmore)	53°08′32″N 9°45′37″W
43	Kilcholan Church	Church		Onaght (Inishmore)	53°08′25″N 9°46′33″W
43	Onaght Cashel	Cashel		Onaght (Inishmore)	53°08′24″N 9°46′36″W
43	Templebrecan	Early Medieval Ecclesiastical Site		Onaght (Inishmore)	53°08′46″N 9°46′39″W
231	Killursa	Church		Ower	53°28′04″N 9°08′42″W
462	Pallas Castle	Castle		Pallas (Tynagh)	53°07′36″N 8°21′44″W
48	Kilbennen	Church & Round Tower		Pollacorragune	53°32′20″N 8°53′31″W
461	Portumna Abbey	Friary (Dominican)		Portumna Demesne	53°05′10″N 8°13′03″W
515	Portumna Castle	Castle		Portumna Demesne	53°05′12″N 8°13′14″W
46	Roscam	Early Medieval Ecclesiastical Site		Roscam	53°15′51″N 8°59′06″W
50	Ross Errilly Abbey	Friary (Franciscan)		Headford	53°28′47″N 9°07′54″W
242	Saint Macdara's Island	Early Medieval Ecclesiastical Site		Saint Macdara's Island	53°18′16″N 9°55′02″W
643	Tonaroasty	Deserted Medieval Village		Tonaroasty	53°11′36″N 8°32′47″W
505	Tuam High Cross	High Cross		Tuam	53°30′49″N 8°51′19″W
431	Pearse's Cottage	House with historic associations		Turlough	53°23′10″N 9°37′12″W
327	Turoe stone	Sculptured Stone		Bullaun	53°15′10″N 8°33′42″W

== Sources ==
- "National Monuments in State Care: Ownership & Guardianship: Galway" (PDF). National Monuments Service. 4 March 2009. Archived (PDF) from the original on 14 November 2017.
