= Creggankeel Fort =

Ancient fort in the Aran Islands, Ireland

- Dún an Chreagáin Chaoil (Irish)
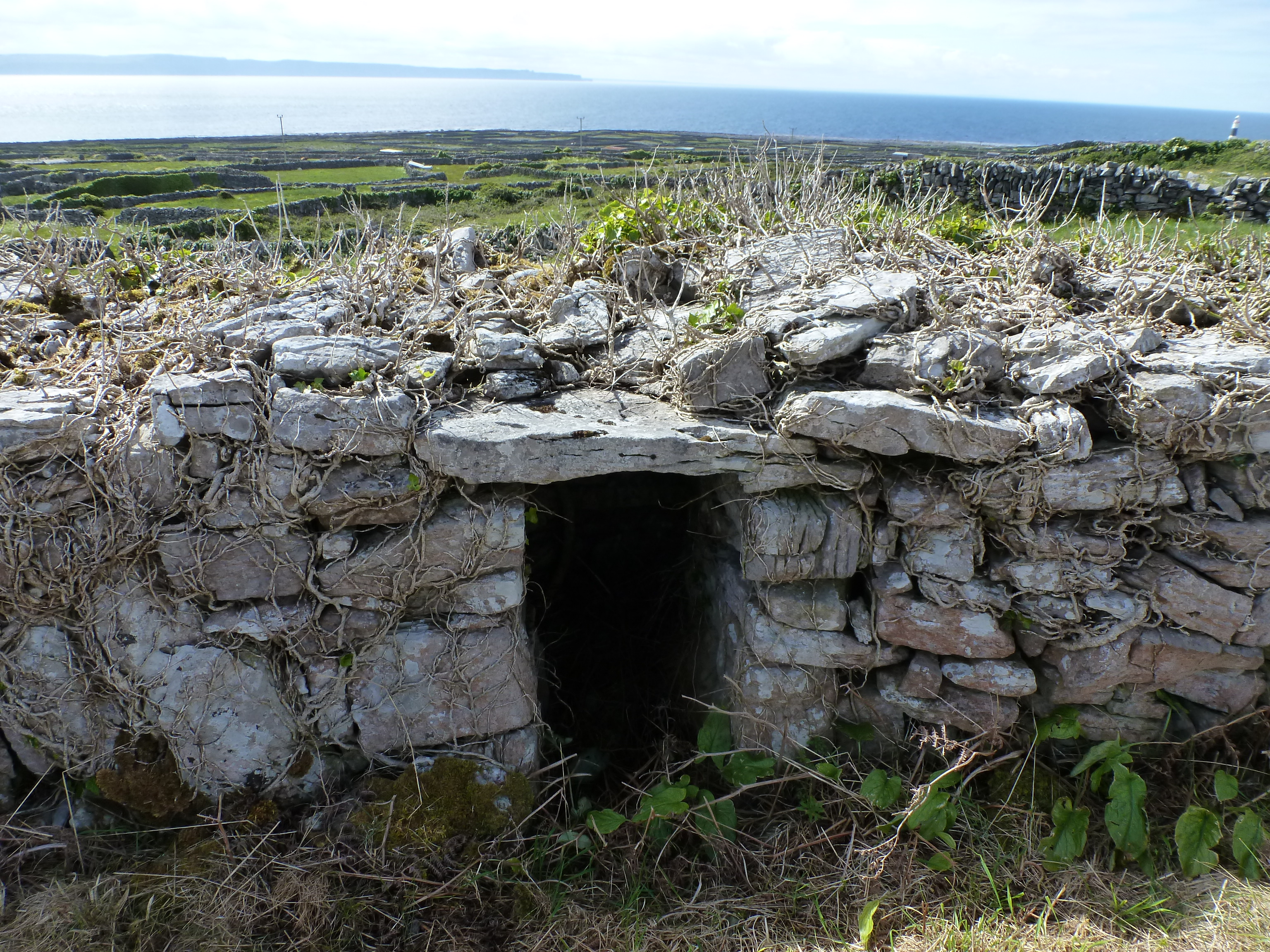
- Entrance to Cill na Seacht nIníon

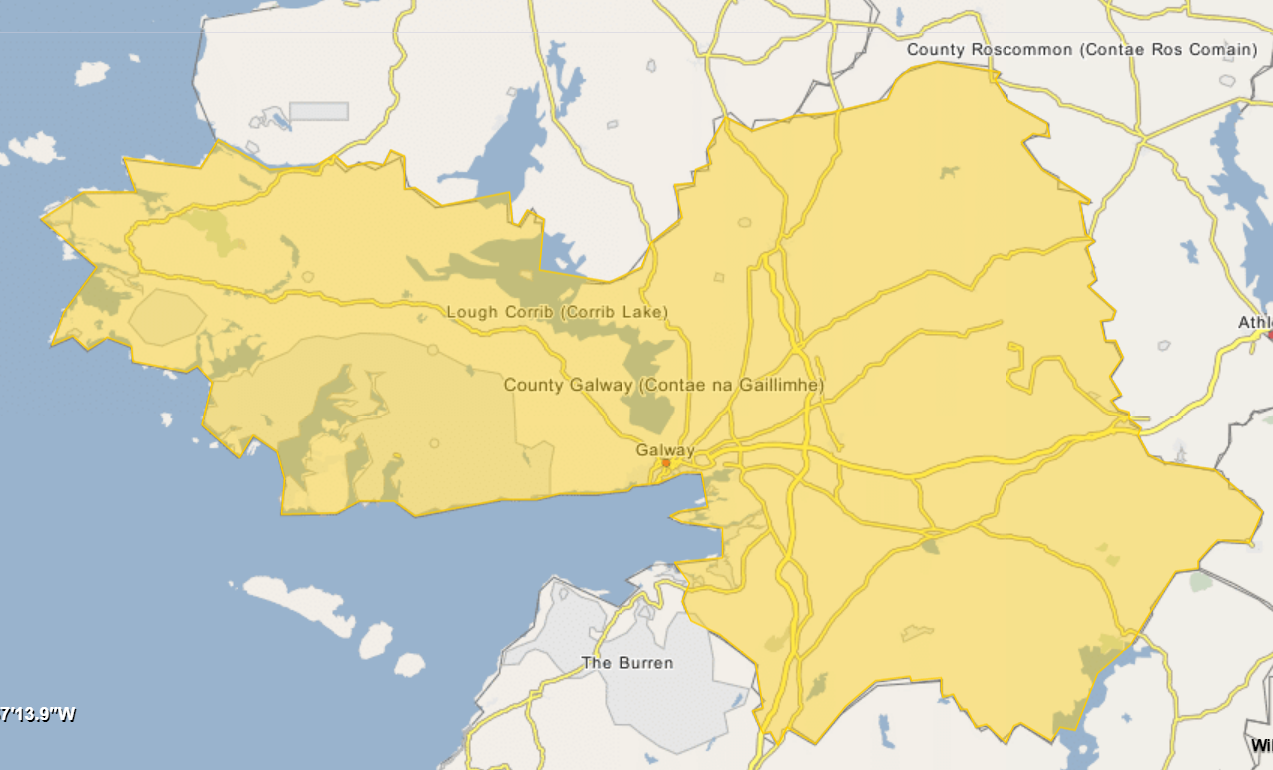
- Location within County Galway
- 53.057213°N 9.518475°W
- Type: Stone fort (cashel) and monastic enclosure
- Location: Inisheer, County Galway, Ireland
- Region: The Burren, Aran Islands

History
- Built: After 100 BC

Site notes
- Material: limestone
- Owner: Office of Public Works
- Public access: yes
- National monument of Ireland

Creggankeel Fort is a stone fort and National Monument located on the island of Inisheer, Ireland. It also contains a later Christian site, the Grave of the Seven Daughters.

== Location ==
Creggankeel Fort is located in the eastern part of Inisheer, overlooking An Loch Mór (the Great Lake, the only freshwater on the island).

== History ==
The name Creggankeel derives from the Irish creagáin chaoil, "narrow stony place." Stone forts ("cashels") of this type were mostly built in Ireland after the 1st century BC. The walls were reused in the 15th century as part of the outer walls of O'Brien's Castle.

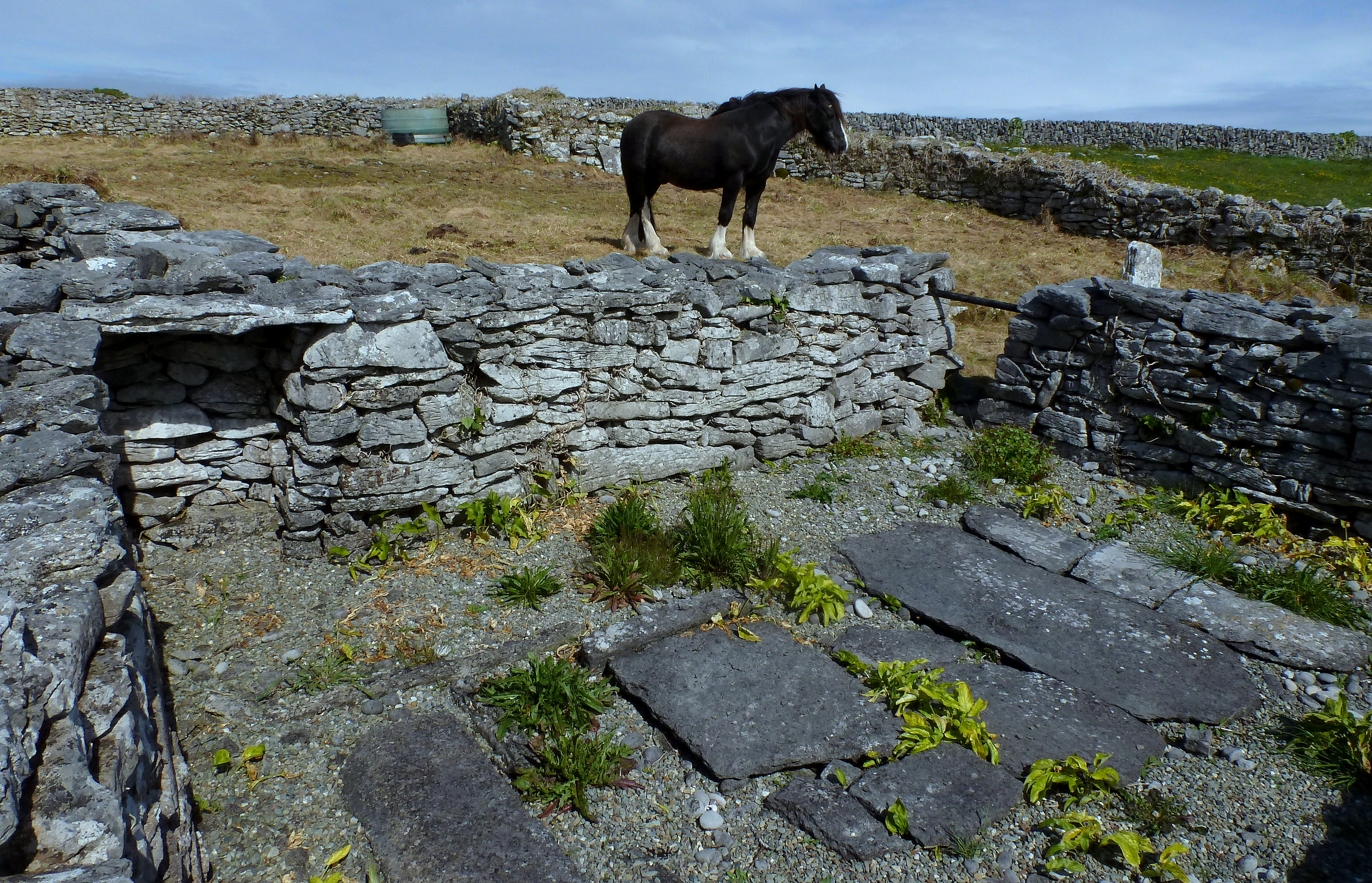
View of the Grave of the Seven Daughters, with stone graveslabs

The Grave of the Seven Daughters (Cill na Seacht nIníon), also called An Chill Bheannaithe (the blessed graveyard) is an early Christian site associated with the female saint Moninne. It was established around the 5th or 6th century AD.

== Description ==
The fort is formed from two square drystone walls with a cross inscribed onto a pillar-stone. The Grave of the Seven Daughters is the incomplete circuit of a cashel; there are sleeping niches in the walls reminiscent of the Roman catacombs. The foundations of other buildings are also evident.

Nearby is a structure similar to one seen at Cashelmore (Clogher), County Sligo.
