= Cnoc Raithní =

Ancient monument on Inisheer, Ireland

- Knockgrannie, Knockgrannary, Cnoc Raithnighe
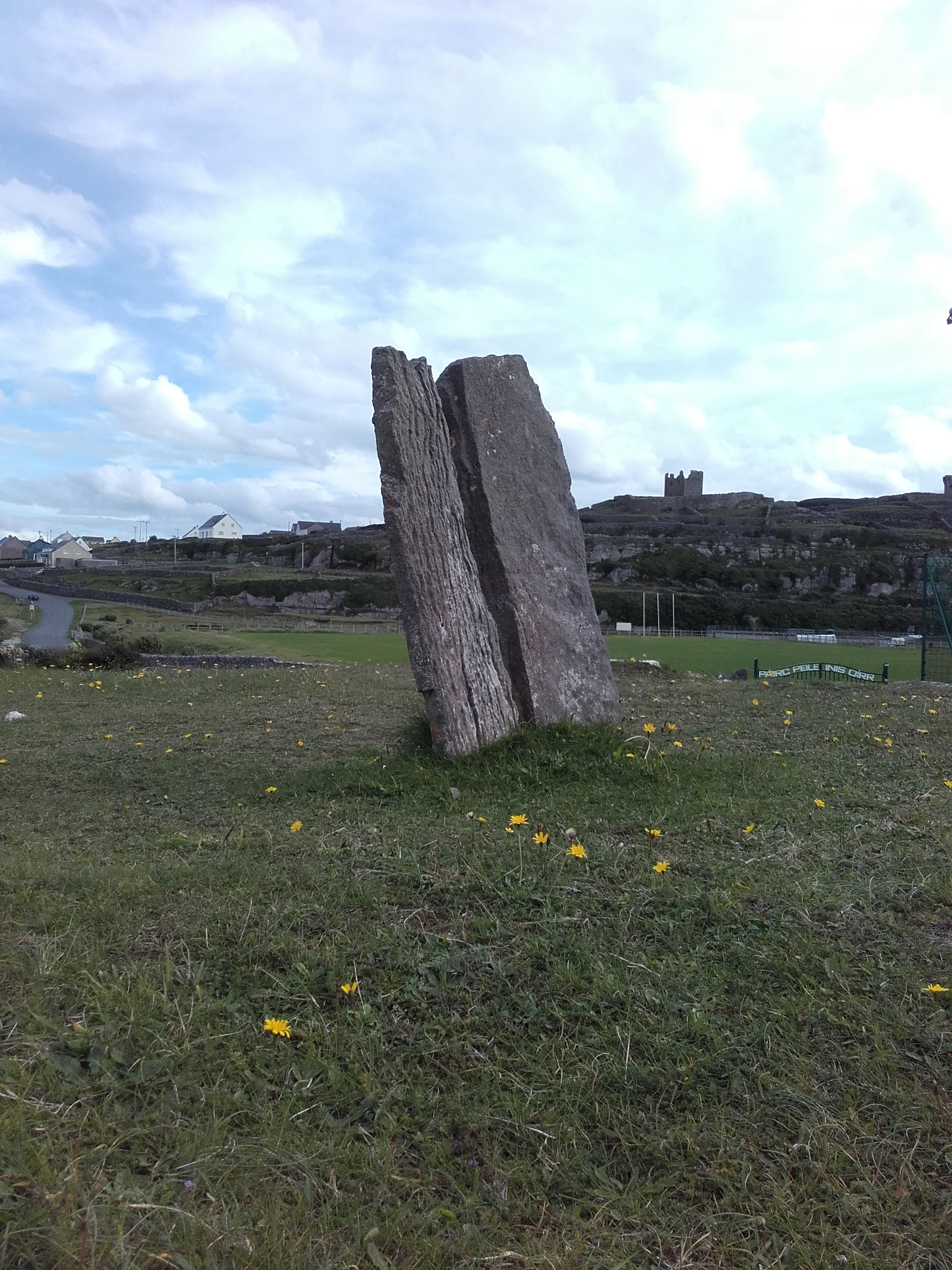
- Slab atop Cnoc Raithní

- Location within Ireland
- 53.065019°N 9.523220°W
- Type: tumulus
- Periods: Atlantic Bronze Age
- Location: Inisheer, County Galway, Ireland
- Region: The Burren, Aran Islands

History
- Built: c. 1500 BC

Site notes
- Material: earth, sand, limestone
- Height: 1.5 m (4.9 ft)
- Area: 350 m^{2} (0.086 acres)
- Diameter: 21 m (69 ft)
- Owner: Office of Public Works
- Public access: yes
- National monument of Ireland

Cnoc Raithní (Irish: [ˌknˠɔk ˈɾˠahnʲiː]; "hill of bracken") is a tumulus (burial mound) and national monument located on Inisheer, Ireland.

== Location ==
Cnoc Raithní is located on the northern edge of Inisheer, overlooking the harbour.

== History ==
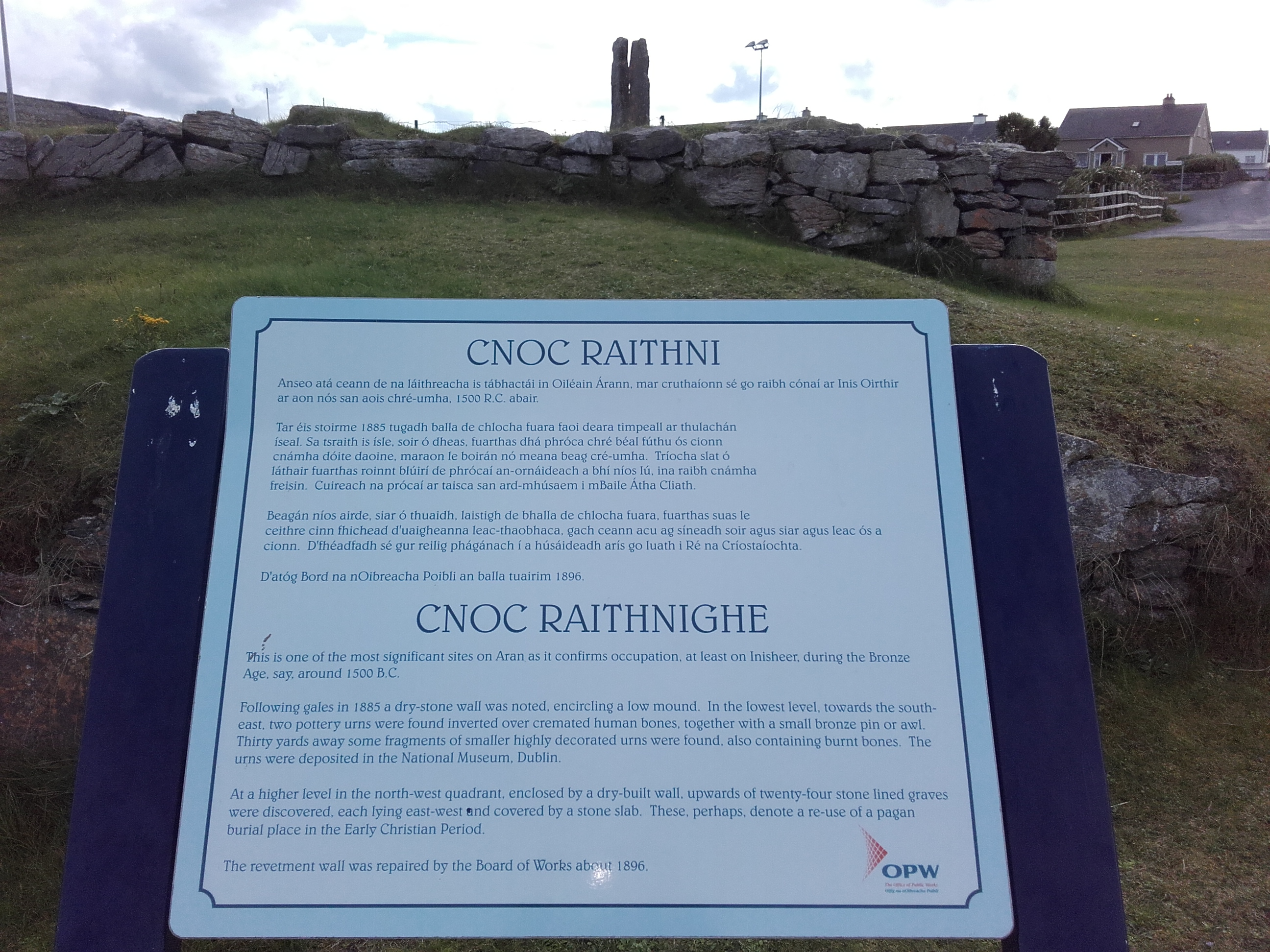
Information sign

The lower tier is dated to c. 2000–1500 BC, making this the earliest known settlement site on the island. The upper part is believed to be Early Christian (5th to 8th centuries AD).

The site was covered by sands before being exposed by a storm in 1885; in that year, it was excavated by D. Murphy and cordoned cinerary urns with cremated bones and a bronze awl were found.

== Description ==
A circular sandy mound revetted by a drystone wall. About 27 slab-lined graves protrude above the south half. The north half is occupied by a kerbed platform with two limestone pillars.
