= Caomhán of Inisheer =

Patron saint of Inisheer

Coordinates: 53.064°N 9.514°W

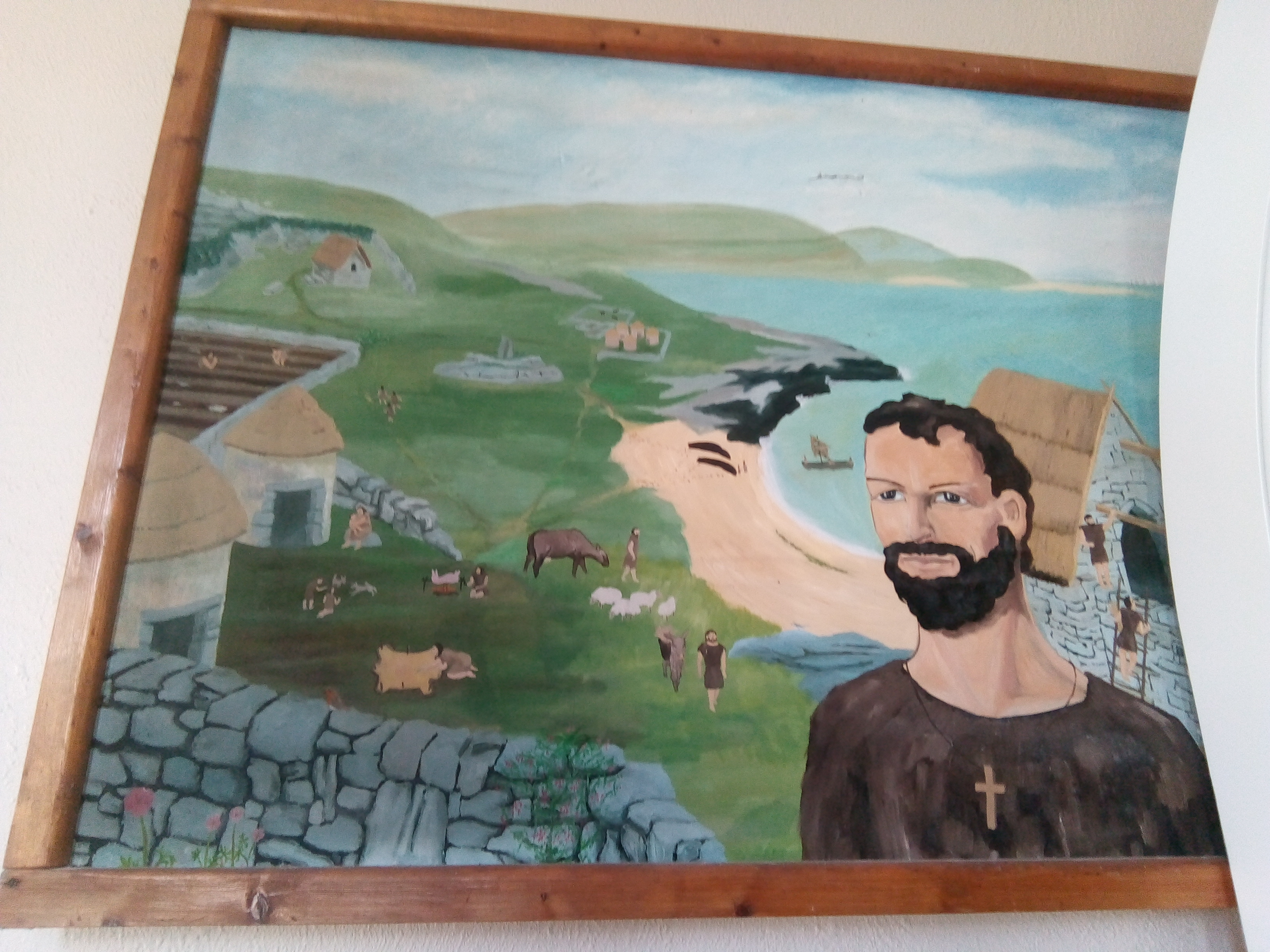
- Painting on Inisheer
- Born: Caomhán
- Hometown: Inisheer
- Died: possibly 865
- Venerated in: Catholic Church, Church of Ireland
- Feast: 14 June (formerly 3 November)
- Patronage: Inisheer

Saint Caomhán (Irish pronunciation: [ˈkeːwaːn̪ˠ]; may have died in 865), anglicised as Cavan, sometimes Kevin, is the patron saint of Inisheer (Irish: Inis Oírr), the smallest of the Aran Islands. Although he is "by far the most celebrated of all the saints of the Aran Islands", little is known about him. He is said to have been a disciple of Saint Enda of Aran.

The saint's Pattern Day (Irish: Lá an Phátrúin) was formerly 3 November, but was moved to 14 June in the 19th century. There used to be a pilgrimage of the sick to his tomb on his day, and an open-air mass is still celebrated there every year.

== St Cavan's Church ==
St Cavan's Church (also "St Kevin's Church", Irish: Teampall Chaomháin) is a ruined church, built in the 10th century, at the location of the saint's grave. The entrance is now below ground level, as the church was nearly buried by drifting sands; it has been excavated and is kept clear of sand by the islanders. In recent times it has been roofed to resist the incursion of blown sand from the surrounding dunes. All that remains visible of this structure today is the chancel. A century or so after this was built, the rest of the building gave way for a wider nave. The lintel over the original western doorway was reused in the enlarged building to become the entrance from the nave to the priest's residence. Three other features date from the late medieval period: the head of the chancel arch, the pointed doorway in the south wall of the nave and the priest's residence.

The grave of St Caomhan (Irish: Leaba Chaomháin or "Caomhán's Bed") is located to the northeast of the church. It is a tradition on the island to spend the vigil of the saint's feast praying at his grave. It has been written that people were cured of illness here.

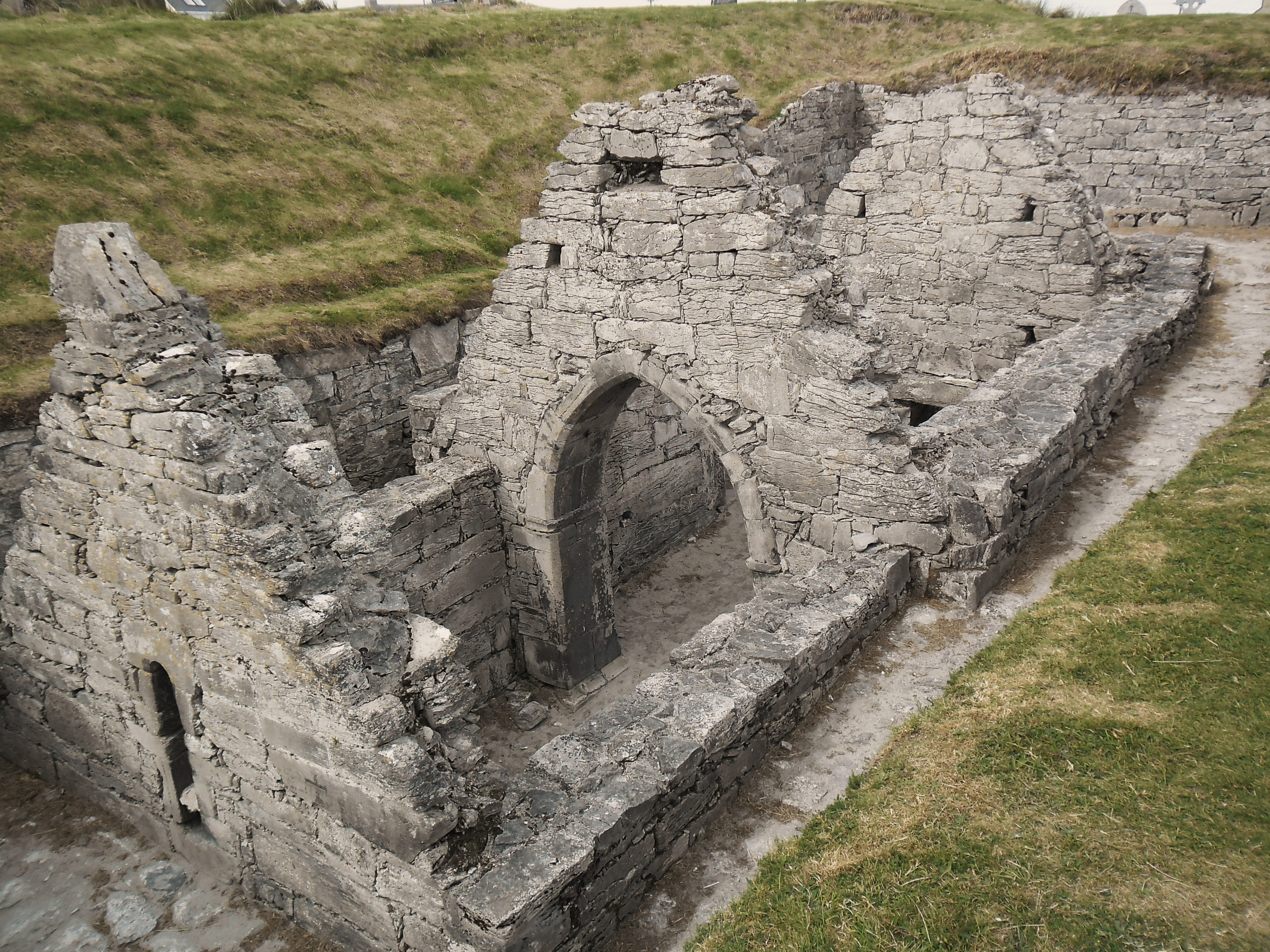
The ruins of Saint Caomhan's church, Inisheer (2011 photograph)

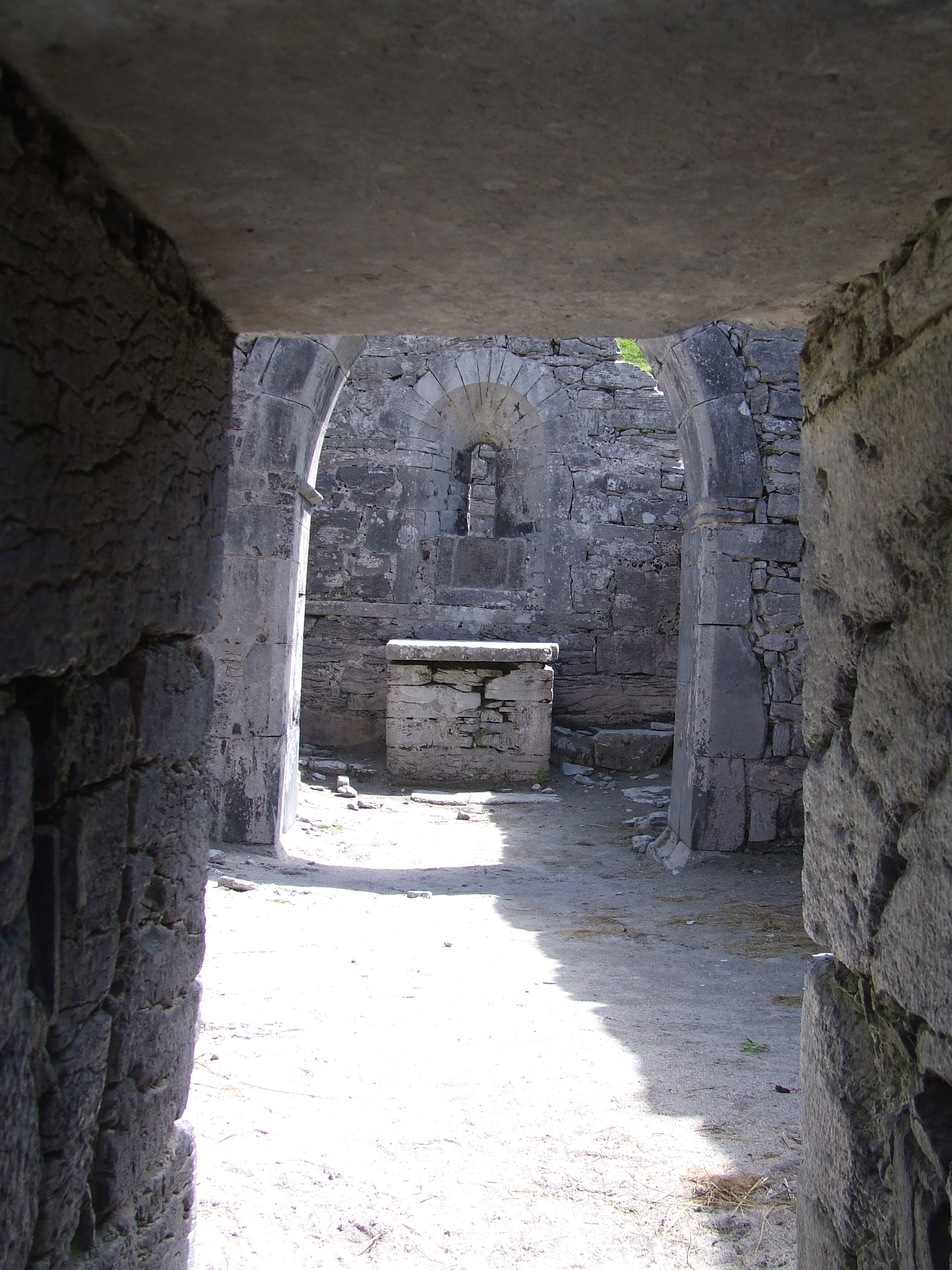
Saint Caomhan's church, viewed from the priest's residence in the west through the nave and chancel arch to the altar in the east.

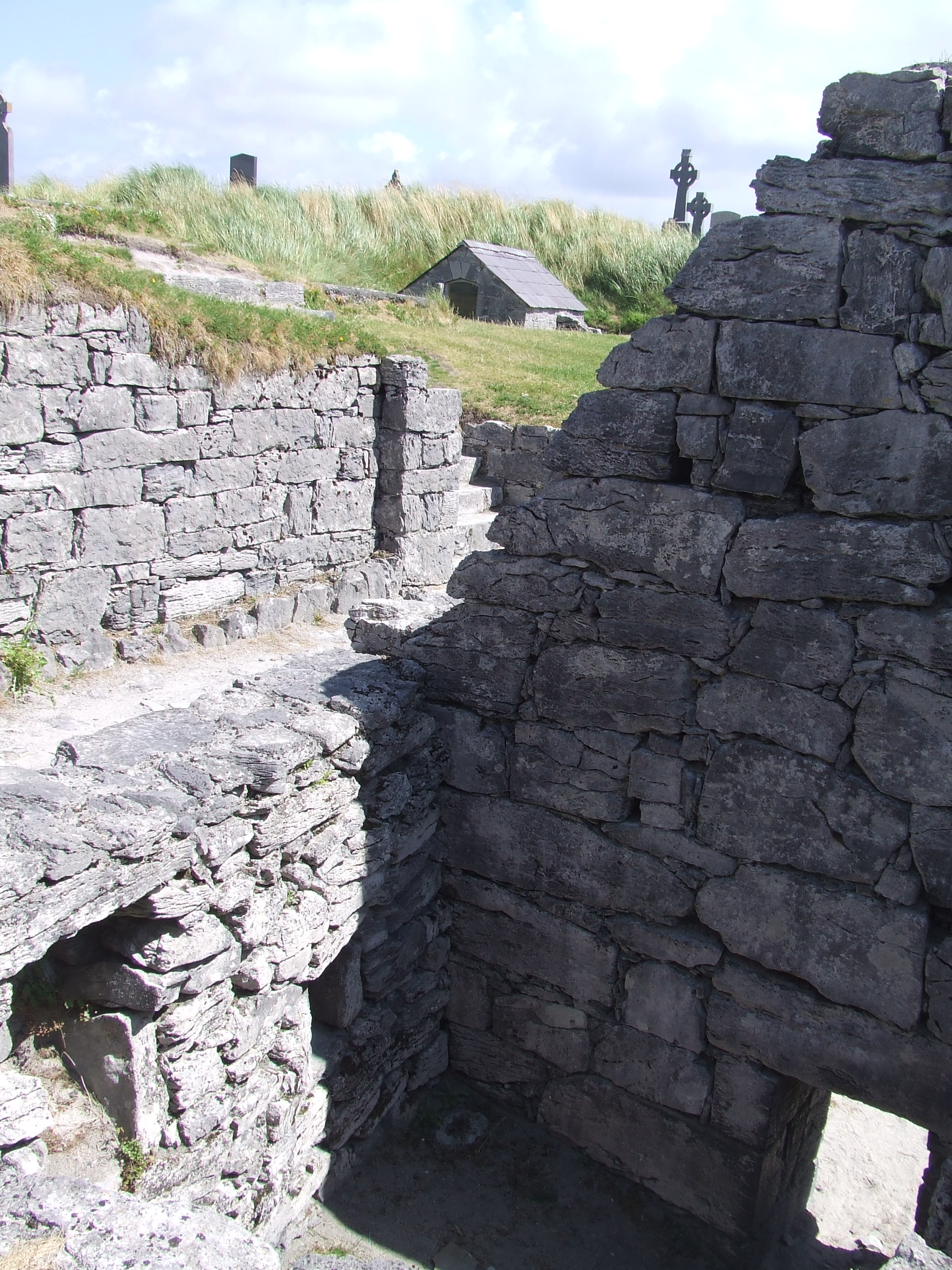
Saint Caomhan's church with Caomhan's grave (Leaba Chaomháin) in the background.

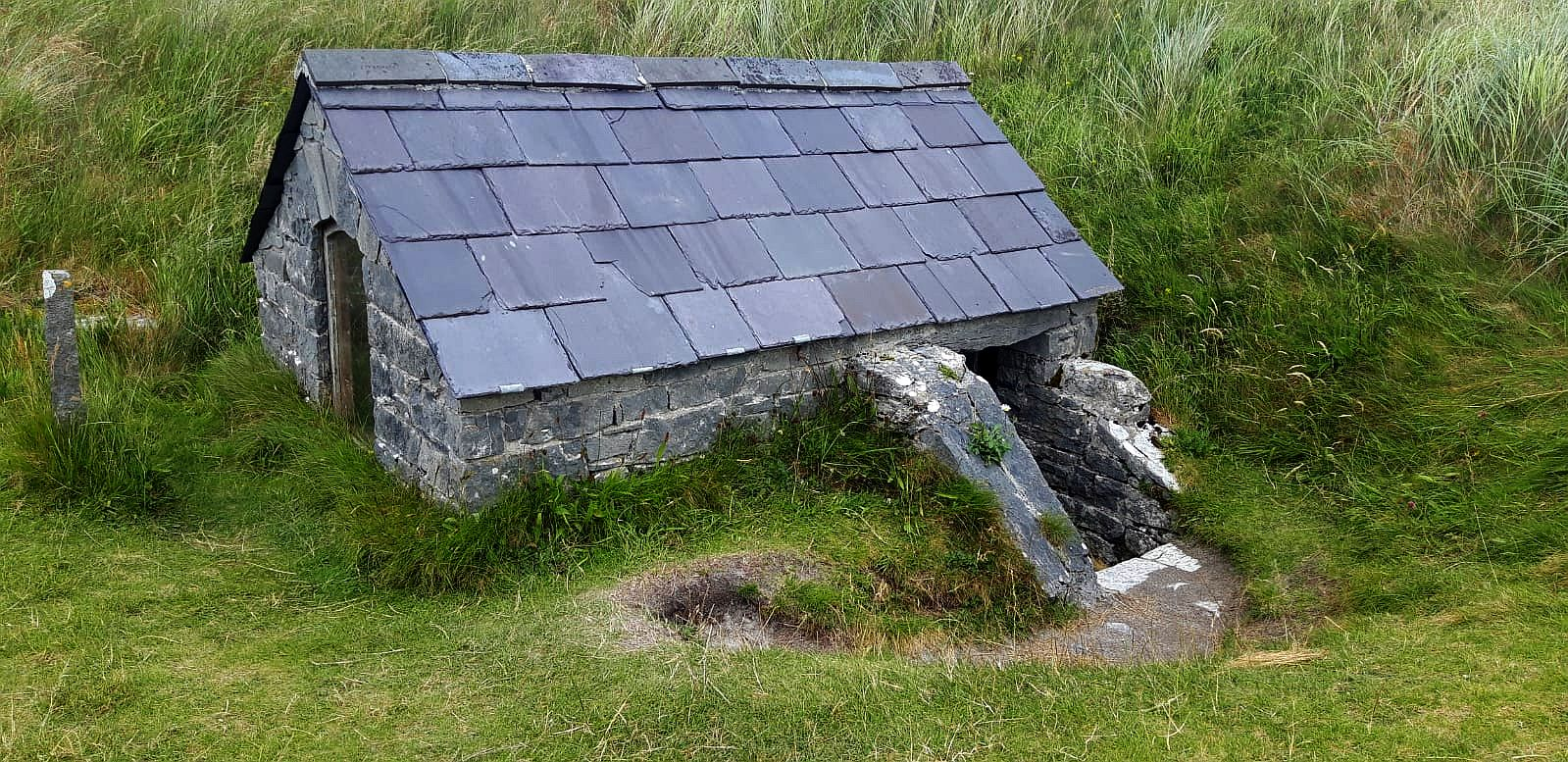
Saint Caomhan's grave (Leaba Chaomháin) in Inisheer cemetery

== Modern church ==
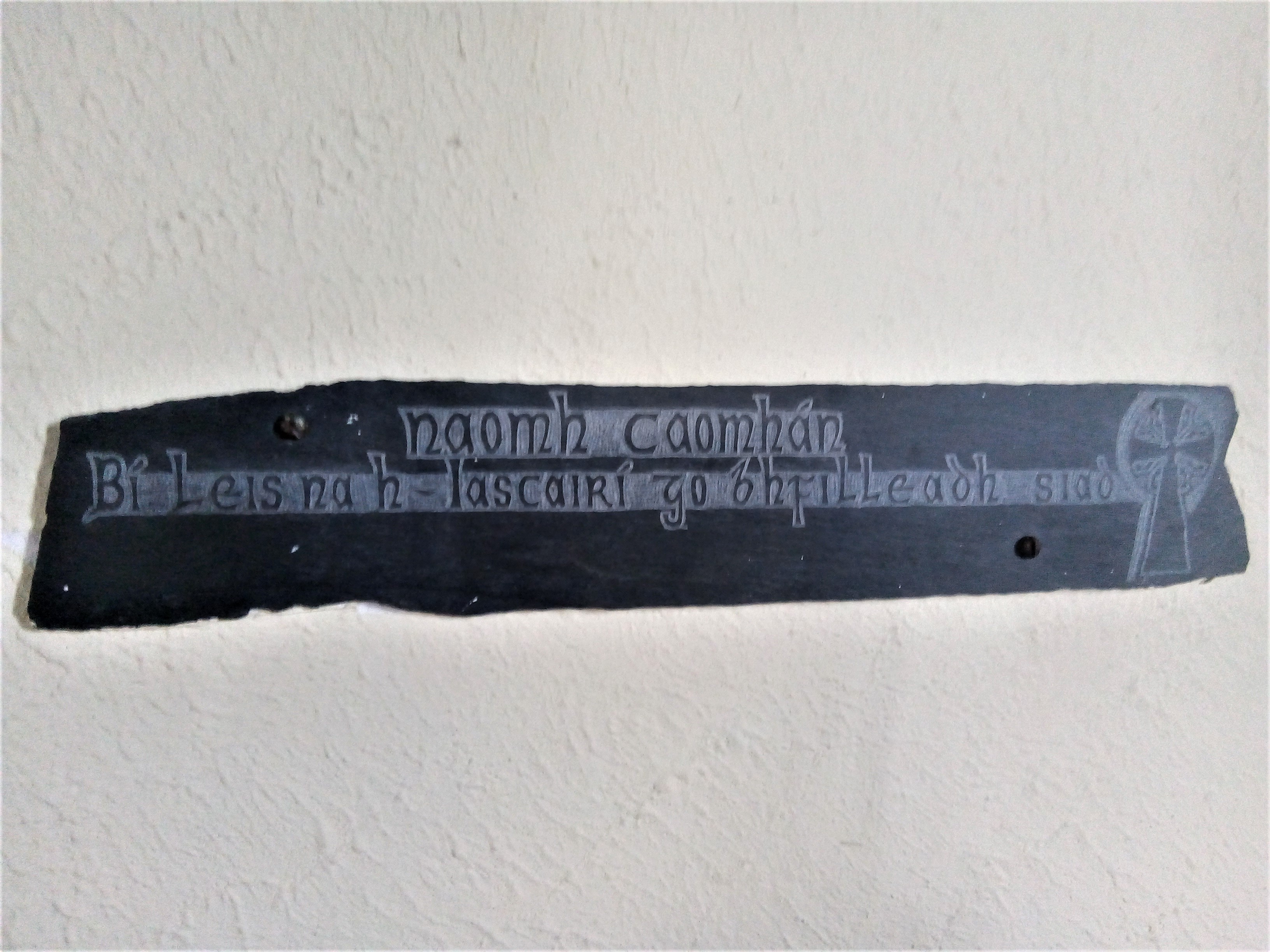
Plaque in the modern church (Irish: "Saint Caomhán, be with the fisherman that they might return.")

The modern Séipéal Naomh Caomhán was built around 1901.
