= St. Gobnet's Church =

- St. Gobnait's Church, An Teampall Beag, Kilgobnet
- Cill Ghobnait
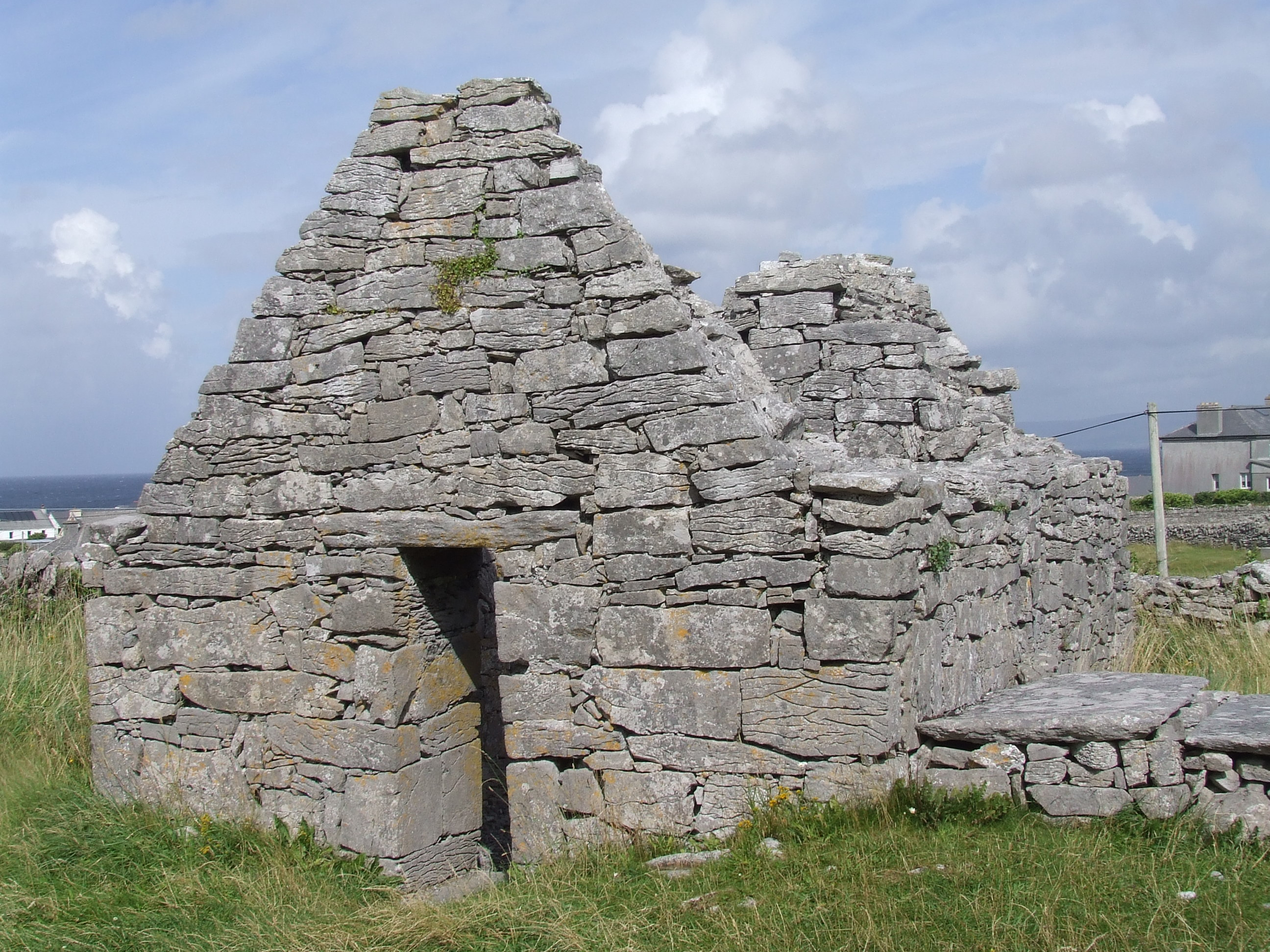

- Location within Ireland
- 53.065908°N 9.529201°W
- Location: Inisheer, County Galway
- Country: Ireland
- Denomination: Pre-Reformation Catholic

History
- Founded: 6th century
- Founder: Gobnait

Architecture
- Functional status: inactive
- Years built: c. 1100

Specifications
- Materials: limestone

Administration
- Diocese: Tuam
Designations
National monument of Ireland
- Official name: St. Gobnet's Church
- Reference no.: 41.05

St. Gobnet's Church is a medieval church and National Monument located on Inisheer, Ireland.

== Location ==
St. Gobnet's Church is located in the northern part of Inisheer, in the Aran Islands.

== History ==
The site is believed to have been in use since the 6th century. According to traditional tales, Saint Gobnait fled from County Clare to Inisheer to escape a family feud. Later, an angel appeared to her and told her to return to the mainland and go south until she saw nine white deer; she settled at Ballyvourney and built a religious community. The remains of her beehive hut are said to be on Inisheer. The stone church was built in the 11th or 12th century.

The church was excavated in 1980 by W. Walsh.

== Church ==
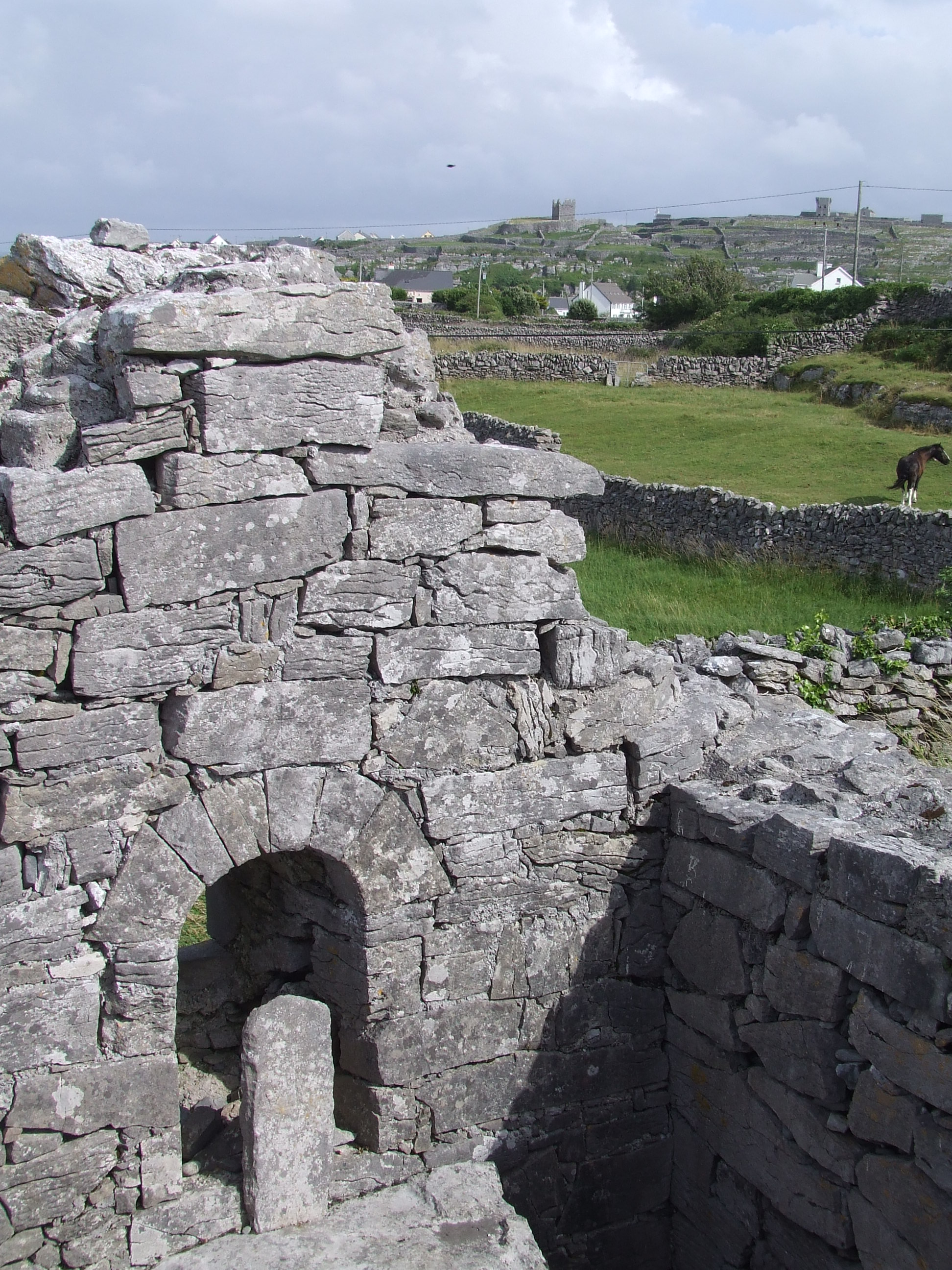
North window

A rectangular stone church. The remains of a beehive hut are visible; there are also two bullaun stones and three raised stone slabs.
