= Inisheer =

Island off the west coast of Ireland

Native name: Inis Oírr
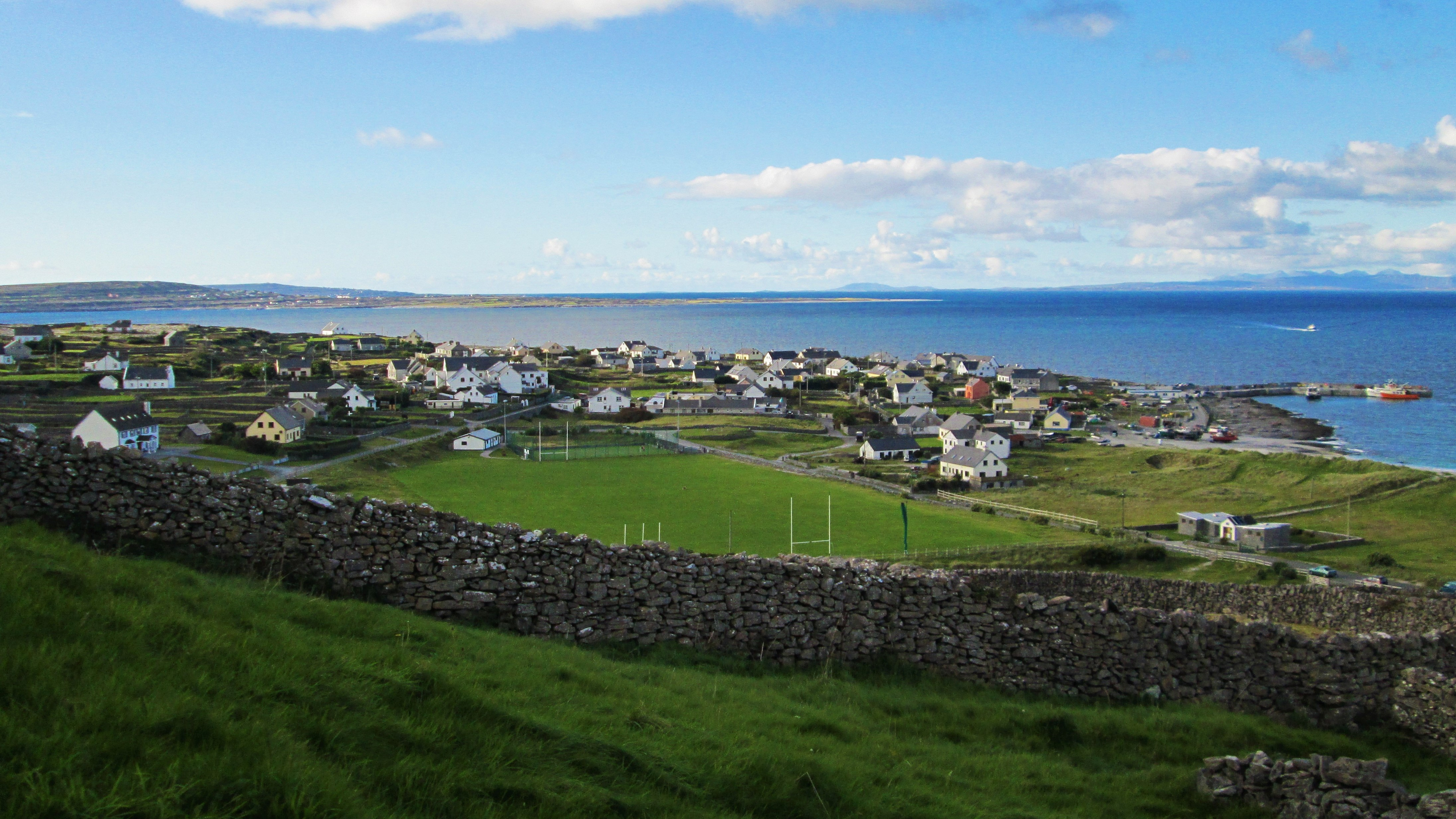

- Location within island of Ireland

Geography
- Location: Atlantic Ocean
- Coordinates: 53°03′29″N 9°31′39″W
- Area: 1,448 acres (586 ha)
- Highest elevation: 62 m (203 ft)

Administration
- Ireland
- Province: Connacht
- County: Galway

Demographics
- Population: 343 (2022)
- Pop. density: 48/km^{2} (124/sq mi)

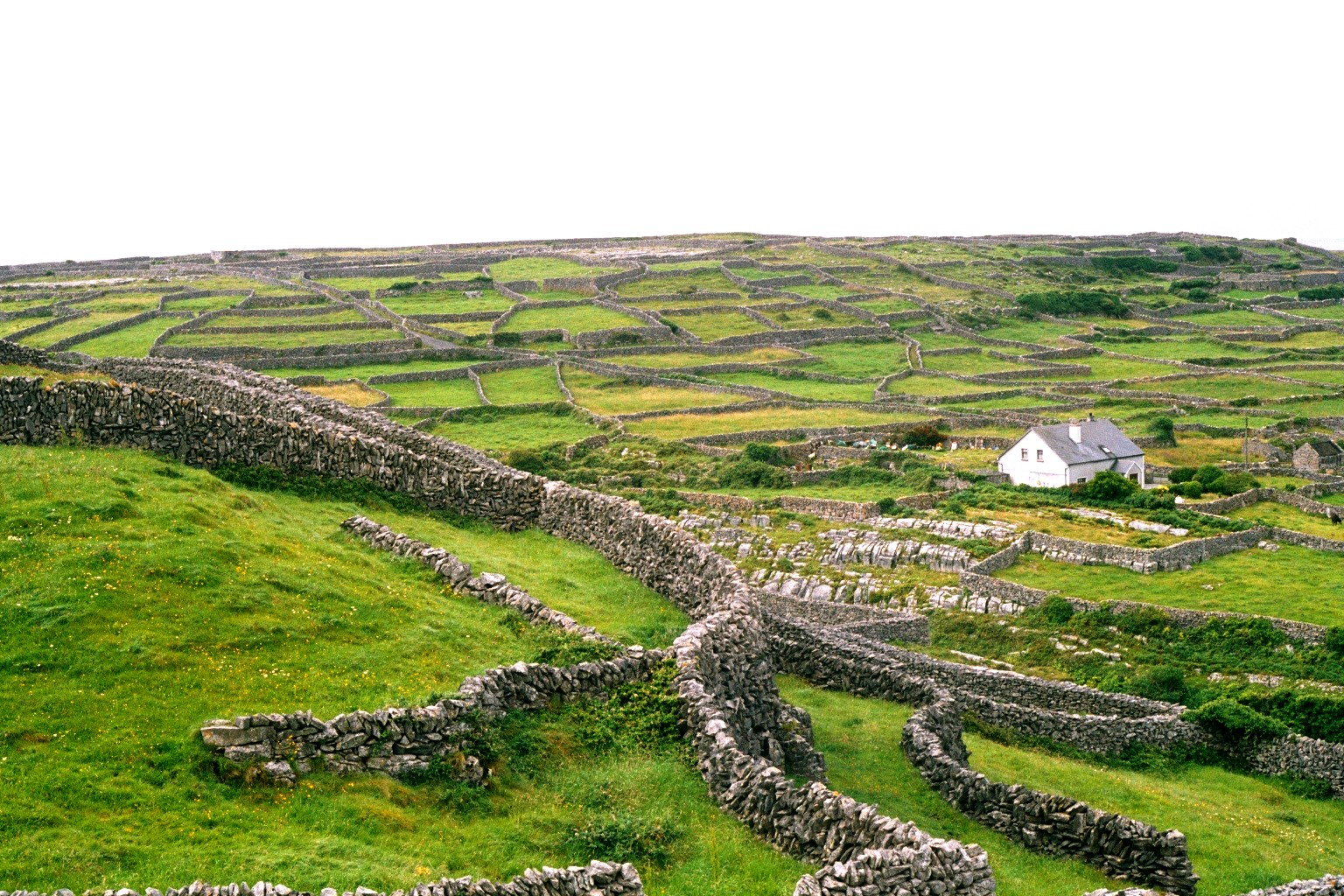
Inisheer landscape

Inisheer (Irish: Inis Oírr [ˈɪnʲɪʃ iːɾˠ], Inis Thiar [ˈɪnʲɪʃ hiəɾˠ] or Inis Oirthir [ˈɪnʲɪʃ ˈɛɾʲhəɾʲ]) is the smallest and most easterly of the three Aran Islands in Galway Bay, Ireland. With 343 residents as of the 2022 census, it is second-most populous of the Arans. Caomhán of Inis Oírr is the island's patron saint. There are five small settlements: Baile Thiar, Chapeltown (Baile an tSéipéil), Castle Village (Baile an Chaisleáin), Baile an Fhormna and Baile an Lorgain. The island is in a civil parish of the same name.

== Name ==
The island was originally called Árainn Airthir, and later Inis Oirthir, which are thought to mean "eastern Aran" and "eastern island" respectively. The second element is also found in the names Inishsirrer and Orior. According to Séamas Ó Murchú, the current official name, Inis Oírr, was brought into use by the Ordnance Survey Ireland. He says it may be a compromise between Inis Oirthir and the traditional local name Inis Thiar.

== Geology and geography ==
The island is geologically an extension of The Burren. The terrain of the island is composed of limestone pavements with crisscrossing cracks known as "grikes", leaving isolated rocks called "clints".

The limestones date from the Viséan period (Lower Carboniferous), formed as sediments in a tropical sea approximately 350 million years ago, and compressed into horizontal strata with fossil corals, crinoids, sea urchins and ammonites.

Glaciation following the Namurian phase facilitated greater denudation, resulting in a Glacio-Karst landscape on Inisheer. The effects of the last glacial period (the Midlandian) are most in evidence, with the island overrun by ice during this glaciation. The impact of earlier Karstification (solutional erosion) has been eliminated by the last glacial period, so any Karstification now seen dates from approximately 10,000 years ago.

Solutional processes have widened and deepened the limestone pavement. Pre-existing lines of weakness in the rock (vertical joints) contribute to the formation of extensive fissures separated by clints (flat pavement-like slabs). The rock karstification facilitates the formation of subterranean drainage.

== Climate ==
The island has a temperate climate. Average air temperatures range from 15 °C (59 °F) in July to 6 °C (43 °F) in January. The soil temperature does not usually drop below 6 °C (43 °F). Since grass will grow once the temperature rises above 6 °C (43 °F), this means that the island (like the neighbouring Burren) has one of the longest growing seasons in Ireland, and supports diverse and rich plant growth. Late May is the sunniest time.

== Flora and fauna ==
The island supports arctic, Mediterranean and alpine plants side-by-side, due to the unusual environment. Like the Burren, the Aran islands are known for their remarkable assemblage of plants and animals. The grikes (crevices) provide moist shelter, thus supporting a wide range of plants including dwarf shrubs. Where the surface of the pavement is shattered into gravel, many of the hardier Arctic or alpine plants can be found. But when the limestone pavement is covered by a thin layer of soil, patches of grass are seen, interspersed with plants like the gentian and orchids.

Notable insects present include the butterflies the pearl-bordered fritillary (Boloria euphrosyne), the brown hairstreak (Thecla betulae), the marsh fritillary (Euphydryas aurinia) and the wood white (Leptidea sinapis); the moths the burren green (Calamia tridens), the Irish annulet (Gnophos dumetata) and the transparent burnet (Zygaena purpuralis); and the hoverfly Doros profuges.

== History ==
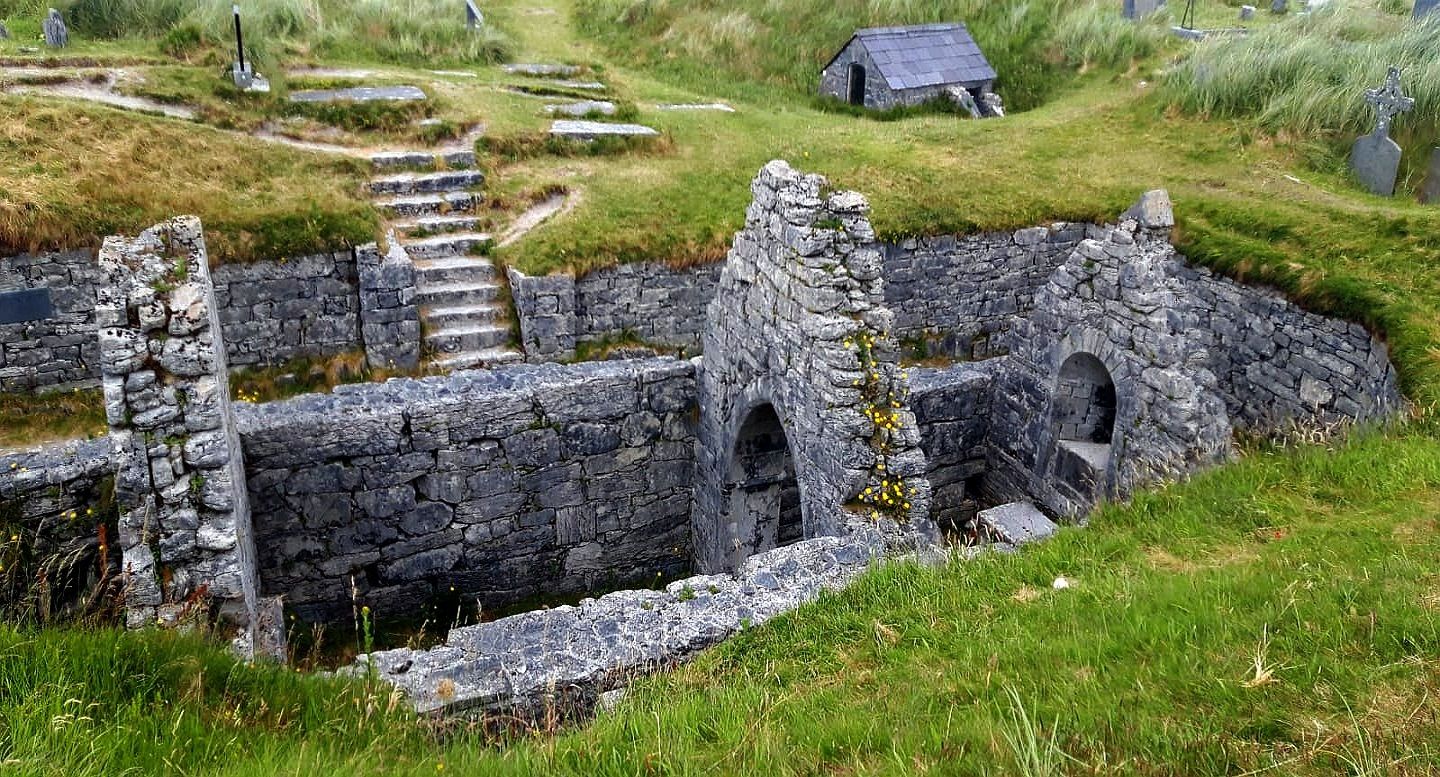
Saint Caomhán's Church (Teampall Chaomháin) in Inisheer cemetery

In 1885 a burial site called Cnoc Raithní was discovered which dates back to 1500 BC. This is the earliest evidence of human settlement of the island.

Saint Caomhán, the patron saint of Inisheer, according to some traditions, was the elder brother of Kevin of Glendalough in County Wicklow. The ruins of the 10th century Teampall Chaomháin in Inisheer cemetery have to be uncovered annually as the floor of it is well below the level of the sand. In the Middle Ages, the island was ruled by the O'Brien dynasty who provided most of the Kings of Thomond. This rule was exercised before the Anglo-Irish settled in Connacht in the 1230s.

The Tribes of Galway paid the O'Briens an annual tribute of twelve tuns of wine "in consideration of their protection and expenses in guarding the bay and harbour of Galway against pirates and coast plunderers." The remains of the 14th-century 'O'Brien's Castle' are sited near the island's highest point. In 1582 the O'Flahertys of Connemara captured it. Today O'Flahertys still live on the island. In 1652 it was given to the Cromwellian invasion force and the O'Flahertys were defeated. They saw no use for it and the castle was partially dismantled, it has been unoccupied since.

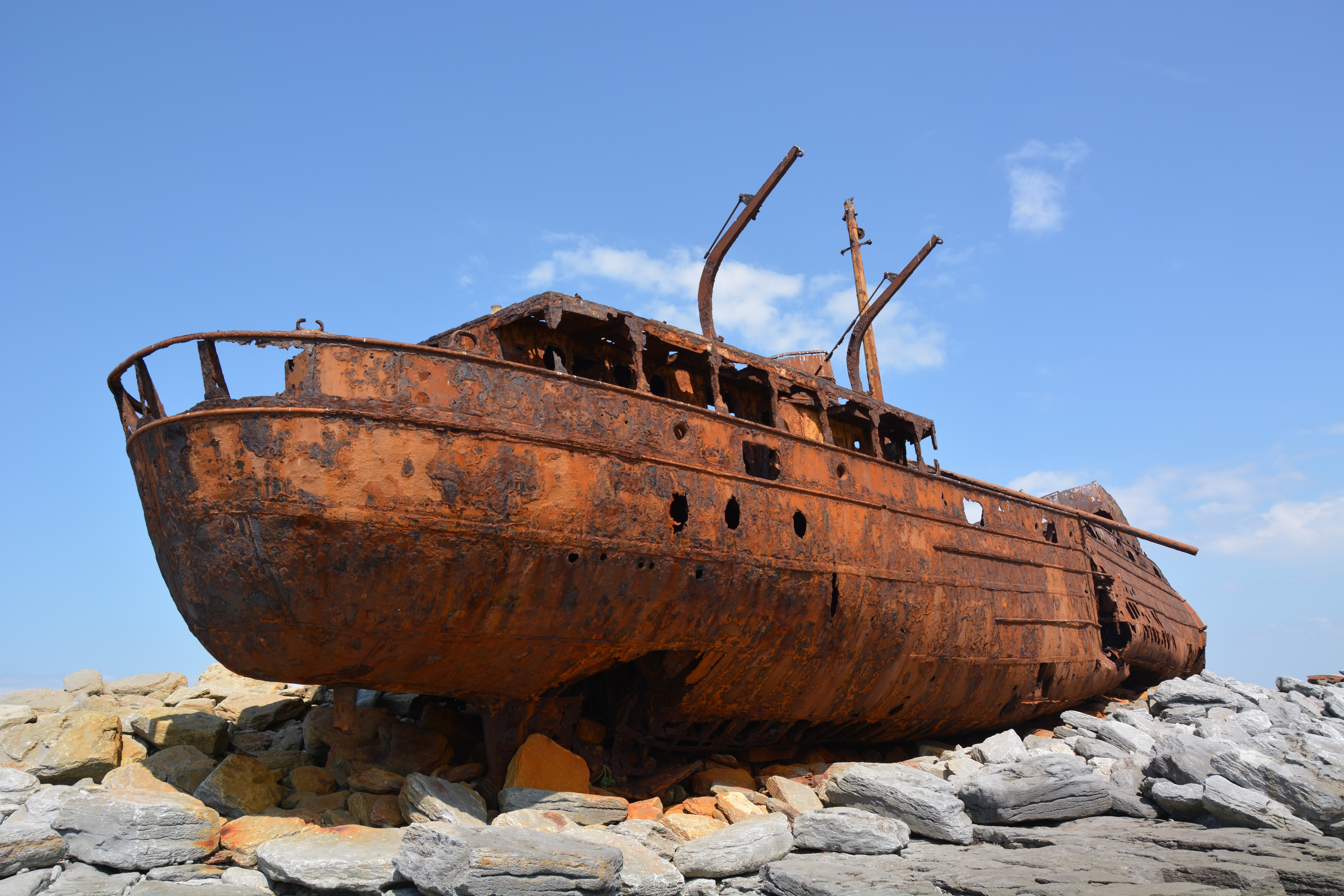
The MV Plassy shipwreck

The cargo vessel MV Plassy, which was shipwrecked off Inis Oírr on 8 March 1960, has since been thrown above the high tide mark at Carraig na Finise on the island by strong Atlantic waves. The wreck features in the opening credits of the TV show Father Ted. On the night of the wrecking, a young boy on the island spotted the grounded ship and ran to the village, where the alarm was raised. Approximately sixty islanders, including the Inisheer Rocket Crew, rescued the entire crew from the stricken vessel using a breeches buoy; an event captured in a pictorial display at the National Maritime Museum in Dún Laoghaire.

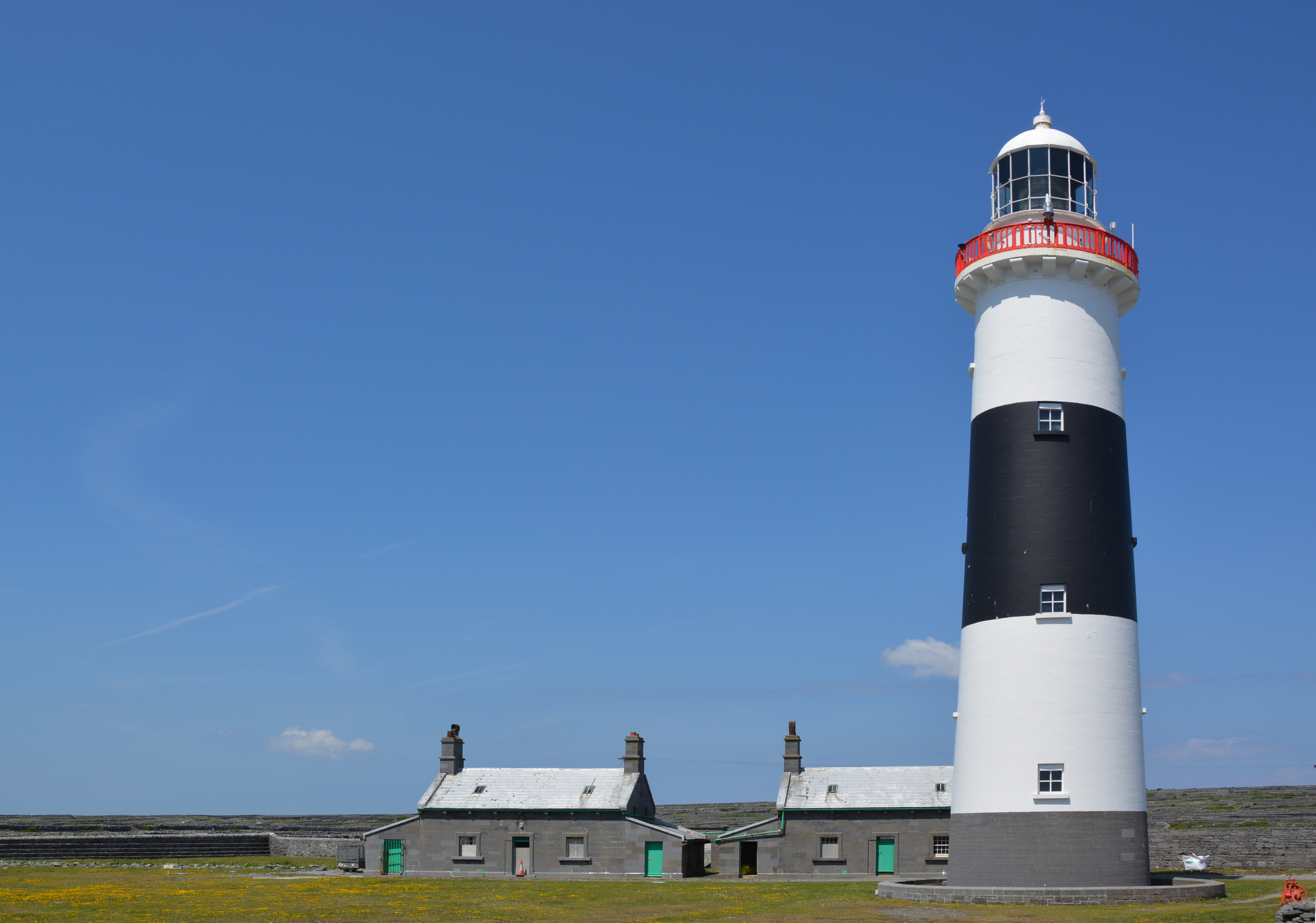
Inisheer Lighthouse located at the southern tip of the island, it was completed in 1857.

=== Antiquities ===
The following sites on the island are designated as National Monuments:

- Creggankeel Fort (NM 41.01)
- Grave of the Seven Daughters (NM 41.02)
- St. Gobnet's Church (NM 41.05)
- Cnoc Raithní (NM 41.06)
- O'Brien's Castle (NM 41.07)
- St. Cavan's Church (NM 41.08)

=== Demographics ===
The table below reports data on Inis Oírr's population taken from Discover the Islands of Ireland (Alex Ritsema, Collins Press, 1999) and the Census of Ireland. Census data in Ireland before 1841 are not considered complete and/or reliable.

Historical population

Year	Pop.	±%
1841	456	—
1851	518	+13.6%
1861	532	+2.7%
1871	495	−7.0%
1881	497	+0.4%
1891	455	−8.5%
1901	483	+6.2%
1911	480	−0.6%
1926	409	−14.8%

Year	Pop.	±%
1936	445	+8.8%
1946	447	+0.4%
1951	388	−13.2%
1956	376	−3.1%
1961	358	−4.8%
1966	345	−3.6%
1971	313	−9.3%
1979	257	−17.9%
1981	239	−7.0%

Year	Pop.	±%
1986	255	+6.7%
1991	270	+5.9%
1996	274	+1.5%
2002	262	−4.4%
2006	247	−5.7%
2011	249	+0.8%
2016	281	+12.9%
2022	343	+22.1%

Source: Central Statistics Office. "CNA17: Population by Off Shore Island, Sex and Year". CSO.ie.

== Transport ==
The island is reached by ferry from Rossaveal in Connemara and Doolin in County Clare as well as from the other Aran Islands. There is also a regional airport on each island which is served from Connemara Regional Airport by Aer Arann Islands. A pier was opened in Doolin in June 2015 for commercial ferries serving the island. Islanders travel by foot or car around the island. Tourists can avail of tours/taxi trips by horse and trap.

== Language ==
According to responses to the 2022 census, Irish is used as a daily language by approximately 260 of the island's 340 permanent residents. In addition, a number of school pupils from the mainland come to the island to learn Irish in an environment where it is a living language in the local college, Coláiste Laichtín, during the months of June, July and August.

== Sport ==
Some of the limestone sea cliffs have attracted interest from rock climbers, though the bigger islands of Inis Mór and Inis Meáin are more popular. Diving is possible.

== In the media ==
The island, including shots of the wrecked MV Plassy, is used to represent the fictional Craggy Island in the opening credits of the 1990s sitcom Father Ted.

Inisheer is also the name of a well-known slow air written by Thomas Walsh from Dublin, after a visit to the island in the 1970s.

Inis Oírr was discussed at length in the work of cultural anthropologist John Cowan Messenger under the name Inis Beag.

== Gallery ==
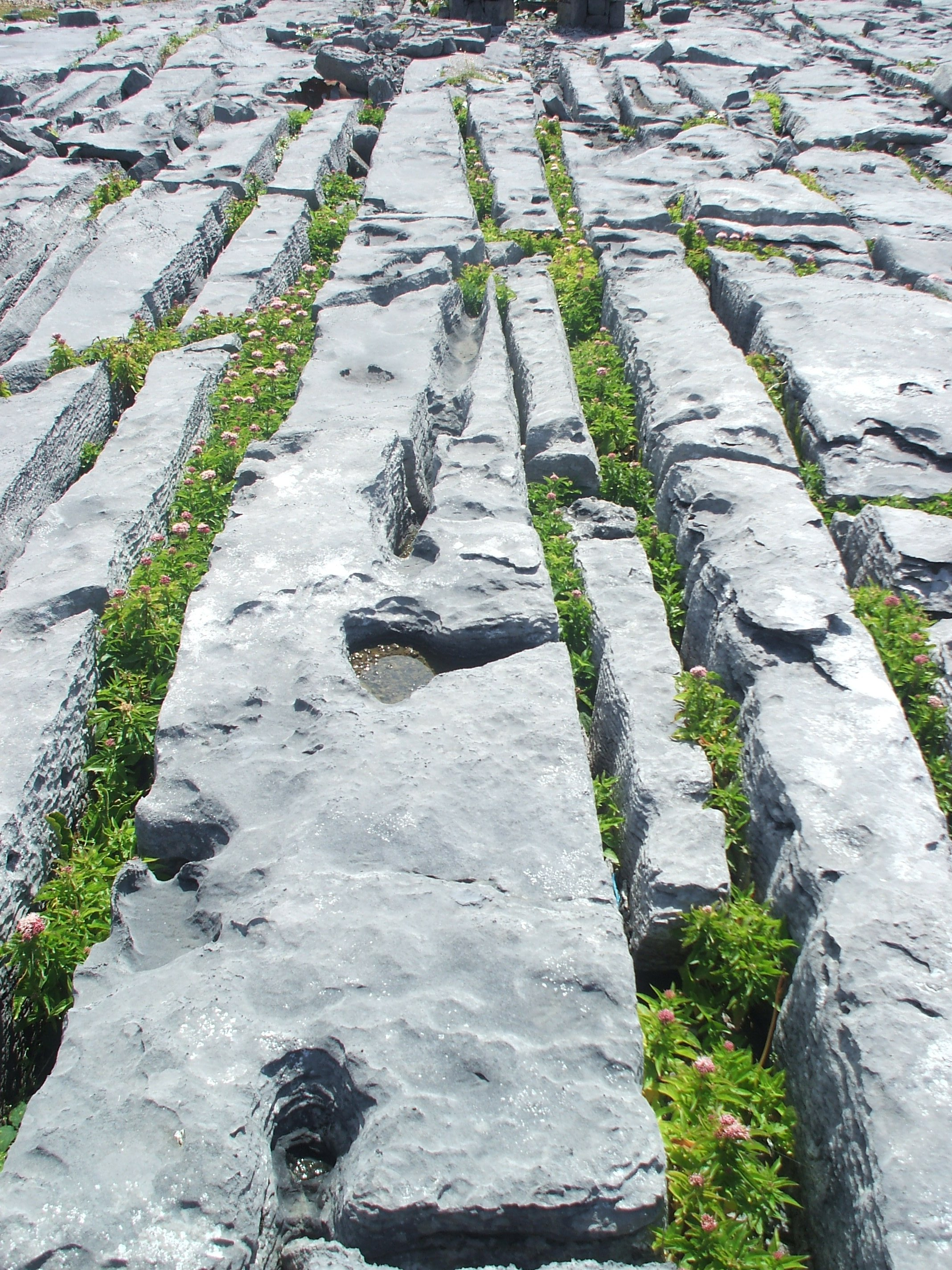
Limestone pavement

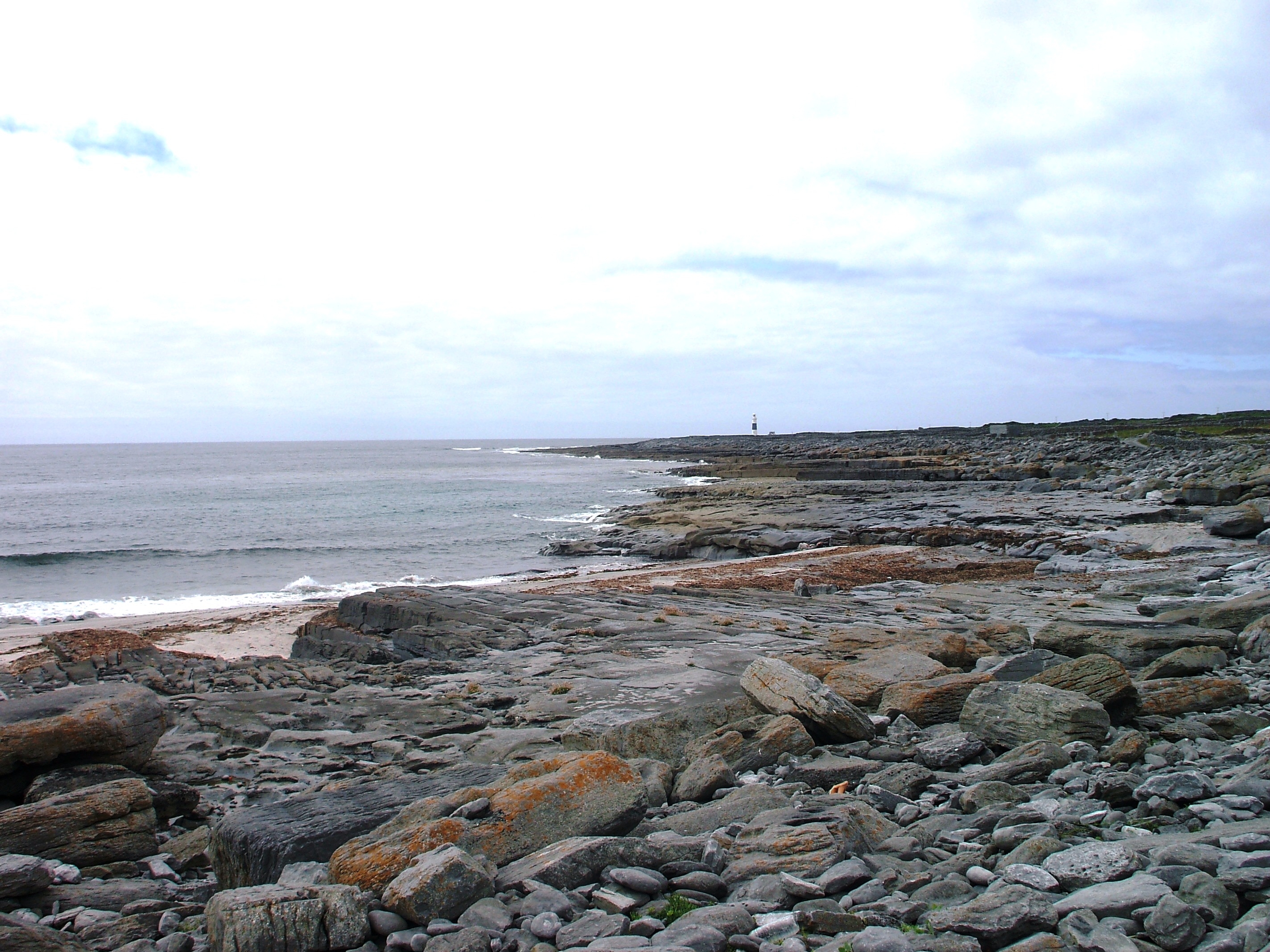
Eastern coastline

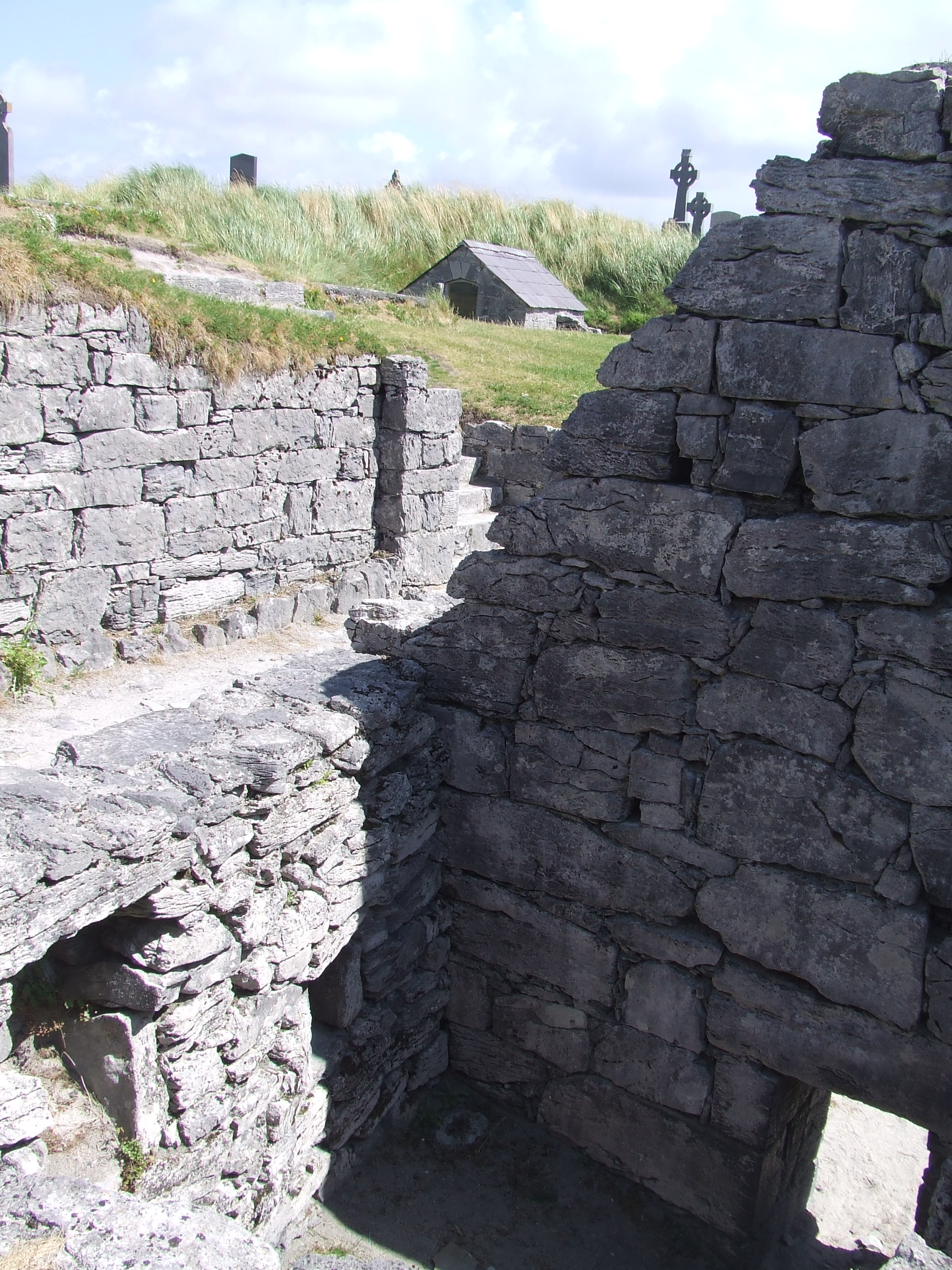
Saint Caomhan's church with Caomhan's grave (Leaba Caomhan) in the background.

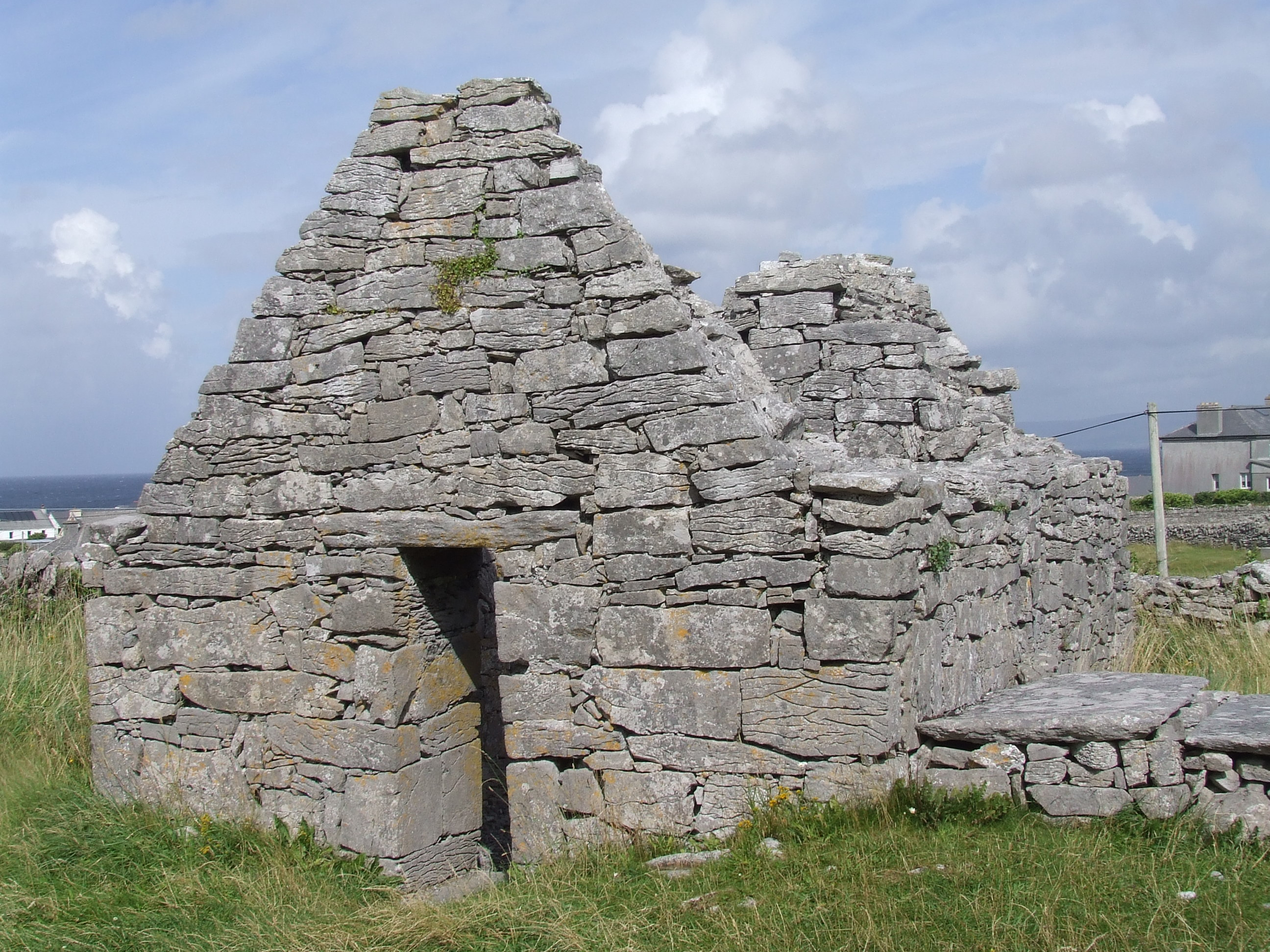
Saint Gobnait's church

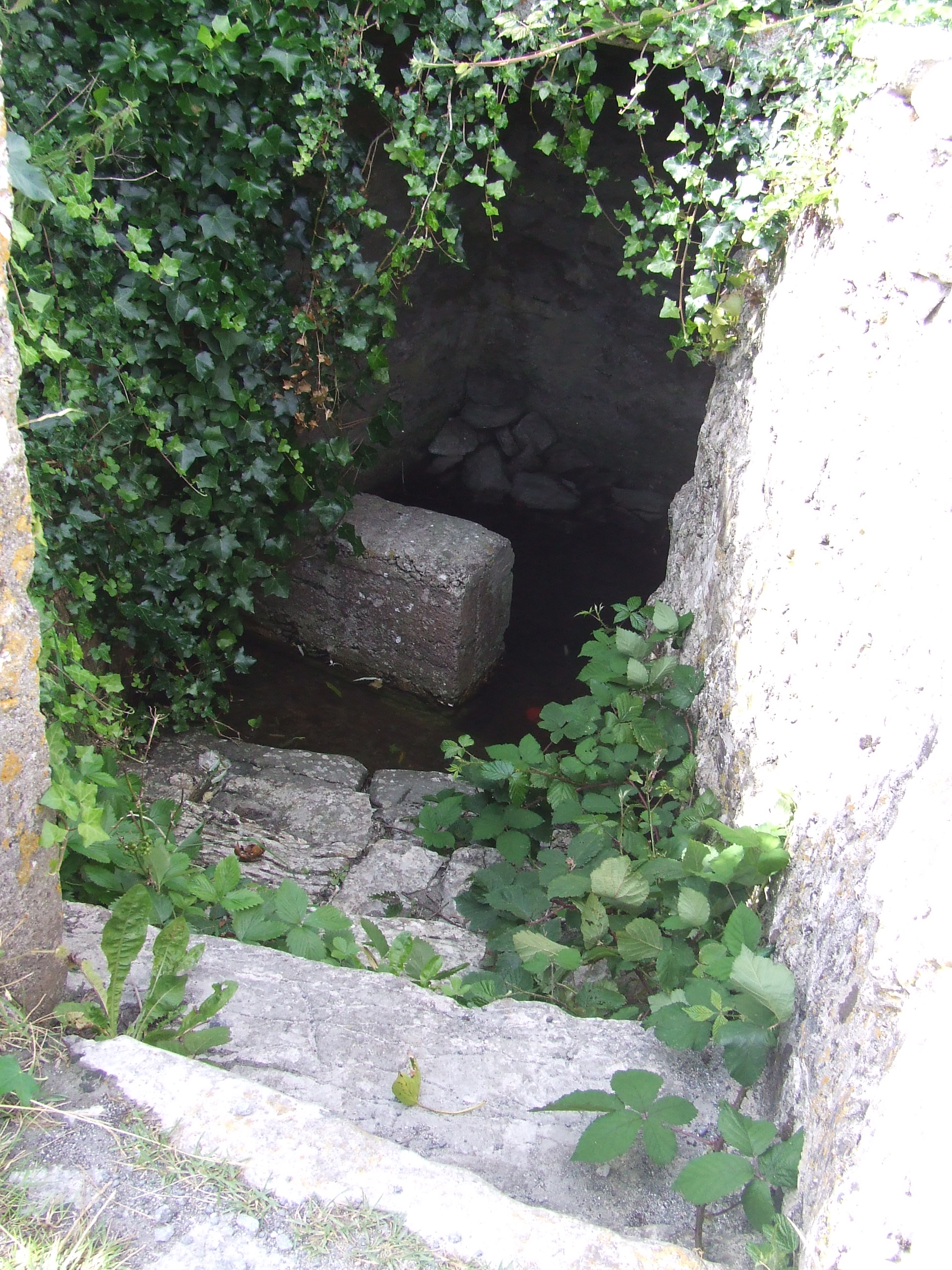
Saint Fiachra's holy well near Cill Gobnait.

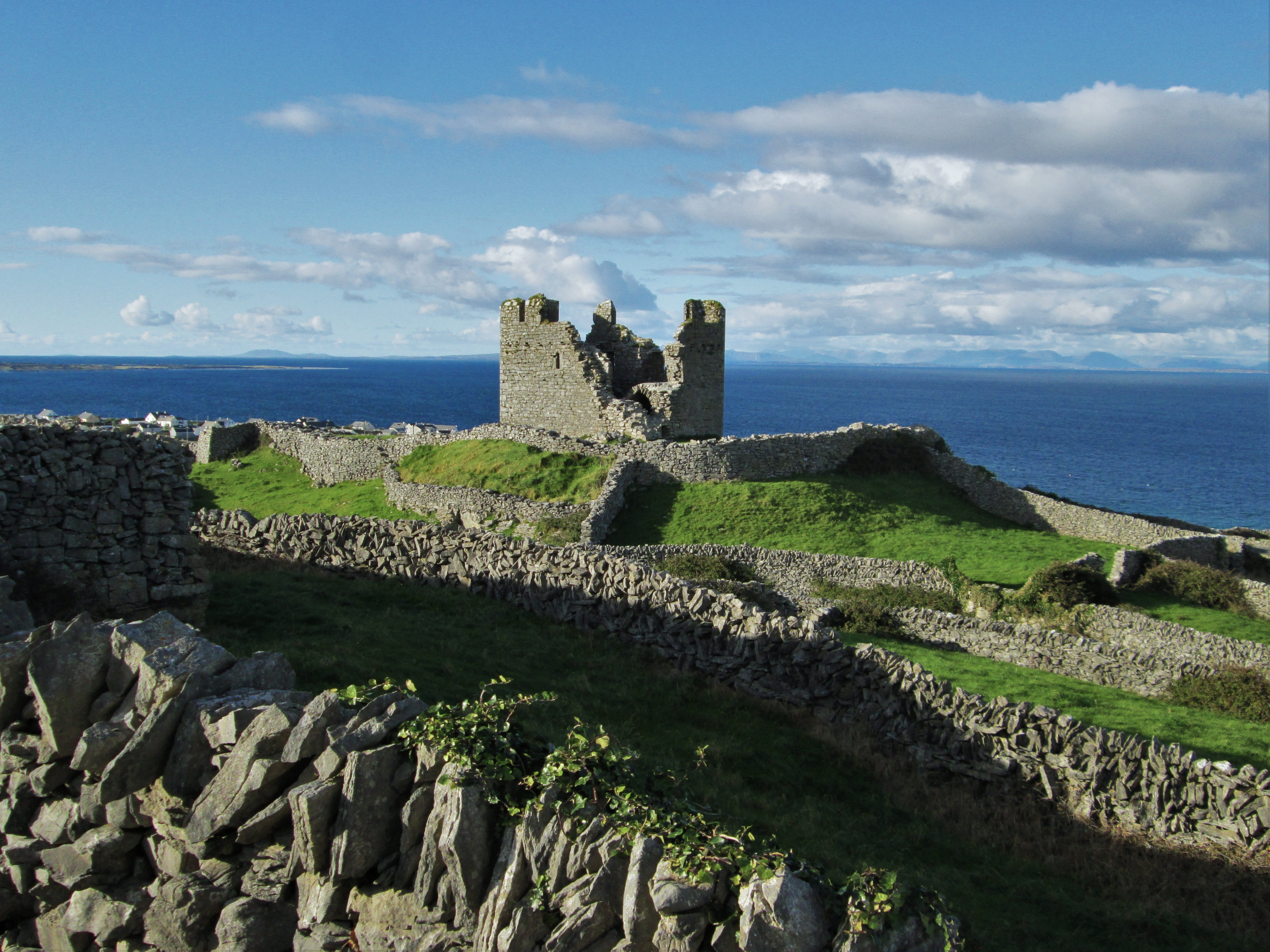
O'Brien's Castle, built in the 14th century

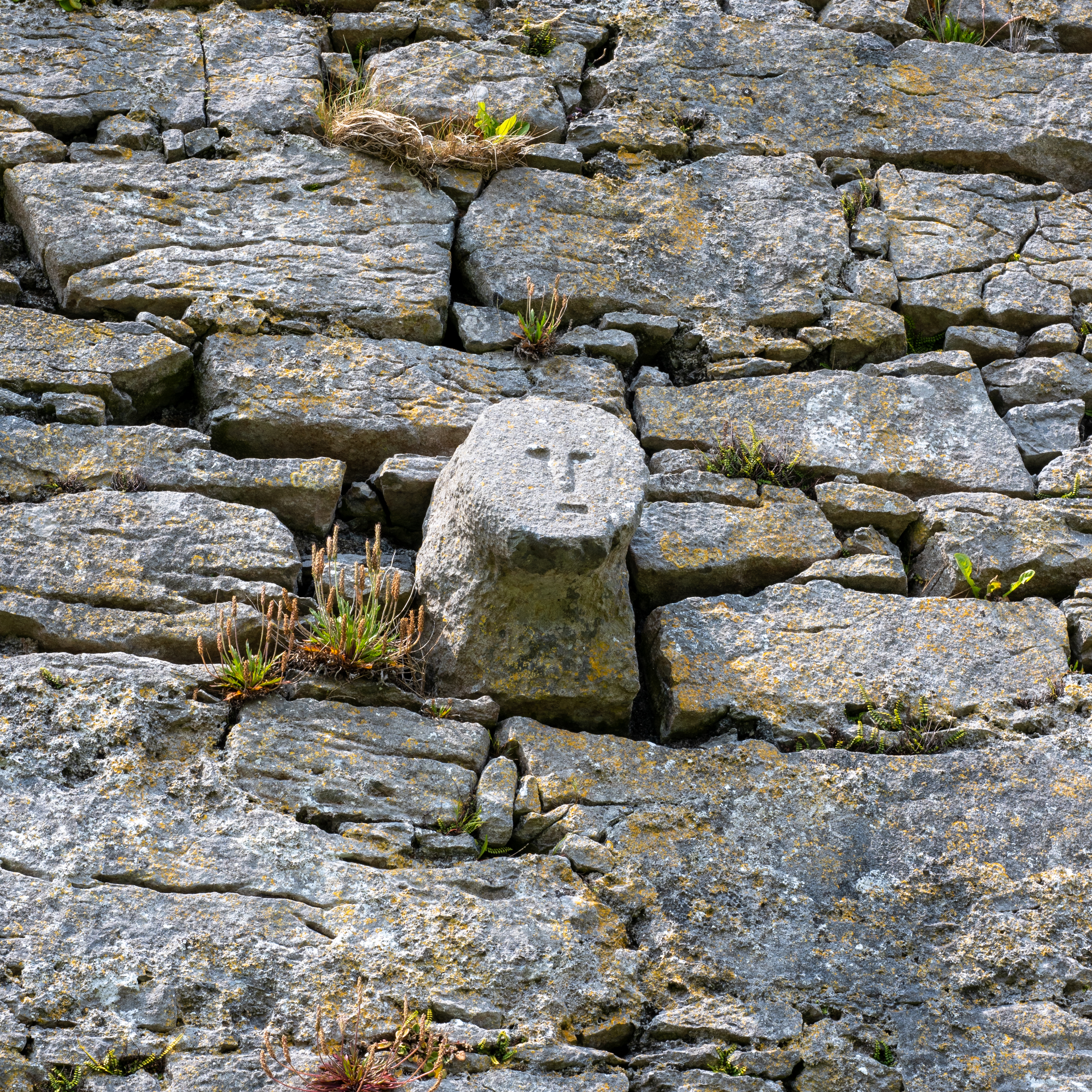
Corbel head on the exterior of O'Briens Castle

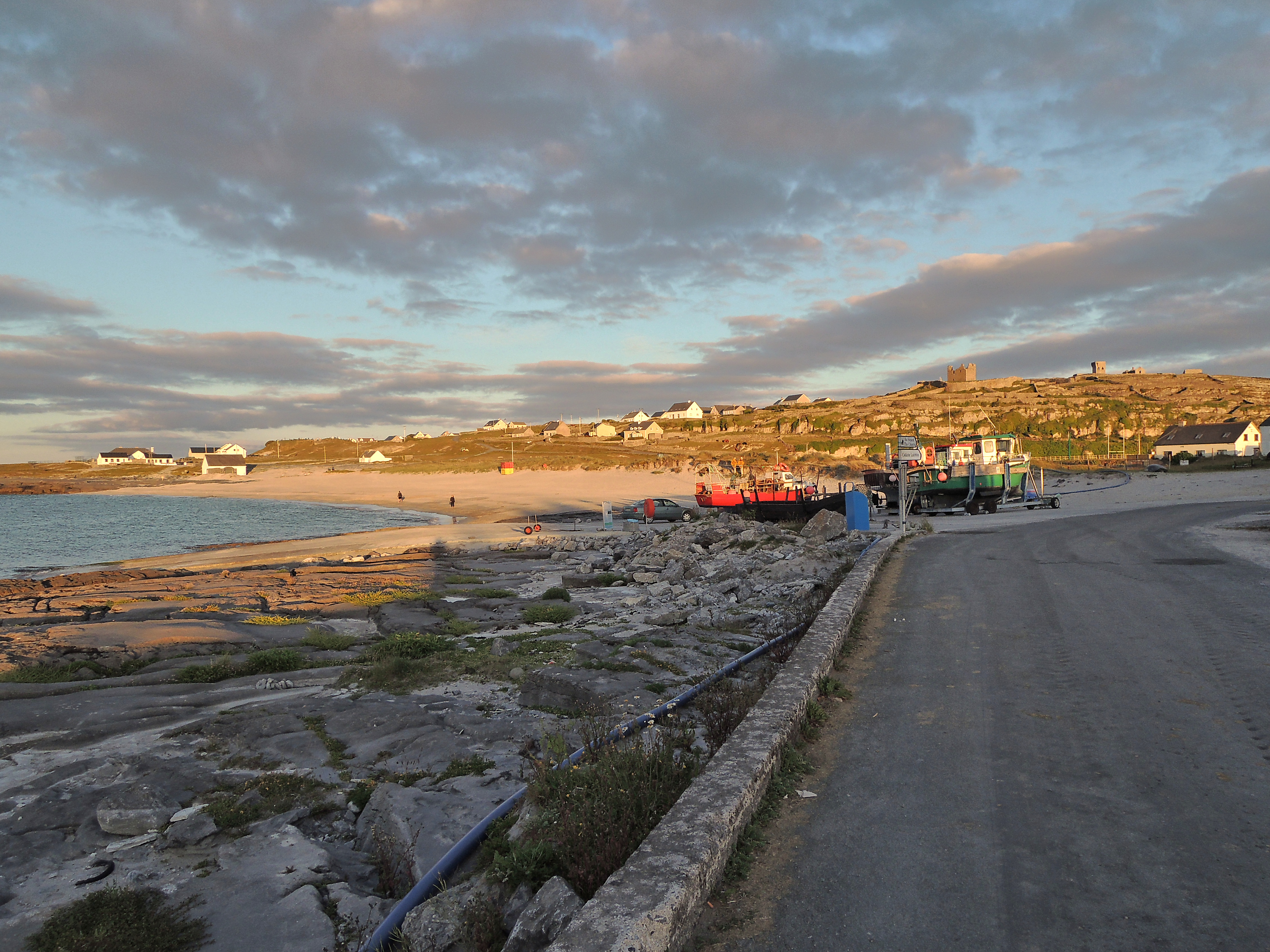
View walking from pier towards beach / O'Brien's Castle

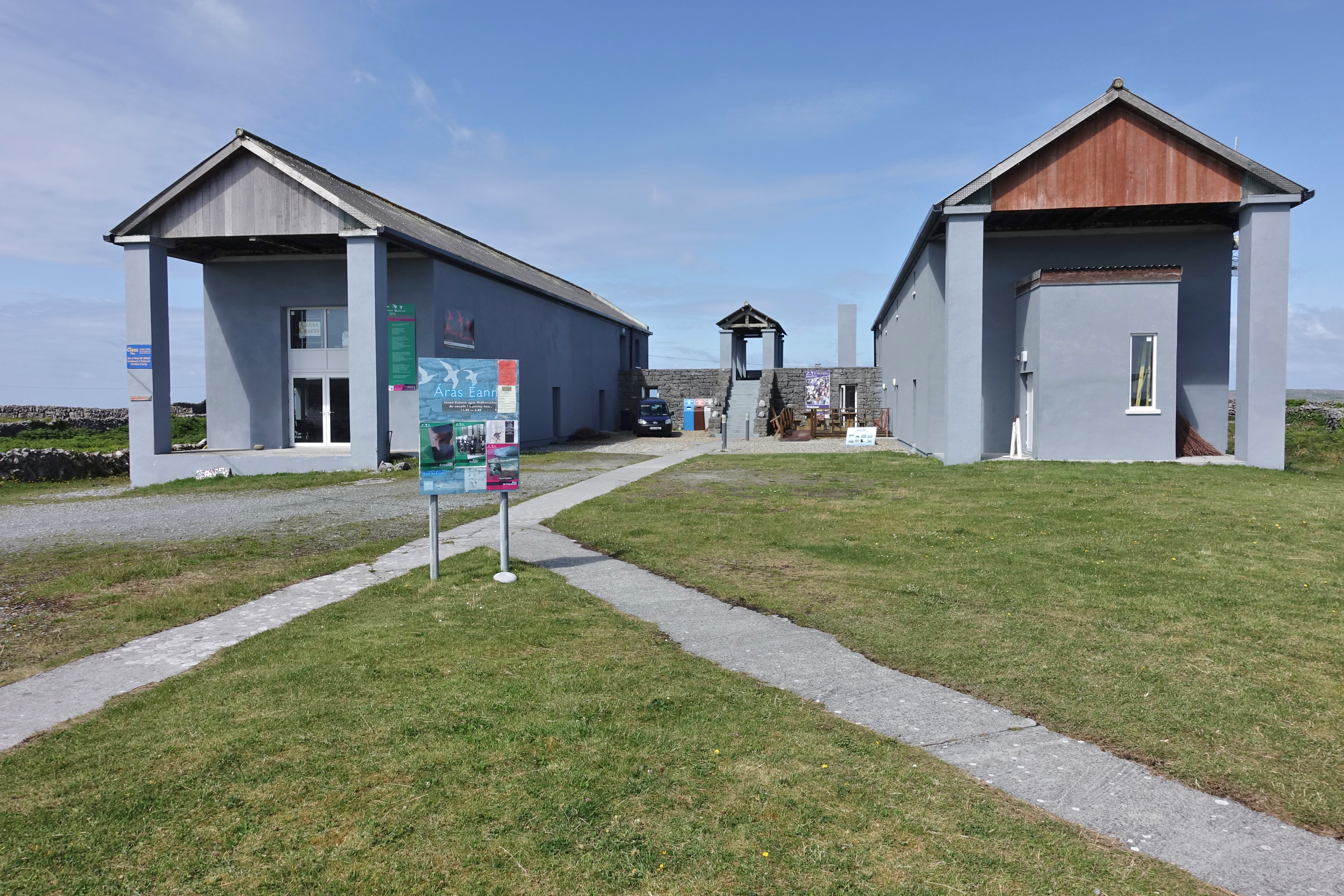
Áras Éanna, arts and cultural center

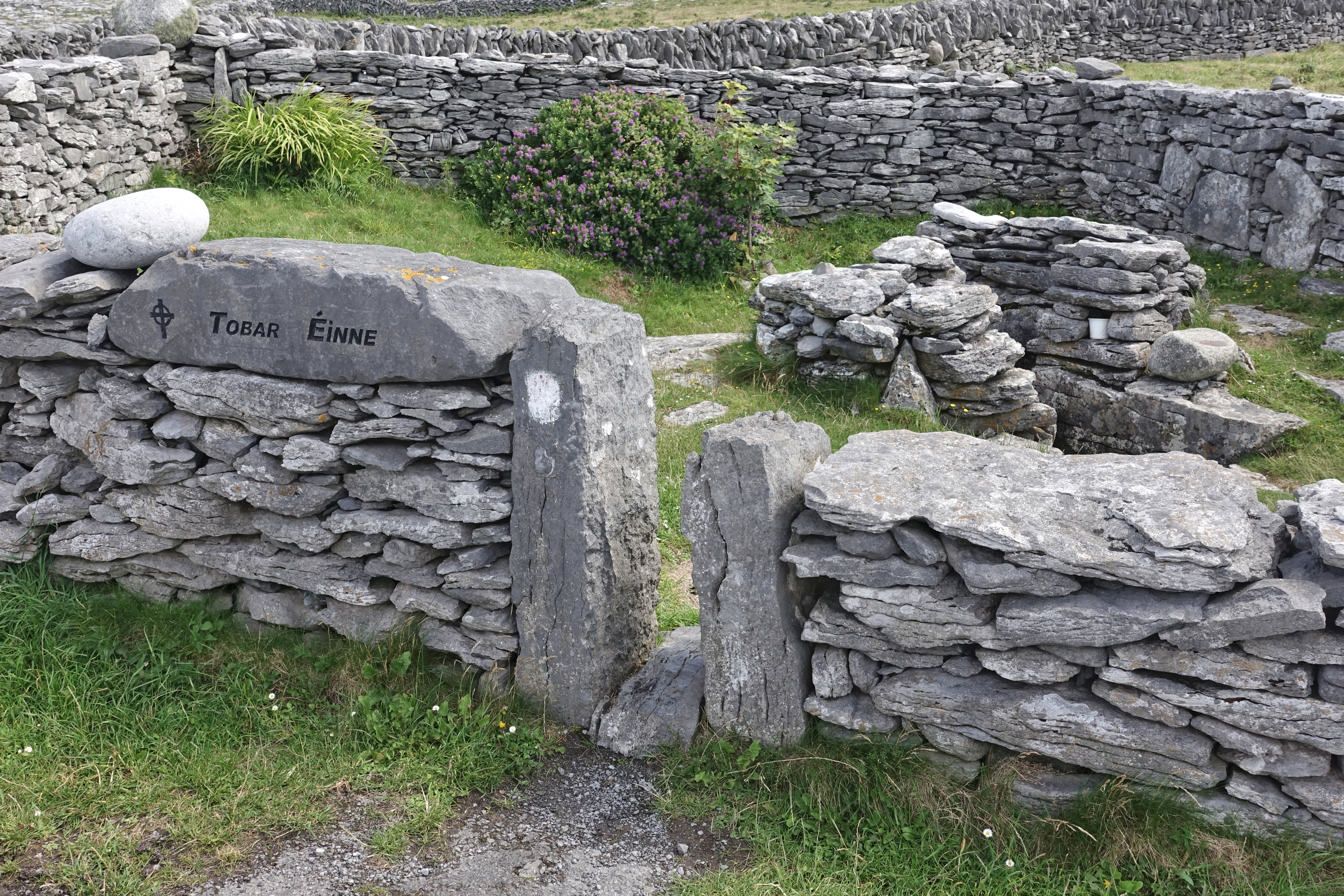
Tobar Éinne (Tobar Éanna), Saint Enda's holy well on Inis Oirr

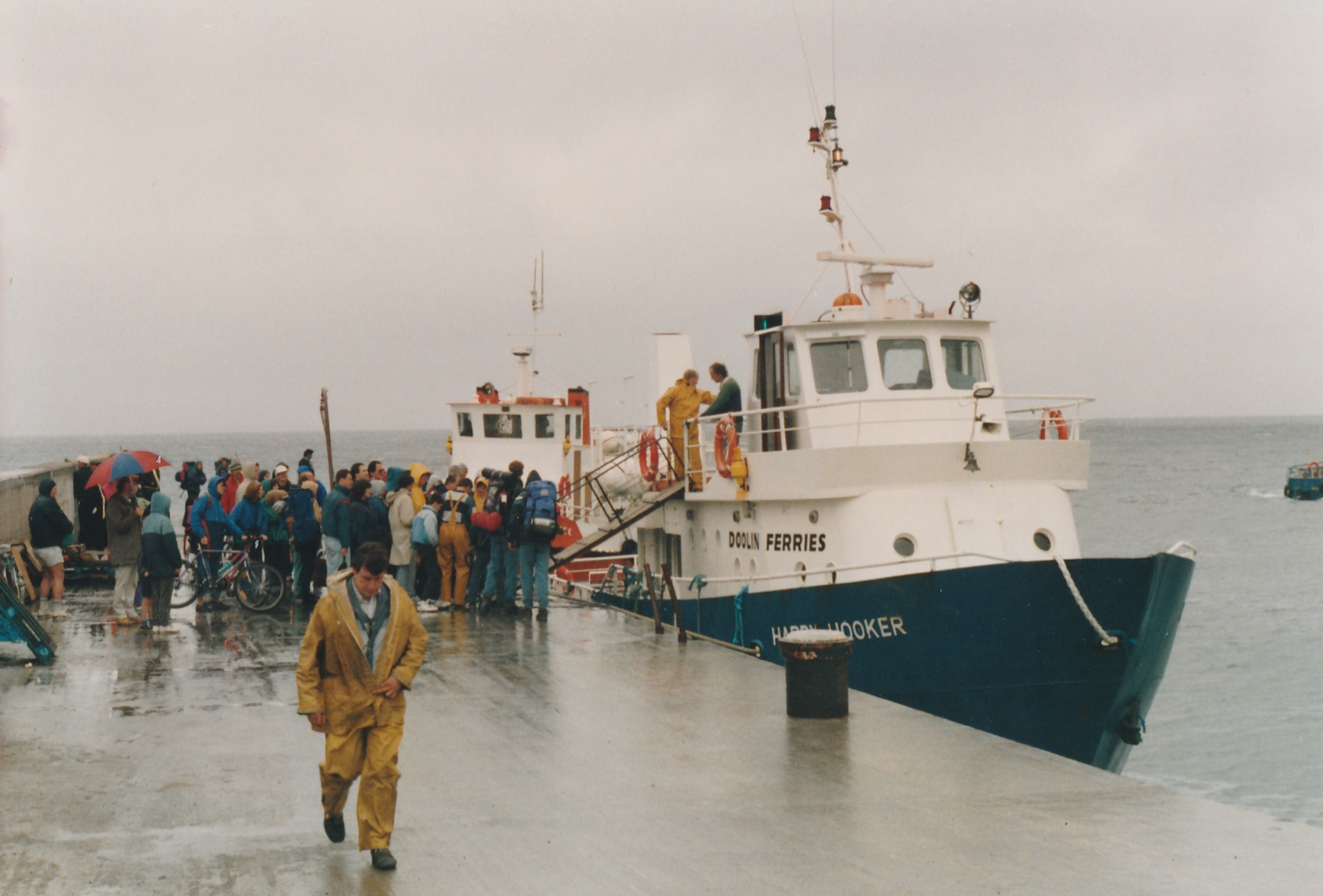
The pier in 1991
