= O'Brien's Castle (Inisheer) =

O'Briens Castle
- Caisleán Uí Bhriain · Dún Formna (Irish)
- Furmina Castle, The Great Fort
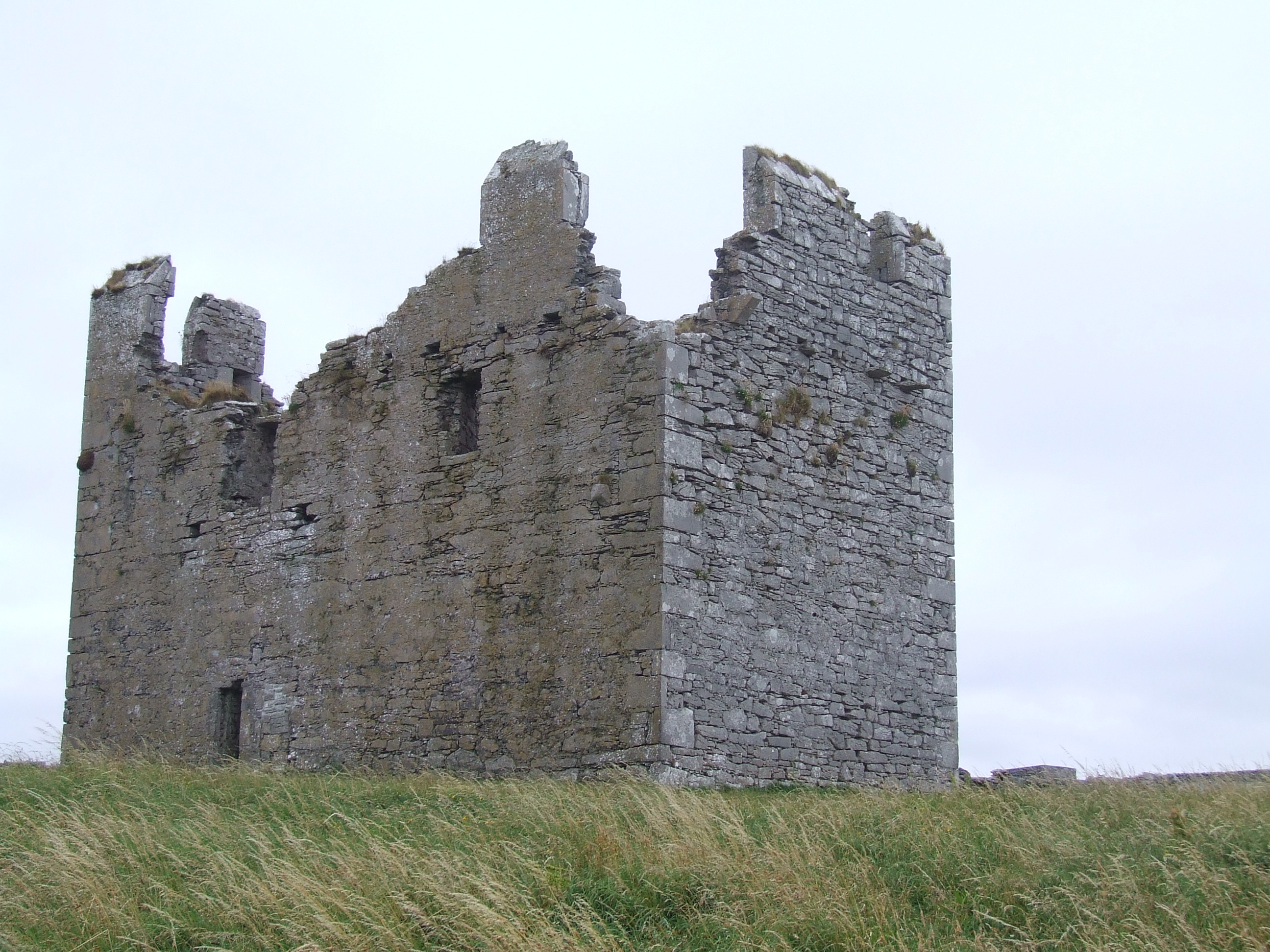

- Location within Ireland
- 53.061999°N 9.519162°W
- Type: tower house within ringfort
- Location: Inisheer, County Galway, Ireland

History
- Built: c. 1400

Site notes
- Owner: State

National monument of Ireland
- Official name: Furmina Castle
- Reference no.: 41.07

O'Brien's Castle, also called Furmina Castle, is an early 15th century tower house and National Monument located on Inisheer, Ireland.

== Location ==
O'Brien's Castle is located at one of the island's highest points, in the north of Inisheer.

== History ==
A ringfort once stood on the site, named Dún Formna ("hillfort of the ridge/shoulder", referring to the "shoulder" of land) and dated to between the 5th century BC and 1st century AD.

The castle was built by the Clann Teige, a branch of the powerful O'Brien (Uí Briain) family, in the early 15th century around 1400. It was taken by the Ó Flaithbheartaigh (O'Flahertys) around 1582. It was captured and slighted by Oliver Cromwell's army in 1652, during the Cromwellian conquest of Ireland.

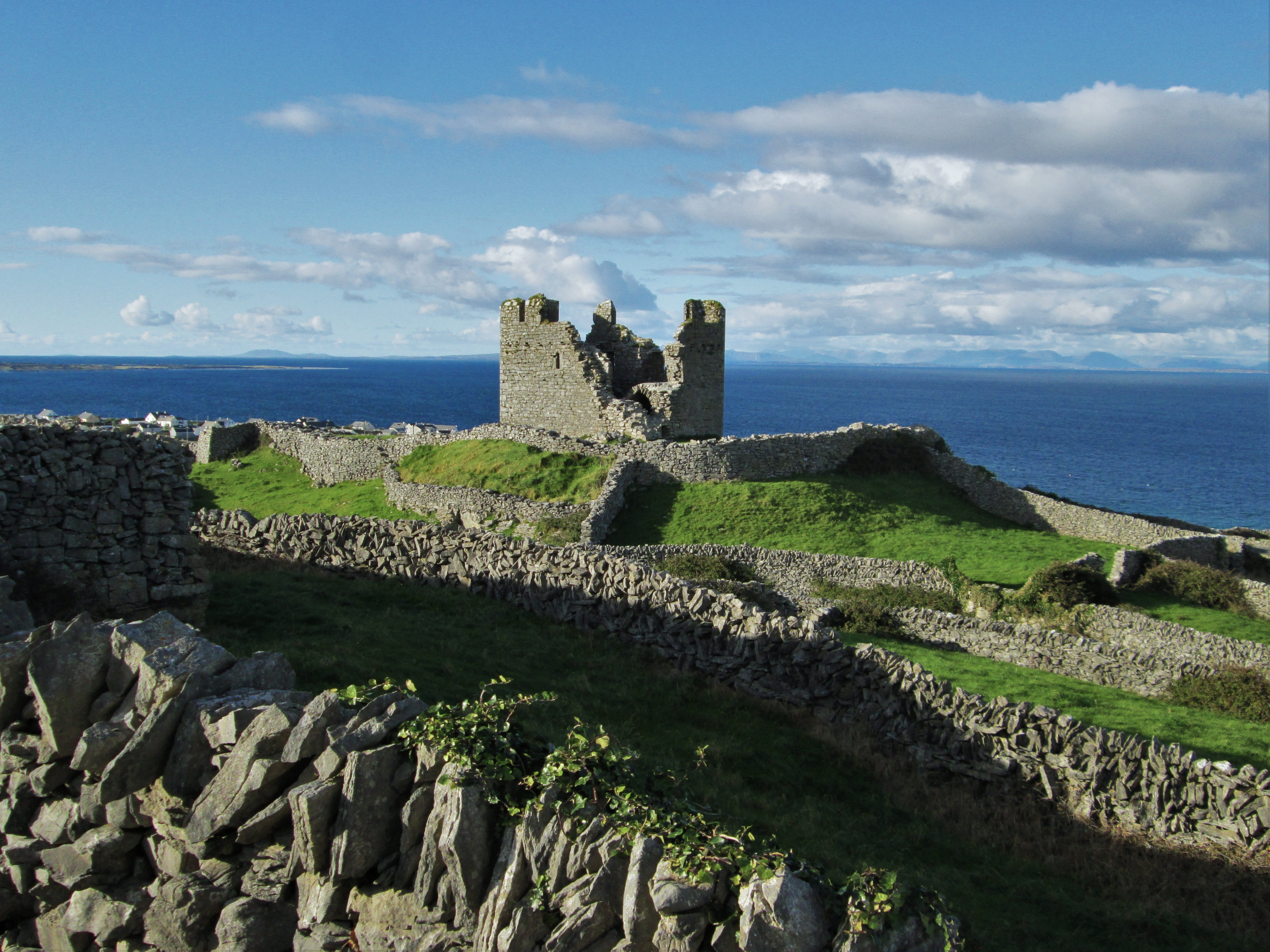
The castle in the Inisheer landscape

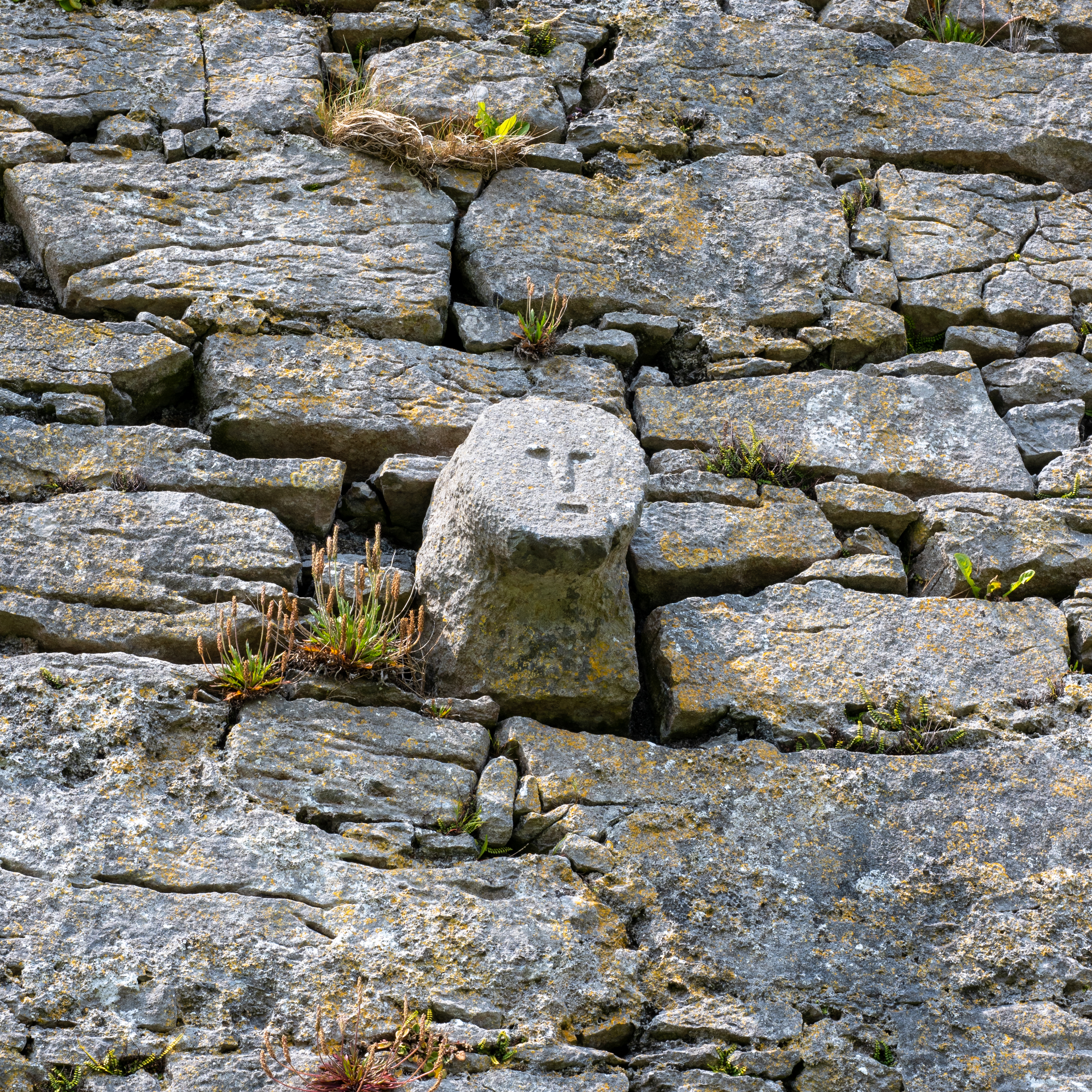
Corbel head on O'Brien's Castle

== Building ==
The castle is a rectangular donjon (keep). The original doorway was into the first floor, accessed by an external wooden stairs.

The entire first floor was a great hall, with mural stairs up to the parapet. The ground floor was a basement or storage area with three vaulted chambers. The corbel of a bartizan is visible with a human face carved into it.
