= List of national monuments in County Mayo =

The Irish state has officially approved the following list of national monuments in County Mayo. In the Republic of Ireland, a structure or site may be deemed to be a "national monument", and therefore worthy of state protection, if it is of national importance. If the land adjoining the monument is essential to protect it, this land may also be protected.

== National Monuments ==
NM#	Monument name	Description	Image	Townland	Location
103	Moyne Abbey	Friary (Franciscan)		Abbeylands	54°12′08″N 9°10′37″W
96	Aghagower Round Tower	Round Tower & Church		Aghagower	53°45′51″N 9°27′54″W
243	Aghalard Castle	Castle		Aghalahard	53°33′22″N 9°17′56″W
403	Balla Round Tower	Round Tower		Balla	53°48′18″N 9°07′53″W
145	Ballina Portal Tomb (Dolmen of the Four Maols)	Portal Tomb		Ballina	54°06′25″N 9°09′57″W
501	Ballintubber Abbey	Priory (Augustinian)		Ballintubber	53°45′23″N 9°16′58″W
325	Ballylahan Castle	Castle		Ballylahan	53°56′05″N 9°06′18″W
251	Ballymacgibbon Cairn	Cairn		Ballymacgibbon North	53°32′32″N 9°14′14″W
561	Barnacahoge Cashel	Cashel		Barnacahoge	53°54′20″N 8°51′23″W
530	Boheh Stone	Rock Art		Boheh	53°44′51″N 9°33′14″W
415	Breastagh Ogham Stone	Ogham Stone		Breastagh	54°14′47″N 9°15′12″W
244	Caherduff Castle	Castle		Caherduff	53°33′08″N 9°14′41″W
631	Carbad More	Ringfort		Carbad More	54°14′10″N 9°15′27″W
246	Eochy's Cairn	Cairn		Carn (Ballinchalla)	53°35′19″N 9°15′48″W
458	Carrickkildavnet Castle	Castle		Carrickkildavnet	53°52′51″N 9°56′46″W
293	Carrowcastle Wedge Tomb	Wedge Tomb		Carrowcastle	54°05′41″N 9°04′45″W
293	Carrowcrom Wedge Tomb	Megalithic Tomb		Carrowcrom	54°05′24″N 9°02′52″W
196	Murrisk Abbey	Friary (Augustinian)		Murrisk	53°46′55″N 9°38′22″W
235	Burrishoole Abbey	Friary (Dominican)		Newport	53°53′56″N 9°34′21″W
483	Cashel Cairn	Cairn / court tomb		Cashel (Kilcummin)	54°15′20″N 9°13′36″W
222A	Burriscarra Abbey	Friary (Carmelite) & Church		Castlecarra	53°43′52″N 9°14′45″W
222B	Castle Carra	Castle		Castlecarra	53°43′17″N 9°15′19″W
432	Cong Abbey	Priory (Augustinian)		Cong	53°32′25″N 9°17′12″W
308	Templenagalliaghdoo	Church		Errew (Tirawley)	54°03′16″N 9°15′49″W
307	Errew Abbey	Priory (Augustinian)		Errew (Tirawley)	54°03′11″N 9°15′48″W
99A	St. Dairbhile's Church	Church		Fallmore	54°05′46″N 10°06′25″W
146	Glebe Stone Circles	Stone Circles		Glebe (Cong), Nymphstown, Tonaleeaun	53°32′52″N 9°15′54″W
198	Granuaile's Castle	Castle		Glen (Clare Island)	53°47′59″N 9°57′05″W
99	Inishglora	Early Medieval Ecclesiastical Site		Inishglora Island	54°12′31″N 10°07′13″W
379	Inishkea North Island	Early Medieval Ecclesiastical Sites		Inishkea Islands	54°08′00″N 10°11′16″W
102	Inishmaine Abbey	Priory (Augustinian)		Inishmaine	53°35′53″N 9°18′05″W
619	Kilcashel Stone Fort	Cashel		Kilcashel	53°53′00″N 8°40′49″W
402	Kildermot Church (Killdermot Abbey)	Church		Kildermot	54°03′30″N 9°05′25″W
423	Kildun Standing Stones	Standing Stones		Kildun	53°59′20″N 9°50′24″W
95A	Kinlough Castle	Castle and church		Kinlough	53°29′55″N 9°06′59″W
296	Lankill Standing Stone	Standing Stone		Lankill	53°45′12″N 9°30′06″W
98	Meelick Round Tower	Round Tower		Meelick	53°55′17″N 9°01′12″W
359	The Gods of the Neale Monument	Monument		Neale Park	53°34′26″N 9°13′28″W
413	Kelly's Cave	Cave		Nymphsfield	53°32′40″N 9°16′45″W
664	Bunnadober Mill	Mill Complex		Rahard (Ballinrobe)	53°36′27″N 9°16′04″W
269	Rathfran Friary	Friary (Dominican)		Rathfran	54°14′17″N 9°14′40″W
389	Rathfran Stone Circle	Stone circle, mound, ringfort, souterrain & enclosure		Rathfran	54°14′38″N 9°14′24″W
633	Rathfranpark Wedge Tomb	Wedge Tomb		Rathfranpark	54°14′31″N 9°15′09″W
454	Rockfleet Castle	Castle		Newport	53°53′46″N 9°37′37″W
386	Rosdoagh Court Tomb	court tomb		Rosdoagh	54°16′48″N 9°48′05″W
104	Rosserk Abbey	Friary (Franciscan)		Rosserk	54°10′17″N 9°08′36″W
95	Shrule Abbey	Church		Shrule	53°31′08″N 9°05′27″W
172	Strade Abbey	Friary (Dominican)		Strade	53°55′17″N 9°07′44″W
97	Clare Island Abbey	Church (Cistercian)		Lecarrow (Clare Island)	53°47′36″N 9°59′21″W
105	Killala Round Tower	Round Tower		Killala	54°12′47″N 9°13′15″W
100	Turlough Church	Church & Round Tower		Turlough	53°53′19″N 9°12′30″W

== Sources ==
- National Monuments in County Mayo
