= List of monastic houses in County Mayo =

The smaller establishments such as monastic cells and notable monastic granges (particularly those with resident monks) and camerae of the military orders of monks (Knights Templars and Knights Hospitallers) are included. The numerous monastic hospitals per se are not included here unless at some time the foundation had, or was purported to have, the status or function of an abbey, priory, or preceptory/commandery.

== Layout ==
Communities/provenance: shows the status and communities existing at each establishment, together with such dates as have been established as well as the fate of the establishment after dissolution, and the current status of the site.

Formal name or dedication: shows the formal name of the establishment or the person in whose name the church is dedicated, where known.

Alternative names: some of the establishments have had alternative names over the course of time. In order to assist in text-searching such alternatives in name or spelling have been provided.

== Abbreviations and key ==
The sites listed are ruins or fragmentary remains unless indicated thus:
| * | current monastic function |
| + | current non-monastic ecclesiastic function |
| ^ | current non-ecclesiastic function |
| = | remains incorporated into later structure |
| # | no identifiable trace of the monastic foundation remains |
| ~ | exact site of monastic foundation unknown |
| ø | possibly no such monastic foundation at location |
| ¤ | no such monastic foundation |
| ≈ | identification ambiguous or confused |

Locations with names in italics indicate probable duplication (misidentification with another location) or non-existent foundations (either erroneous reference or proposed foundation never implemented).

Trusteeship denoted as follows:
| NIEA | Scheduled Monument (NI) |
| NM | National Monument (ROI) |
| C.I. | Church of Ireland |
| R.C. | Roman Catholic Church |

| Foundation | Image | Communities & provenance | Formal name or dedication & alternative names | References & location |
|---|---|---|---|---|
| Aghagower Abbey | | early monastic site, Patrician monks founded in the 5th century by St Patrick; Augustinian Canons Regular | Aughagower; Achad-fobuir; Achad-fabhair | 53°45′51″N 9°27′53″W |
| Aghamore Monastery | | early monastic site, founded by St Patrick for Loam | Achad-mor; Aghavower | 53°49′54″N 8°49′21″W |
| Airne Monastery | | early monastic site, probably founded in the 5th century, in the time of St Patrick | Ciaraige Airne | poss church site Lough Mannin, parish of Aghamore |
| Annagh 'Abbey', Kilmaine | | Augustinian nuns — Arroasian — from Cong cell, dependent on Kilcreevanty; founded before 1440; dissolved before 1543? - Augustinian Friars? (Note: Mervyn Archdall, Monasticon Hibernicum, 1786 p.493); Franciscan Friars? possibly occupied site after suppression of the nunnery | Annies; Any; Enach | 53°41′59″N 9°12′41″W |
| Annagh, Costello ^{≈} | | Augustinian Canons Regular supposed cell dependent on Cong; possible confusion with Annagh, Kilmaine | | |
| Ardnaree Friary, Ballina | | Augustinian Friars founded before 1400 by the O'Dowda family; partial collapse and rebuilding, possibly refounded by Tagd O'Dowda; dissolution unknown, friars thought to have retained until 1577–82, remaining in the vicinity up to the late 18th century | Ardnary; Arnacensis | 54°06′44″N 9°09′06″W |
| Balla Monastery | | early monastic site, founded before 637 by St Mochua (Cronan); burned 780; coarbs into the 13th century | Balna | 53°48′19″N 9°07′53″W |
| Ballentully Monastery ^{~} | | unknown order and foundation; given as Franciscan Friars — evidence lacking Ballintully possibly Turlough (q.v.) possibly Ballintober (q.v.) | | |
| Ballina Monastery ^{≈} | | unknown order and foundation — (Augustinian Canons Regular if Ardnaree) | probably Ardnaree (q.v.) | |
| Ballinasmale Friary | | Carmelite Friars founded 1288-9 by the Prendergast family; dissolved 1605?; granted to Sir John King c. 1605–06; passed to Francis Barkly 1585; convent restored by c. 1737; dissolved 1870 | St Mary ____________________; Ballinasmall; Ballinsmaula; Baile-an-smallie; Vallis Mallis? | 53°44′16″N 8°58′07″W |
| Ballinrobe Priory | | Augustinian Friars founded c. 1312? probably by a de Burgo, possibly Elizabeth de Clare (also suggestedly Maurice Fitzgerald) dissolved c. 1584?; Augustinian Friars restored after 1641 rebellion | Baile-an-rodhba; Robe | 53°37′35″N 9°13′15″W |
| Ballinrobe St John the Baptist | | Knights Hospitaller member of the Priory of the Hospital of St John of Jerusalem | | |
| Ballintubber Abbey ^{+} | | early monastic site, founded in the 5th century, in the time of St Patrick - Augustinian Canons Regular founded 1216 by Cathal (Crobderg) O'Conor, King of Connacht; burned 1265; surrendered (nominally) to Henry VIII by Abbot Walter Mac Evilly de Stanton 1542; dissolved c. 1585; part granted to Sir John King 1605; Augustinian Friars apparently refounded c. 1635-1653; restored 1966; (NM) | The Holy Trinity ____________________; Ballintober; Baile-an-tobair; Tobar-patraic; Ville Fontis Patricii; de Fonte Patricii | 53°45′24″N 9°16′58″W |
| Ballyhaunis Friary *^{=} | | Augustinian Friars founded c. 1430 supposedly by the Angulos (the Nangle-Mac Costello family), traditionally by a descendant of Jordan Dubh Mac Costello; granted to the Earl of Clanricarde 1570; friars permitted to remain; dissolved c. 1586?, land surrendered by the Mac Costello to Theobald Dillon; dissolved c. 1608?; Augustinian Friars restored after the Irish Rebellion 1641; burned 1650; restored 1938; extant | The Blessed Virgin Mary; The Immaculate Conception ____________________ 'The Abbey' ; Bellafamensis; Hanrahannassa | 53°45′46″N 8°45′44″W |
| Ballyhean Monastery | | early monastic site, supposedly founded in the 5th century by St Patrick | Bel-athat-hein; Ballyheane | 53°47′43″N 9°18′50″W |
| Burriscarra Abbey | | early monastic site Carmelite Friars founded 1298, probably by Adam, son of Philip de Staunton; dissolved c. 1377, abandoned for over 30 years; Augustinian Friars founded 1413, granted at the instance of the descendants of the founder, consent by the Maurice, Archbishop of Tuam, with papal approval 1413; | Buirghes-ceinn-trachta; Borriscara; Burgakere; Burgoflore | 53°43′51″N 9°14′44″W |
| Burriscarra Friary ^{≈} | | Franciscan Friars, Third Order Regular (Note: Analecta Hibernica (Irish Manuscript Commission) No.6, November 1914, i, p.104) | Buires Ceara; Cera; Leighcarrow-clondore (Clondaver) | |
| Burrishoole Friary | | Dominican Friars founded c. 1469 by Richard de Burgo of Turlough, Lord Mac William Oughter, who died here, papal consent 1486; dissolved 1580; granted to Nicholas Weston and assigned to Theobald Viscount Costillogalen; restored; dissolved c. 1606; granted to John King of Dublin 1606 | St Mary ____________________ 'Burrishoole Abbey' ; Barasoule; Borisol; Buresula | 53°53′56″N 9°34′20″W |
| Carheen Friary | | suggested Dominican Friars before moving to Urlaur | | |
| Carn Abbey | | unknown order, foundation and period, "Abbey in ruins" (Note: Ordnance Survey) | | 53°53′58″N 9°09′44″W |
| Cell Tog Monastery | | early monastic site, founded in the 5th century by Cainnech, bishop and monk of St Patrick | Cellola Tog | 53°42′34″N 9°16′48″W (approx) |
| Church Island Monastery, Lough Carra | | early monastic site, founded by St Finan (Note: Archdall confuses with Rathenepscop (Rathaspick), County Donegal) | Rathen | 53°43′23″N 9°16′24″W |
| Clare Island Abbey | | Cistercian monks founded by 1224; convent driven off by pirates became cell of Abbeyknockmoy after 1224 dissolved during the reign of Queen Elizabeth?; probably place of refuge for Carmelite Friars with other orders in the late 16th and 17th century | Saint Brigid's Abbey; The Blessed Virgin Mary (from 1254) ____________________ 'the Abbey' ; 'Friary' (1605); Mainister-ni-clarch; Cliara; Cleara; Clara; Insula Maris; Oilen-ui-maile | 53°47′35″N 9°59′22″W |
| Cong Abbey | | early monastic site, founded 624 by Domnal, son of Aedh; diocesan cathedral 1111 (diocese not recognised by the synod of Kells) burnt 1114; Augustinian Canons Regular refounded c. 1134? by Turlough O'Conor; burnt 1137; new monastery built by Rory, Turlough's son; Augustinian Canons Regular — Arroasian adopted probably soon after 1140; dissolved before 1568?; granted to William Collier 1571; granted to the town of Athenry 1597; possibly Augustinian Friars (if Crenquerensis (see immediately below)); (NM) | Cunga-Feichin; Conga | 53°32′26″N 9°17′14″W |
| Crenquerensis Friary | | Augustinian Friars possibly located in County Galway, probably Cong, former house of Augustinian Canons (see immediately above) | Cong? | |
| Cross Priory | | Augustinian Canons Regular 153,168 founded as a daughter house of Ballintuber, possibly in connection with the early foundation at Inishglora whose community possibly moved to the mainland in the 10th century, confirmed 1400, dissolved c. 1584 | St Brendan, Blessed Virgin Mary, Holy Cross ____________________; Cross in Mullet; Cross-rathig; Crossrayn | |
| Crossmolina Priory | | possible early monastic site in the 10th century; Augustinian Canons Regular founded after c. 1270; dependent on Ballybeg; non-conventual by 1438; given as conventual cell 1444 dissolved c. 1584? | The Abbey Church of the Blessed Virgin Mary ____________________; Mainishir Taobh Thiar do Shruth; Crossmalyne; Cros-Maoiliona; Cros-mail-fhina; Cresmuylyana; Crossmolina Abbey | 54°06′26″N 9°19′06″W |
| Davaghkeiran Monastery | | early monastic site, 'Abbey' | Dabach-cieran; Dabaghkieran | 54°02′12″N 9°17′31″W |
| Domnach-mor Monastery | | early monastic site, founded in the 5th century by St Patrick | | |
| Duvillaun Monastery | | early monastic site, Anchorites | | 54°04′31″N 10°10′09″W |
| Emlagh Monastery ^{≈} | | early monastic site | Imleach-each; possibly Emlagh, County Roscommon | |
| Errew Abbey | | early monastic site Augustinian Canons Regular priory cell dependent on Crossmolina? founded c. 1413? by the Barret family dissolved c. 1585? Augustinian Friars mentioned 1463; monastery/friary 1585-6; friary 1605 | St Tigernan ____________________; Aireach-lochacon; Aired-locha-con; Erew; Loch Conn; Oired; Oreab; Temple-na-galliach-dhub; Erevensis in Connacht? | 54°03′11″N 9°15′48″W |
| Errew Friary ^{ø} | | purported Franciscan Friars, Third Order Regular — evidence lacking | | |
| Errew Nunnery | | nuns order, status, foundation and dissolution unknown | | |
| Fochlud Monastery | | early monastic site, nuns, founded in the 5th century by St Patrick; | Fochloth | 54°11′54″N 9°17′26″W (approx) |
| High Island Monastery | | early monastic site, founded in the 7th century; (NM) | Ard Oilean | |
| Inishglora Monastery | | early monastic site, nuns, founded before 577-83 by St Brendan; probably transferred in the 10th century to Cross, supra, due to raids by the Norsemen | St Brendan ____________________; Inis Gulair Brenaind | 54°12′31″N 10°07′10″W |
| Inishkea North | | early monastic site, founded in the 6th century by St Colmcille? | Inis-ce | 54°07′46″N 10°11′10″W |
| Inishmaine Abbey | | early monastic site, founded in the 7th century by St Corbmac; possibly Benedictine nuns (unless not united with Kilcreevanty until after its adoption of Augustinian rule); Augustinian nuns — Arroasian (Note: Louis Augustin Alemand, Monasticum Hibernicum, translated and edited by John Stevens, 1722, p.156 lists as Benedictine and located in County Roscommon) — possibly from Annaghdown; [?re-]founded after 1223 (after 1227?); dependent on Kilcreevanty dissolved c. 1587?; (NM) | Inis-medhon; Inis-meadhoin; Inis-meadhon; Inchmean | 53°35′53″N 9°18′05″W |
| Inishrobe Monastery | | early monastic site, founded in the 6th century by St Colmcille? | Inis-rodba | 53°38′52″N 9°17′08″W (approx) |
| Inishturk Monastery ^{#} | | early monastic site, supposedly founded in the 7th century by St Colman; Friars possible place of refuge | Inis-torc; Inis-tuirc | 53°41′50″N 10°05′47″W |
| Kilfinain Monastery | | early monastic site, founded by St Finan, Abbot of Rathen; church in the monastery of Rathen | | Carra, north of R. Robe |
| Kilgharvan Monastery | | early monastic site, founded in the 7th century by St Fechin of Fore | Cell-garbhain; Kilnegarvan | 54°05′24″N 9°01′41″W |
| Kilkeny Friary ^{≈~} | | purported Friars, possibly Franciscan Friars, name possibly an alias for another house | Kylkeny; Kilveny | |
| Killala Monastery ^{+} | | Patrician monks founded in the 5th century, purportedly by St Patrick; diocesan cathedral 1111 to present | Aladh; Cell-aladh | 54°12′47″N 9°13′16″W |
| Killedan Friary ^{≈} | | Franciscan Friars Minor, Conventual or Franciscan Friars, Third Order Regular; existing into the 19th century if Mons Pietatis | Mons Pietatis? | 53°52′48″N 9°00′06″W |
| Killeen Cell,^{≈} Attymas | | Premonstratensian Canons (Note: Hubert Thomas Knox, History of County Mayo, p.97, f. — no other record of such an establishment) | possibly Killeentrynode | |
| Killeenatrava Nunnery | | Augustinian nuns — Arroasian — apparently from Cong; possibly initially a cell of Cong, founded after 1223; dependent on Kilcreevanty after 1223-4; dissolved during the reign of Queen Elizabeth | Kill-ecrau; Kill-eenacrava; Cillin-na-mbuiden | 53°37′42″N 9°14′11″W |
| Killeenbrenan Friary | | Franciscan Friars, Third Order Regular — possibly brethren and sisters; founded before 1426, possibly by a de Burgo; (Note: Hubert Thomas Knox, History of County Mayo, p.96) dissolved 1574; granted to Thomas Lewis 5 April 1574; granted to the burgesses and commonalty of Athenry and/or the burgesses and commonalty of Galway, 1578 | Killina Bonaina; Kilbrenan | 53°32′20″N 8°53′31″W |
| Killeentrynode Cell | | Premonstratensian Canons founded 1260; daughter of Loughkea; probably non-conventual; dubiously suggested Premonstratensian nuns; dissolved before 1594 | The Holy Trinity ____________________; Killetrynode; Killyn Abbey; Killeen; Teampull na gCailmat; Templenagalliaghdoo; Teampall na gCailleach Dubh; (Church of the Black Veiled Nuns) | 54°18′56″N 9°19′57″W |
| Kilmaine Monastery | | Gaelic monks, purportedly founded in the 5th century by St. Patrick; became prebendal church of Tuam | Cell-medhon | |
| Kilmore Monastery | | early monastic site | Kilmore by Termoncarragh; Teampall na Cille More | 54°14′03″N 10°03′06″W |
| Kilmore-Moy Monastery | | early monastic site, probably founded in the 5th century | Cell-mor-ochtair-muaide; Cell-mor-muaide; Kilmormoyle | 54°07′22″N 9°09′52″W |
| Kilnamanagh Friary ^{ø} | | purported Franciscan Friars — evidence lacking Cell-na-manach | | |
| Kilroe Monastery | | early monastic site, founded c. 5th century | Cell-ro; Cell-roe-mor | 54°12′35″N 9°12′25″W (approx?) |
| | | early monastic site, founded c. 7th century by St Lunecharia (Luineachair) | Cell-lunechuir; Killukin | 53°42′26″N 8°49′39″W (approx?) |
| Kilveny Friary ^{≈~} | | purported Franciscan Friars — evidence lacking Kilreny; Kilkeny; Kilkenny | | |
| Kinlough Monastery | | early monastic site, founded c. 8th century | Ceann-lacha; Cenn-lacha | 53°29′54″N 9°06′53″W |
| Knock Carmelite Monastery | | Carmelite nuns | Monastery of the Nativity, Tranquilla, Knock | 53°47′24″N 8°55′02″W |
| Knockor Friary ^{~} | | foundation, order and dissolution unknown; granted to John Rawson 1594 | Knocknor | |
| Lia na Manach Monastery | | early monastic site, possibly founded in the 5th century by St Patrick | Leac-fionnbaile; Lecc-finn | |
| Mayo Abbey | | early monastic site, Anglo-Saxon monks founded c. 671 by St Colman of Lindisfarne; supposed Benedictine monks — evidence lacking diocesan cathedral see transferred from Clogher 1152; see transferred to Clogher c. 1192; Augustinian Canons Regular secular college founded c. 1209; abbey status c. 1370, confirmed by the pope; dissolved after 1569; granted to John Rawson 1594; Benedictine 109 | St Michael ____________________; Mageo; Magneo; Temple Gerald; Elitheria | 53°45′36″N 9°06′58″W |
| Mayo Nunnery ^{≈} | | nuns founded in the 7th century? | possibly Domnach Kerne or Domnach-ceirne | |
| Meelick Monastery | | early monastic site | Mil-eac | 53°55′18″N 9°01′12″W |
| Moyne Abbey | | possibly Franciscan Friars Minor, Conventual? founded before 24 March 1455 by Lord Mac William de Burgo, purportedly at the instance of Father Nehemias O'Donohue, (Note: Analecta Hibernica No.6, 6 November 1834, Irish Manuscript Commission, ii, p.158) or 1458 by Thomas de Burgo, MacWilliam (or by a Baret (Note: Analecta Hibernica No.6, 6 November 1834, Irish Manuscript Commission, i, p.51) or Barry (Note: Louis Augustin Alemand, Monasticum Hibernicum, translated and edited by John Stevens, 1722)); Observant Franciscan Friars reformed (or founded) 1455; (Note: Analecta Hibernica No.6, 6 November 1834, Irish Manuscript Commission, iii, p.199)-60; (Note: Canice Mooney, O.F.M., Terminus, 1954, p.247) dissolved 1590, burnt by Bingham; ruinous by 1595; granted to Edmund Barrett; friars remained until another house was built in the vicinity (see immediately below) | Maighin; Maigne; Magyn; Moyen; Muaidhe | 54°12′08″N 9°10′38″W |
| Moyne Friary | | Observant Franciscan Friars — from Moyne Abbey (see immediately above) founded 1618 | | |
| Murrisk Abbey | | Augustinian Friars founded 1456, papal mandate for Hugh O'Malley, friar at Banada, to be licensed to build a monastery; Observant reformed 1458; dissolved 1578, friars expelled; granted to James Garvey; friars apparently later returned; | Leithearwmursge; Muirisce; Morasque; Morisk | 53°46′55″N 9°38′22″W |
| Murrisk Friary ^{≈} | erroneously purported Franciscan Friars, Third Order Regular (Note: Canice Mooney, O.F.M., Terminus, 1956, p.141) | | | |
| Oughaval Monastery ^{#} | | early monastic site, purportedly founded in the 6th century by St Colmcille (Note: Hubert Thomas Knox, Notes on the Early History of the Dioceses of Tuam, Killala and Achonry, 1904, pp.79,141,313) | Nuachongbhail | 53°45′34″N 9°39′30″W |
| Partry Monastery | | early monastic site, founded in the 6th century?, in the time of St Colmcille? | Obdacheara; Partraighe-ceara; Odbhacheara in Partragia | 53°40′53″N 9°17′52″W |
| Rathfran Priory | | Dominican Friars founded 1274, purportedly by a de Exeter (Note: James Ware, De Hibernia, et Antiquitatibus ejus, 1654 edition, p.223) (Dexter), possibly Steven de Exeter (Note: Hubert Thomas Knox, History of County Mayo, p.95) or Sir Richard de Exeter, (Note: J. Neary, Galway A.S. viii., p.19 and Lord Killanin and M. V. Duignan, Shell Guide to Ireland, 1962 (new edition 1967), p.328) or by a de Burgo, (Note: J. O'Heyne, O.P., Irish Dominicans (Epil. Chron...), (translated by A. Coleman, O.P., 1902), 1706) possibly William de Burgo; (Note: Tomas de Burgo, Hibernica Dominicana, 1762 edition) dissolved 1590, burned by Bingham's army; granted to William Taaffe 1596; (later history v. O'Heyne, Burgo, Coleman, RSAI and Mould) | Priory of the Holy Cross ____________________; Rathbran; Raithbrain; Rahrany | 54°14′17″N 9°14′40″W |
| Rosserk Friary | | Franciscan Friars, Third Order Regular founded before December 1441 dissolved c. 1578; lease granted to James Garvey; possibly later restored and dissolved 1590, burned by Bingham; granted to Edmond Barret 1595; suggested Observant Franciscan Friars (Note: J. Healy, The Catholic Encyclopedia, 1913-4, viii, p.641, refuted by Canice Mooney, O.F.M., communications) Ros-erc; Roisent; Rosserick | 54°10′17″N 9°08′36″W | |
| St Derivla's Monastery | | early monastic site, probably founded in the 6th century by St Dairbhile | | 54°05′46″N 10°06′25″W |
| Shrule Monastery | | early monastic site | Sruthair; Cloghuanaha | 53°31′08″N 9°05′27″W |
| Strade Friary | | Franciscan Friars Minor, Conventual founded c. 1240 (before 1252) by Jordan de Exeter, Lord of Athelthane or his son Stephen, at the bequest of the former's wife Basilia, daughter of Miler de Bermingham; Observant Franciscan Friars reform adopted unknown date dissolved 1252; Dominican Friars refounded 1252 or 1253; dissolved 1578? | The Holy Cross ____________________; Straide; Sraid; Ath-leathan; Ath-leayn; Ballylahan; Templemore | 53°55′17″N 9°07′42″W |
| Turlough Abbey | | early monastic site, possibly founded in the 5th century by St Patrick; probably ceased to be monastic long before church pillaged by Mac William 1236 | Turlach | 53°53′19″N 9°12′30″W |
| Urlaur Abbey | | Dominican monks founded c. 1430 by the Angulo (Nagle) family (later assuming the name MacCostello), papal license granted 1434; dissolved 1612; granted to Sir Edward Fisher; later granted to Lord Dillon (Viscount Costello-Gallen), a Catholic, who permitted a community of friars; dissolved c. 1654 | The Abbey Church of Saint Thomas, Urlaur ____________________; Urlare; Orlare; Orlare; Owrelare | 53°51′06″N 8°44′49″W |

== Map link to lists of monastic houses in Ireland by county ==
| Click on a county to go to the corresponding article. | Antrim; Armagh; Down; Fermanagh; Londonderry; Tyrone; Carlow; Cavan; Clare; Cork; Donegal; Dublin; Galway; Kerry; Kildare; Kilkenny; Laois; Leitrim; Limerick; Longford; Louth; Mayo; Meath; Monaghan; Offaly; Roscommon; Sligo; Tipperary; Waterford; Westmeath; Wexford; Wicklow |

== See also ==
- List of monastic houses in Ireland
