= Tigernan of Errew =

Tigernan of Errew, Irish missionary, fl. c. 500-520.

In his "History of Mayo" (page 31), Knox writes:

"St. Tigernan of Errew worked in Tirawley in the early part of the sixth century. His paten still exists. No more is known of him except he was the founder of Errew Abbey, Lough Conn, County Mayo. The Breastagh Ogham Stone near the king's house of Rathfran commemorates a "son of Cairbre, son of Amalgaid", who may be father or uncle of Tigernan, or a great-grandson of Fiachra Elgach."

He was patron saint of south Tirawaley. His cousin, Cuimín, was a contemporary of St. Aodhan, who died in 562. Cuimin was related to Aodhan, and worked as a Christian missionary in Tirawley, and perhaps Tireragh.

Errew - Oireadh - is a slender peninsula jutting out from the western shore of Lough Conn. The Mac Fhirbhisigh family believed themselves to be natives of the area (Ó Muraíle, 1996, p.6).

The present Abbey of Errew seems to have been built in the early-to-mid 12th century "under the influence of the Cistercians, but before Irish architects were familiar with it." (Knox, p. 49). This abbey appears to have been the ecclesiastical head of the Ó Lactna lordship of An Bac and Glen Nephin.

Gilla Áedha Ua Maigín, Bishop of Cork (died 1172), is noted in the Annals of the Four Masters as "of the family of Errew of Lough Con."
