= Aghalard Castle =

- Caisleán Achadh Leathard (Irish)
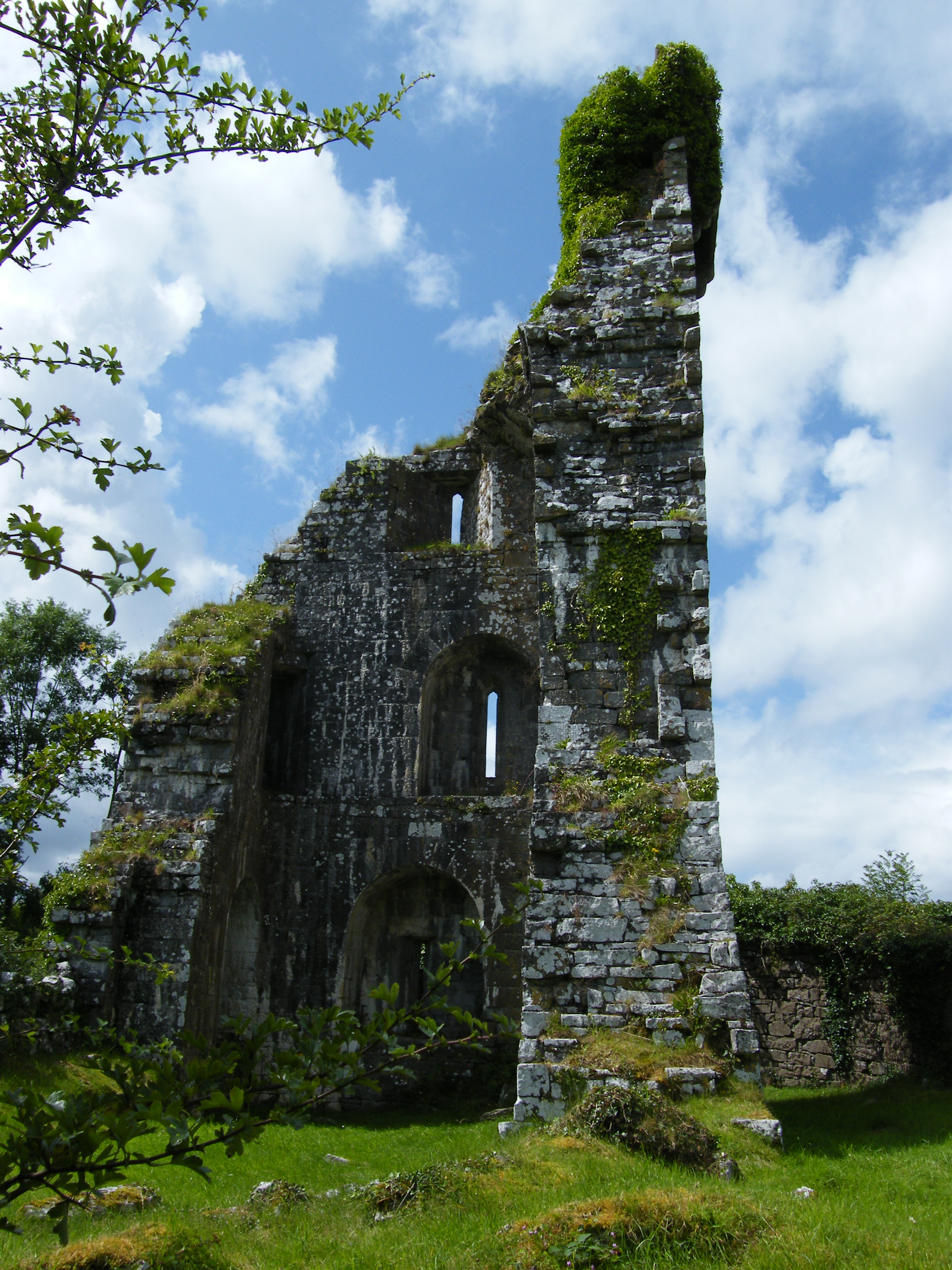
- Aghalard Castle in 2009

- Location within Ireland Location within the United Kingdom Location within Europe
- 53°33′22″N 9°17′56″W
- Type: tower house
- Location: Castlebar, County Mayo, Ireland

History
- Built: 1490

Site notes
- Height: 12 m (39 ft)
- Owner: State

National monument of Ireland

Aghalard Castle (Irish: Caisleán Achadh Leathard) is a ruined tower castle south of Castlebar, County Mayo, Ireland.

== History ==
Built in c.1490 by the descendants of the McDonnells of Knocknacloy who had become gallowglass to the Burkes of Mayo. The castle consisted of a three-storey tower with square turrets, enclosed by a bawn. The castle was captured in 1596 by Edward Brabazon, 1st Baron Ardee, Ulick Burke, 3rd Earl of Clanricarde and James Riabhach Darcy, however it was evacuated shortly afterwards upon hearing of the approach of Hugh Roe O'Donnell. It remained in possession of the McDonnells until bought by Sir Benjamin Guinness in the 19th century.
