= Errew =

Village in County Mayo, Ireland

Errew An tOireamh
- Village
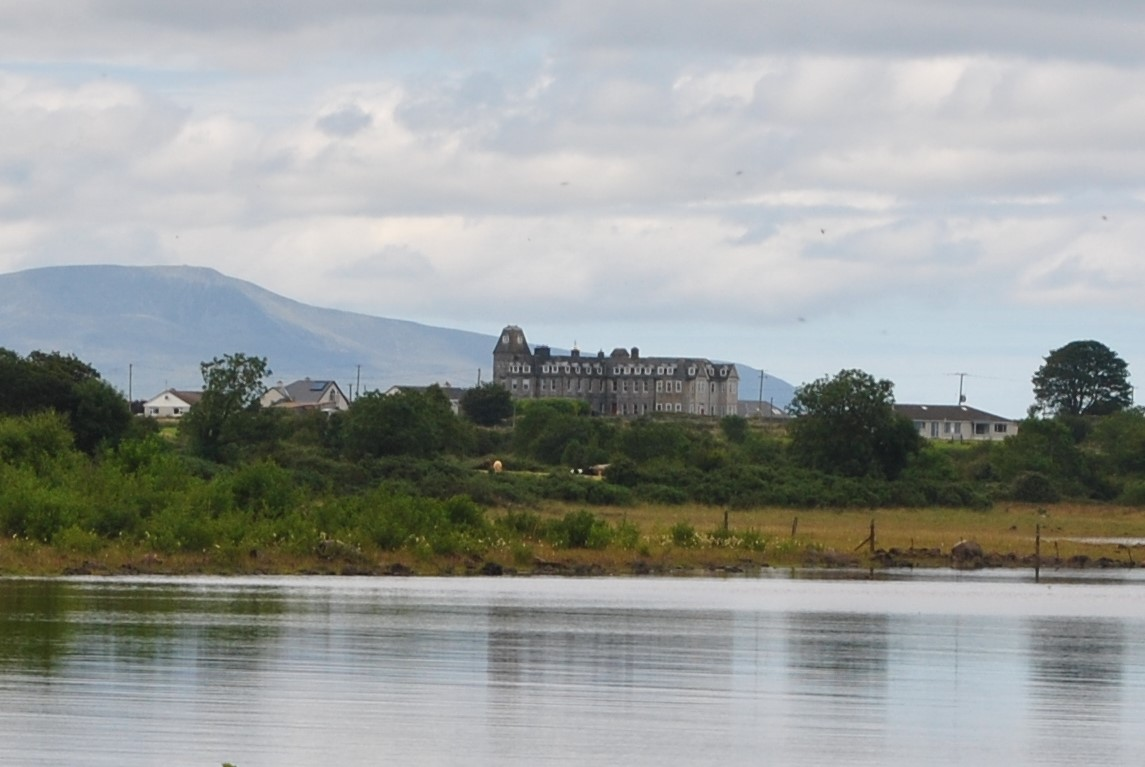
- Knox's Folly in Errew, now restored as apartments

- Location in Ireland
- Coordinates: 53°47′42″N 9°15′54″W
- Country: Ireland
- Province: Connacht
- County: County Mayo
- Time zone: UTC+0 (WET)
  - Summer (DST): UTC-1 (IST (WEST))

Errew (Irish: An tOireamh) is a small rural settlement, about 8 km south from the county town of Castlebar, County Mayo, Ireland.

The history of Errew follows the Franciscan monastery which was established in 1879 as a boys school which closed in 1975, the church in the monastery remained open until 1981. There are 22 Brothers buried in the Monastery cemetery.

Gilla Áedha Ua Maigín, Bishop of Cork (died 1172), is noted in the Annals of the Four Masters as "of the family of Errew of Lough Con."

Errew has a national school, and as well as a number of archaeological sites, such as forts, souterrains and fairy forts.

== See also ==
- Tigernan of Errew
- List of towns and villages in Ireland
