= Ballymore Lough =

Lake in County Mayo, Ireland

- Loch an Bhaile Mhóir (Irish)

- Location within Ireland
- Location: County Mayo
- Coordinates: 54.059°N 9.085°W
- Primary inflows: Owenrevagh River (from Cartron Lough and Lough Brohly)
- Primary outflows: Owenrevagh River
- Basin countries: Ireland
- Surface area: 0.707 km^{2} (0.273 sq mi)
- Surface elevation: 21 m (69 ft)
- Islands: 2
- Settlements: Attymass

Ballymore Lough is a freshwater lake in County Mayo, Ireland. It is overlooked by the ancient Kildermot Abbey.
