= Errew Abbey =

- Mainistir Oiridh
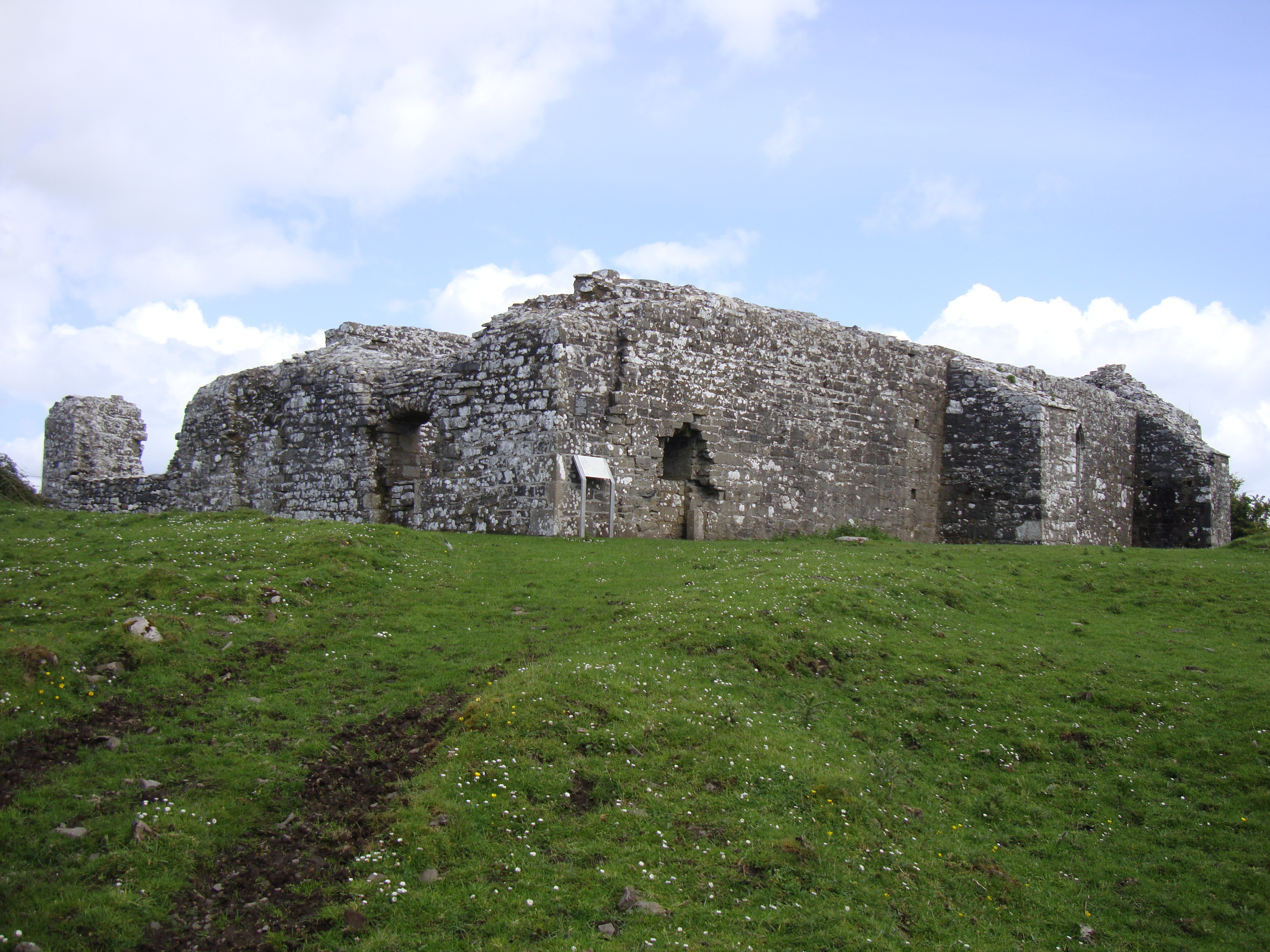
- External view of the ruins of Errew Abbey

- Location within Ireland
- Interactive map of Errew Abbey

Monastery information
- Other names: Aireach-lochacon; Aired-locha-con; Erew; Loch Conn; Oired; Oreab;
- Order: Augustinians
- Established: c. AD 500–520
- Disestablished: 1585
- Mother house: Crossmolina Priory
- Diocese: Killala

People
- Founder: Tigernan of Errew

Architecture
- Status: ruined
- Style: Cistercian

Site
- Location: Errew, Castlehill, County Mayo
- Coordinates: 54.053131°N 9.263349°W
- Public access: yes

Errew Abbey is a former Augustinian monastery and National Monument located in County Mayo, Ireland.

== Location ==
Errew Abbey is located on a peninsula stretching into Lough Conn. Templenagalliaghdoo lies immediately to the north.

== History ==
Tigernan of Errew is said to have founded a monastery here in the early 6th century. It was originally called "Mainistir Taobh Thiar do Shruth", "the abbey on the west side of the stream". Up to 1,400 students from all over Europe are claimed to have studied there.

It was refounded by the Barretts in the 12th/13th century.

Thomas Barrett, Bishop of Elphin, was buried here in 1404. In 1413 the Barretts founded an abbey for the Augustinian Canons, dedicated to the Virgin Mary; they seem to have made use of the buildings from the earlier foundation. Rather than a true abbey, it was more likely a priory cell dependent on Crossmolina Abbey.

In 1413, McWattin Barrett violated the sanctuary of Errew to seize Henry Barrett who had taken refuge there. Saint Tigernan is said to have appeared to McWattin every night until he promised to make amends; he gave the abbey an éraic of a quarter of land (ceathrú mír, about 120 acres) at Ballinbraher (Friarstown).

A family called O'Flynn were erenachs of the lands at Errew and came into the possession of Mias Tighernain, a paten said to have belonged to Tigernan.

Errew Abbey was dissolved in 1585.

== Building ==
There is a long rectangular church, measuring 27 × 7 m (90' by 22') which has retained some trefoil-headed windows, two sedilia and a piscina. The east side of the cloister is well-preserved, but it does not have the typical open arcade.

== Gallery ==
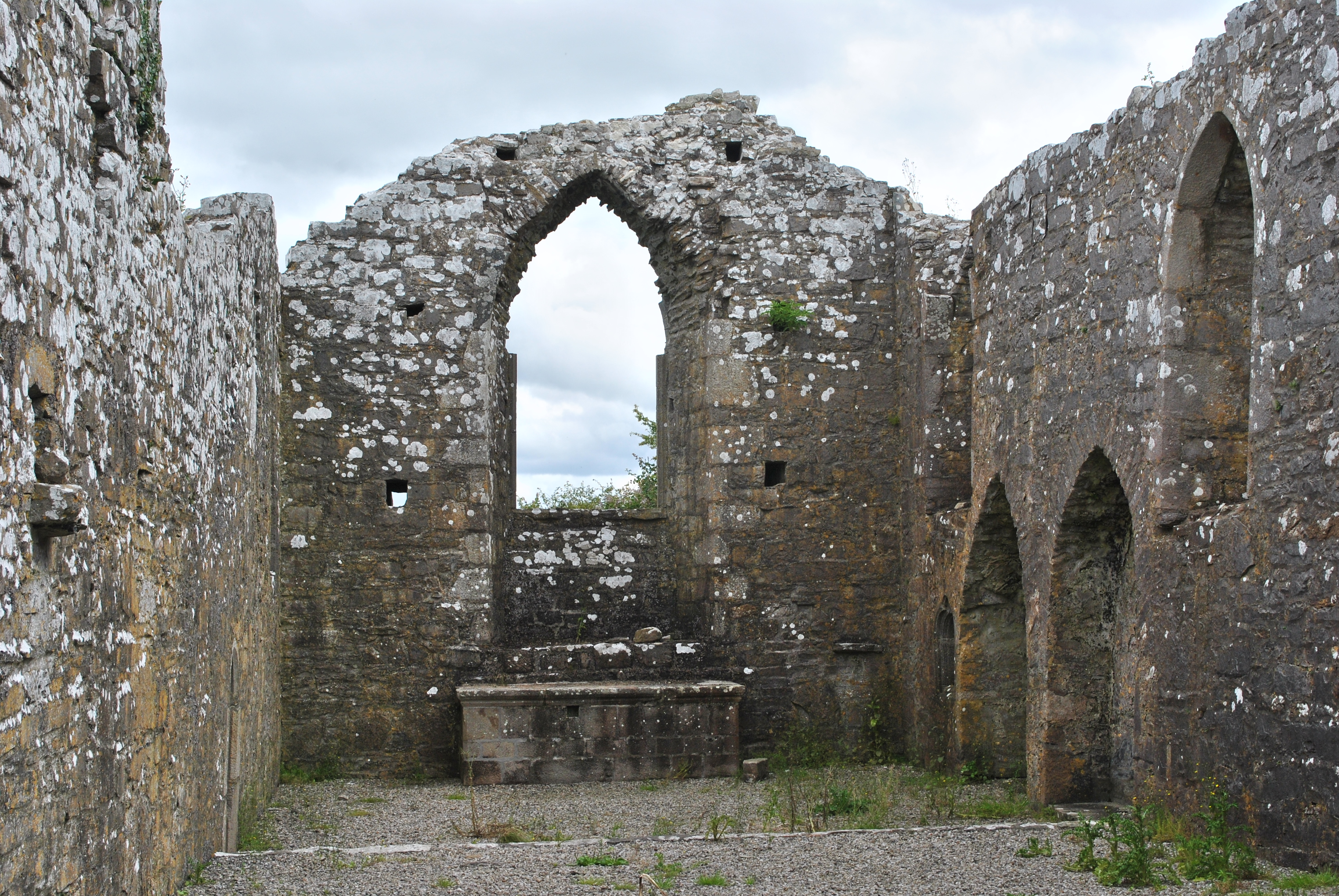

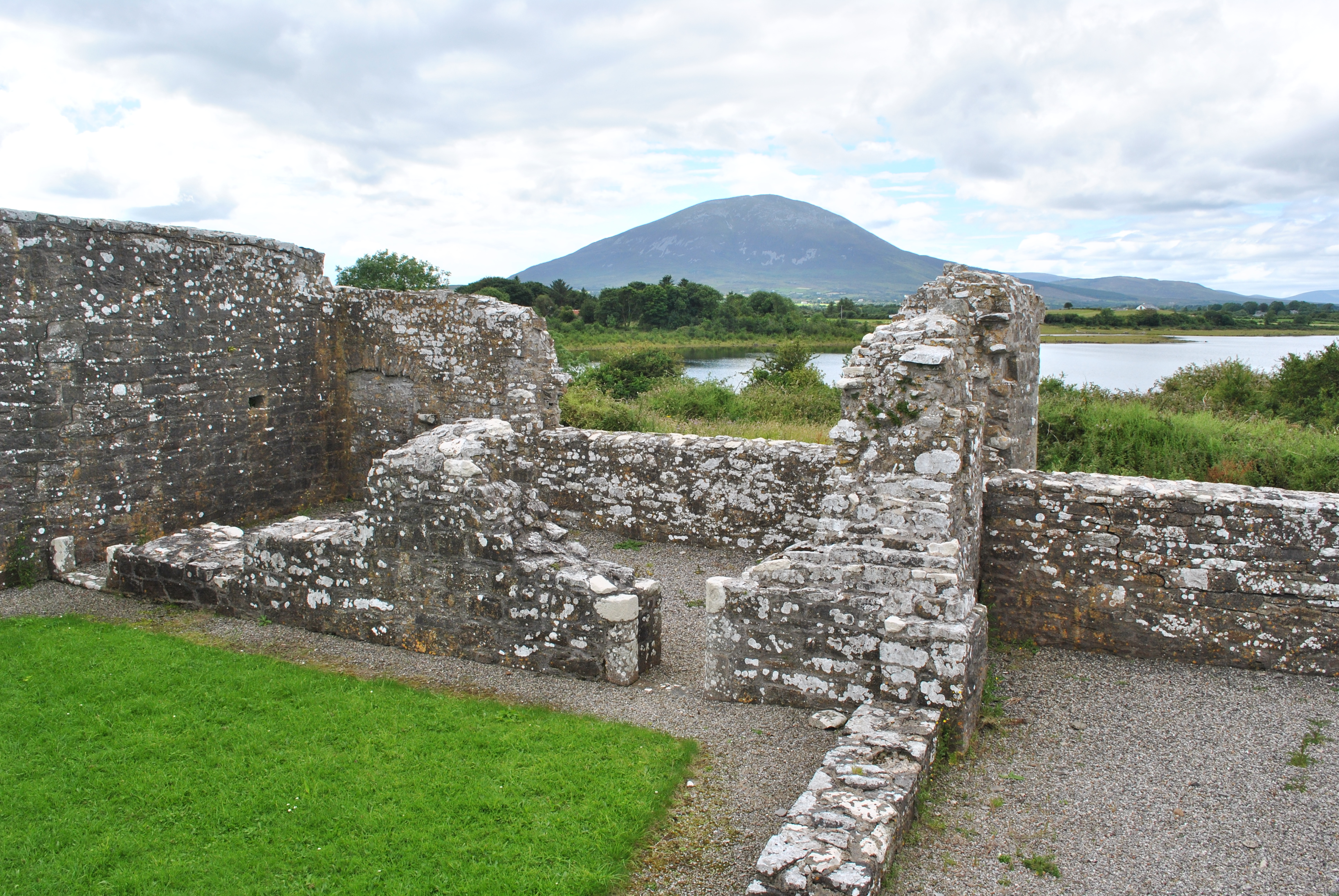

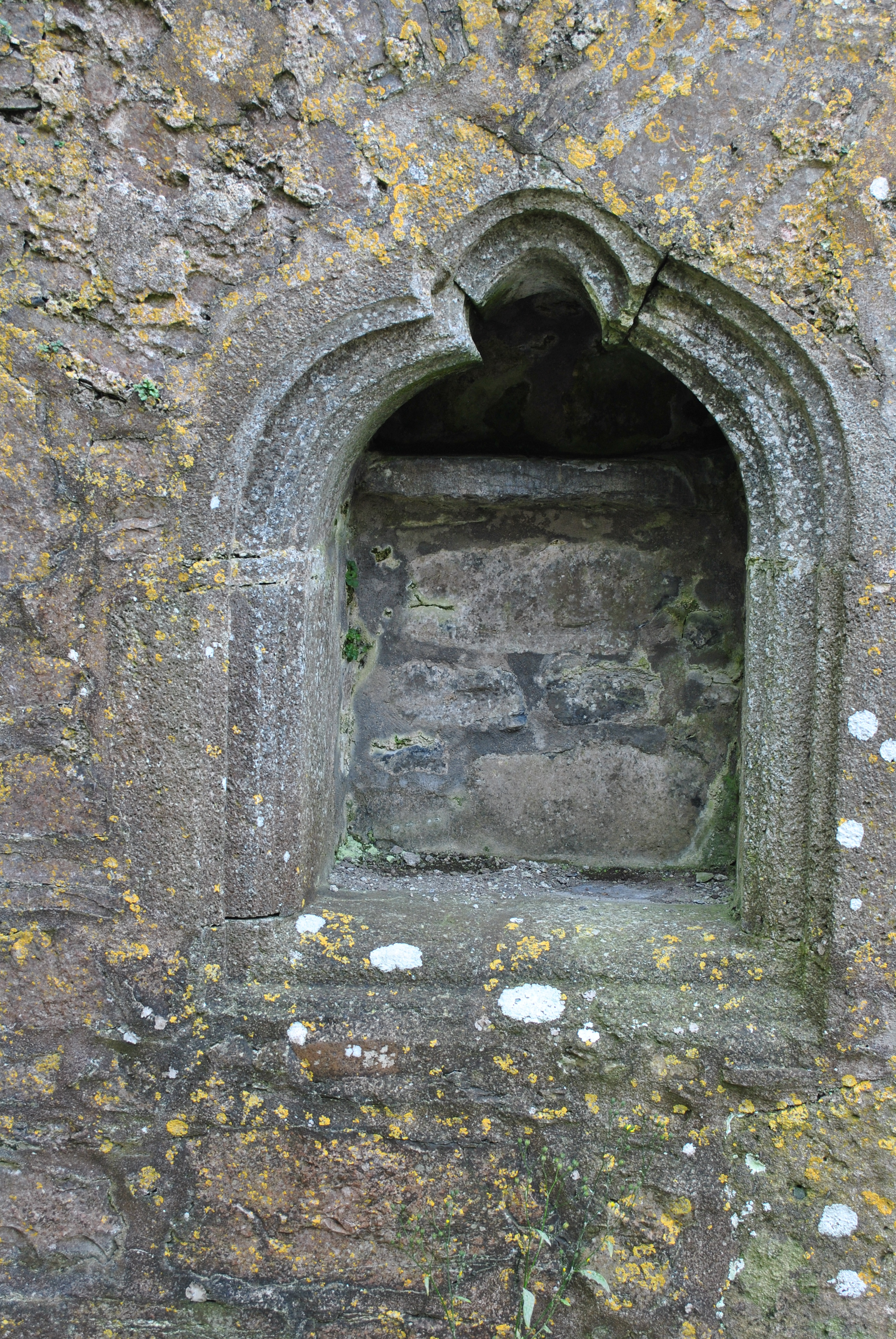
