= McDonnells of Knocknacloy =

The McDonnells of Cnoc na Cloiche, (pronounced: knock-na-cla-sha), better known to the Irish as Mac Domhnáill Gallogáigh, are an Irish Gallowglass clan and a branch of Clan Donald who were located in Knocknacloy, County Tyrone. They no longer have a clan chief and are not recognized by the Court of the Lord Lyon.

== History ==
They originated from the Kingdom of the Hebrides which became a part of Scotland with the 1266 Treaty of Perth and the signing of that treaty in 1312 by King Robert de Bruc. In the Kingdom of the Hebrides they were known as Clann-Somhaire taking the name under ancient Brehon Law from their common great-grandfather. In 1346 they became known as Clann- Domhnáill, taking the name of Somhairle's grandson Donnell who was their common great-grandfather at the time. This then became the clan's permanent name.

Their first chieftain was Eoin Dubh McDonnell, son of Alasdair Óg McDonnell, son of Aonghus Mor, son of Donnell. He had no permanent connection to the O'Neill Dynasty, but was in fact closely related to the McMahon clans and the O'Reillys. Eoin Dubh was assassinated in 1349, and his brother Raghnall was inaugurated the next Chieftain under tanistry. He can be identified by the pedigree of his grandson in the Book of Ballymote. Clann-MacDomhnáill Gallogláigh, all descend from Raghnall McDonnell (McDonnells of Cnoc na Cloiche). A number of good genealogies of the family from Somhairle in 1150 to 1700 A.D. have been translated from Gaelic to English including: 'Leabhar Mor na nGenealoch' in 2004, manuscript MS G-177 at the National Library of Ireland in 2022, and O'Cleirigh's Genealogies published in 1951.

== Errant genealogy ==
In 1898, Angus and Archibald MacDonald in their pseudo-history Clan Donald made an attempt to document the genealogy of the McDonnell of Cnoc na Cloiche. Neither author could read Gaelic thus they failed to access long existent genealogies. Nor did the authors realize that McDonnell chieftains were selected under Brehon Law of tanistry, not English primogeniture. Rather than the eldest son of a chieftain being next in line to be chieftain, McDonnell Gallogláigh chieftains were selected from the eligible male members of a derbfhine, with a derbfhine being defined as all members of a clan having a common great-grandfather. Thus a brother, son, nephew, first or second cousin, could be inaugurated the next chieftain. Angus and Archibald MacDonald's genealogy unwittingly has second cousins as fathers of succeeding chieftains, brothers as father's of their own brothers, etc. This text should be avoided by serious genealogists and historians of the family.

== Military actions ==
The McDonnells had a long history with Ireland, which many now believe dates back to the ninth century Vikings. In 1164, Somhairle joined with the Vikings of Dublin to battle invasion of the Kingdom of the Hebrides by the Scots. Donnell, from whom the family takes its name, was slain in Ireland in 1246 while assisting O'Donnell king of Tir-Connail in battle against the English. His son's Aonghus Mor and Alastair Mor assisted their nephew in taking the kingship of Tir-Connell fifty years later, and Aonghus Mor is credited with beginning construction of a monastery in City Armagh in 1264. In 1315, the family and their cousins the McRuaidres supplied 300 ships to move Edward de Bruc's 6,000 man army from Scotland to Ireland and declare Edward de Bruc king of Ireland. According to the Irish Annals, Donnell McDonnell was slain in 1318 and his cousins Alasdair Óg McDonnell and MacRuaidri were slain alongside Edward de Bruc by the English several months later.

In Ireland, the McDonnells first served as professional soldiers (gallogláigh) to the O'Connors kings of Conaught. They and their cousins the MacSuibnes, MacSheelys, MacDowells and the MacRuaidris, became the first of a new military class in Ireland. A second wave of immigration would follow, with marriage of Eoin MacDonald of the Clann-Donald of Scotland marriage to the Margarey Bissets in 1395, followed by a wave of MacDonald mercenaries to Scotland known as "Redshanks", in the 16th century.

About 1425, the McDonnells became the hereditary military body of the O'Neill, kings of Tir-Eoghan (Tyrone). They would serve the O'Neills until 1652 with the last of the McDonnell chieftains, Maolmuire, Aodh Buidhe, and Randall being slain during the Eleven Year War (1641–1652) while in the service of Sir Phelim O'Neill and Hugh O'Neill. For the family's services between 1425 and 1550 they were granted lands including Cnoc na Cloiche in Tyrone, lands near City Armagh and vast holdings in the Fews of southern Armagh.
