= Templenagalliaghdoo =

- Templum Monialium
- Teampall na gCailleach Dubh
- Location within Ireland
- 54.054360°N 9.263607°W
- Location: Errew, Castlehill, County Mayo
- Country: Ireland
- Denomination: Catholic

Architecture
- Functional status: inactive

Specifications
- Length: 7.7 m (25 ft)
- Width: 4.6 m (15 ft)
- Materials: stone

Administration
- Diocese: Killala
Designations
National monument of Ireland
- Official name: Templenagalliaghdoo
- Reference no.: 308

Templenagalliaghdoo is a medieval church and National Monument in County Mayo, Ireland.

== Location ==
Templenagalliaghdoo is located on a peninsula stretching into Lough Conn, immediately to the north of Errew Abbey.

== History ==
The name means "Church of the Black Nun." This church was built on the site of a previous church founded in the 6th century; it may have been an oratory or nunnery.

== Buildings ==
Templenagalliaghdoo is a small rectangular building with walls 50 cm thick and an entrance in the southwest, surrounded by a dry stone wall enclosure (17 × 23 m).
