= Rosserk Friary =

Ruined Franciscan friary in County Mayo, Ireland

Coordinates: 54.1714°N 9.1434°W

- Mainistir Ros Eirc
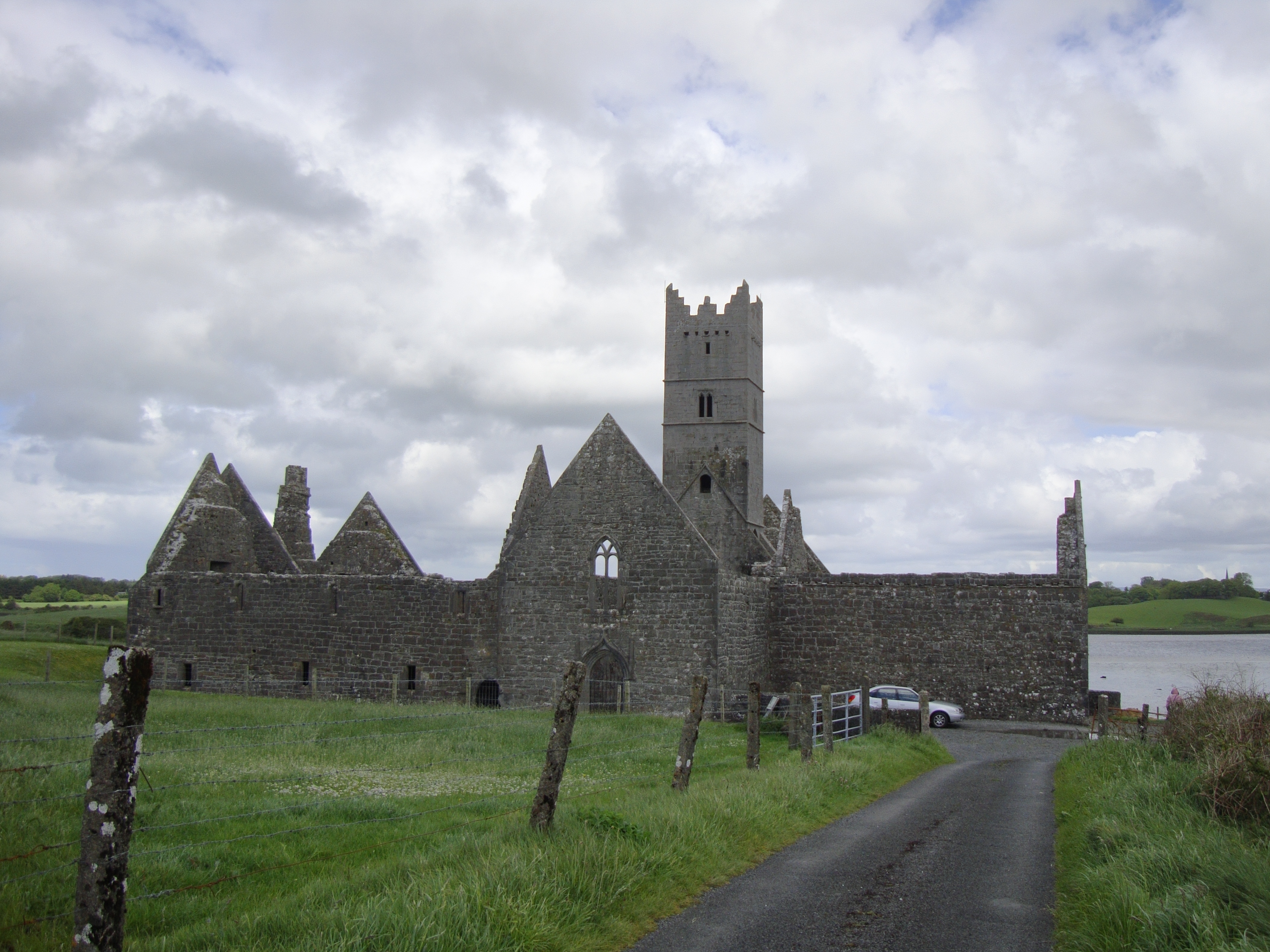
- Interactive map of Rosserk Friary

Monastery information
- Order: Franciscans
- Established: c.1440

Architecture
- Status: Inactive

Site
- Public access: Yes

Rosserk Friary is a friary in County Mayo, Ireland and a national monument. Located along the River Moy, the friary was set up by the third order of Franciscans.

== History ==
Rosserk Friary is one of the largest and best preserved of the Franciscan friaries in Ireland. It was founded by the Joye family circa 1441 for the Friars of the Franciscan Third Order Regular.

Rosserk Friary and Moyne Abbey are located close to each other, north of Ballina on the west side of Killala Bay. Both were allegedly burnt by Sir Richard Bingham, Elizabeth I of England's governor of Connacht, in 1590 in Reformationist zeal.

== Description ==
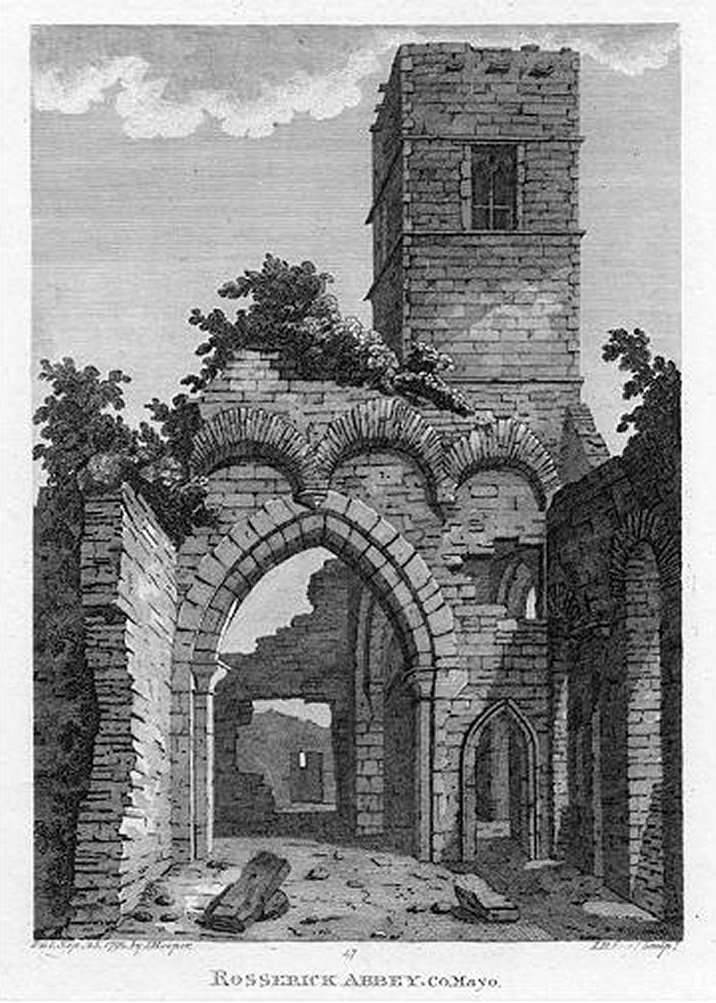
The Friary in 1791

Floor plan from 1791

The stone doorway leading to the church still shows fine workmanship and carvings. The church is built in the late Irish Gothic Style and consists of a single-aisle nave, with two chantry chapels in the south transept and a bell-tower suspended over the chancel arch. In the south-east corner of the chancel is a double piscina with a Round Tower carved on one of its pillars, two angels and the instruments of the passion.

The conventual buildings are well-preserved with three vaulted rooms on each side. The dormitory, refectory and kitchen were on the upper floor, where two fireplaces still remain back-to-back.

== Gallery ==
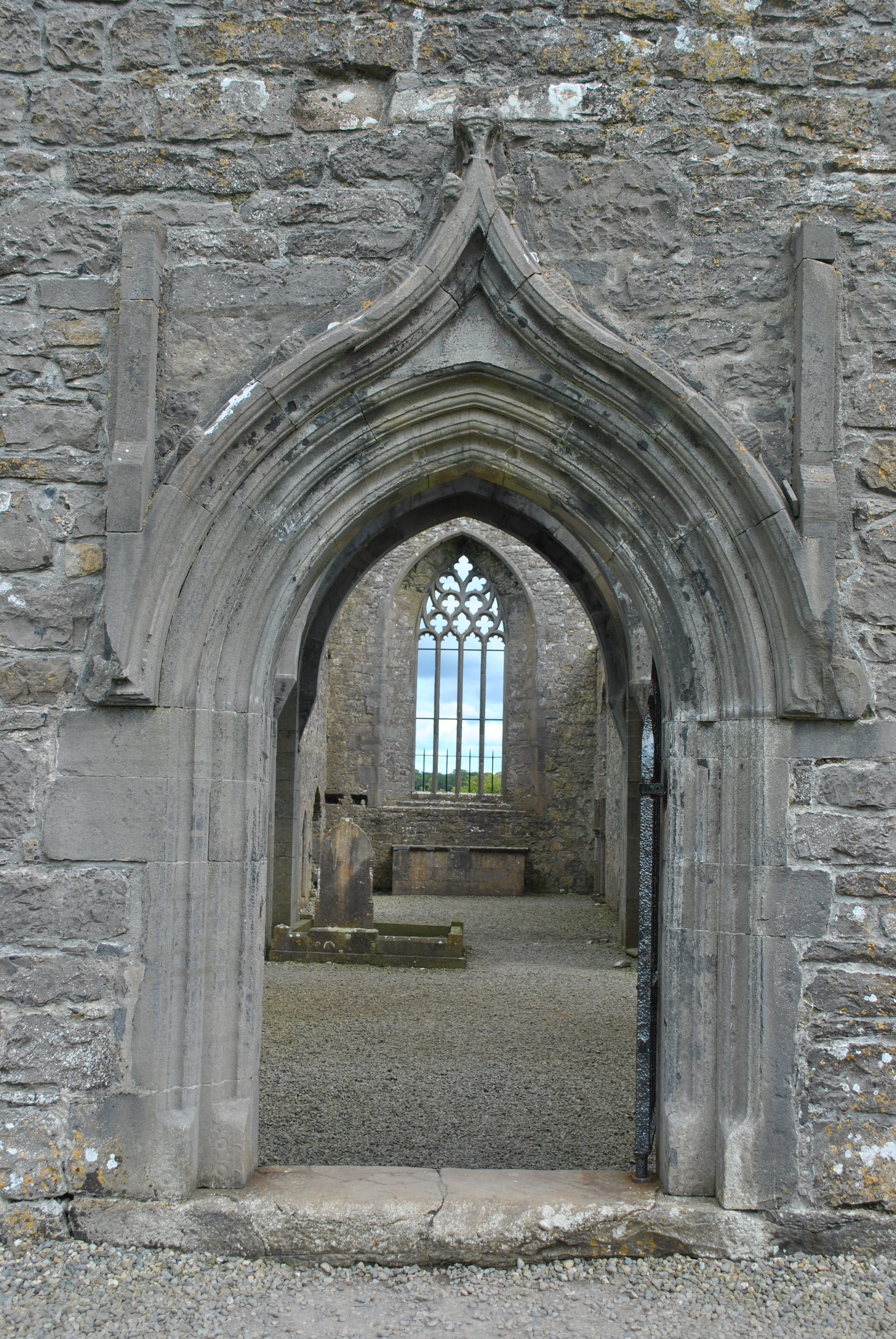

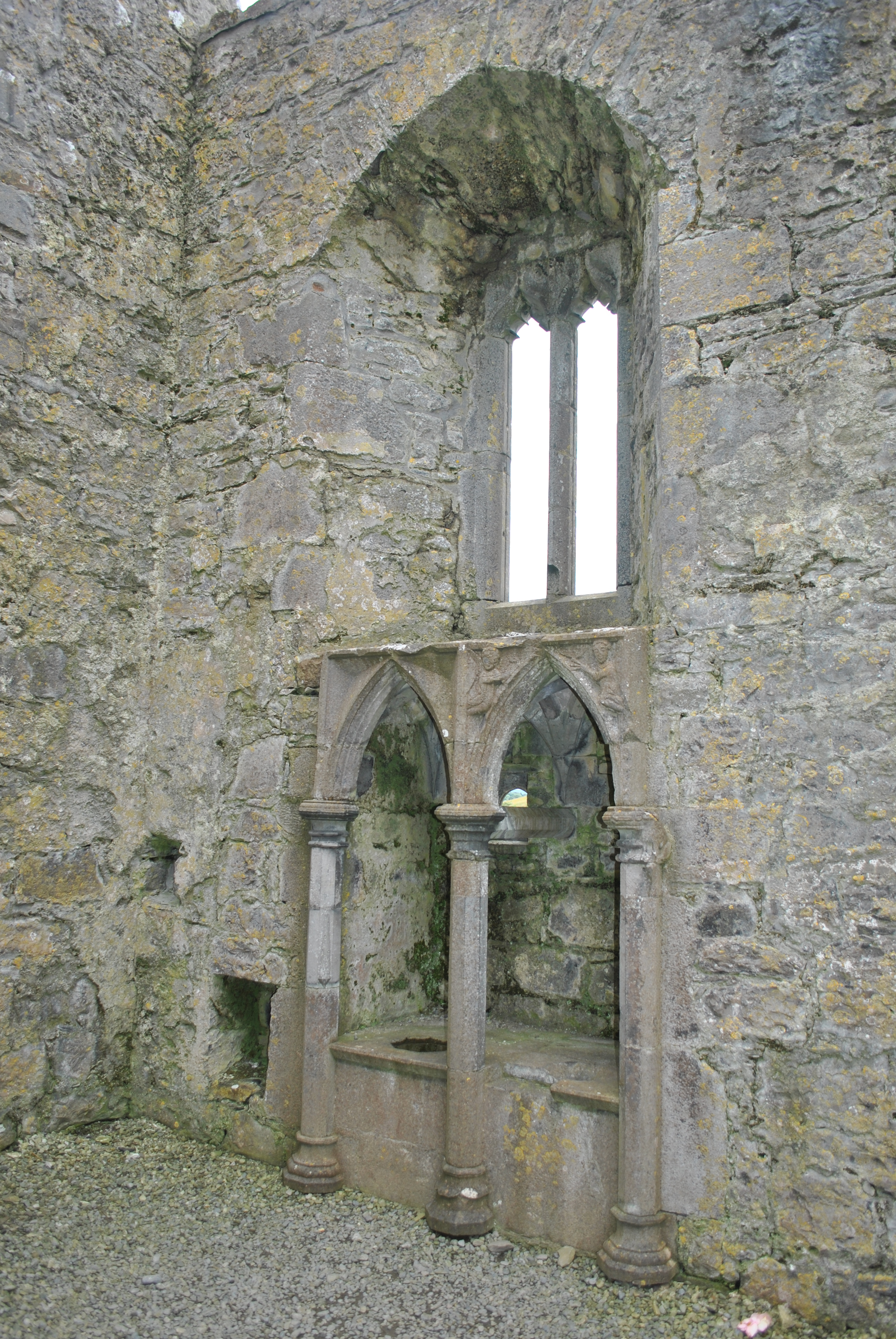

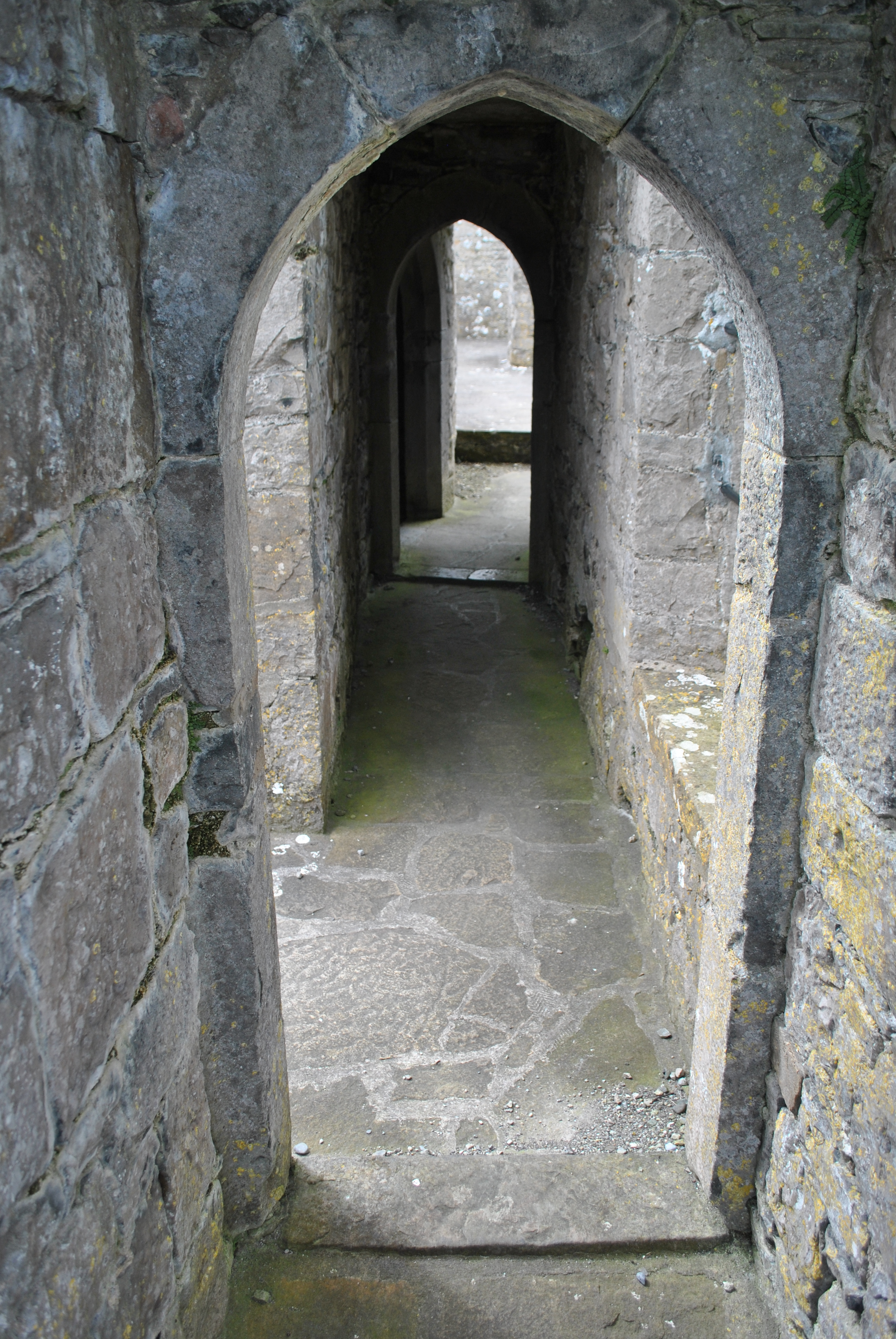

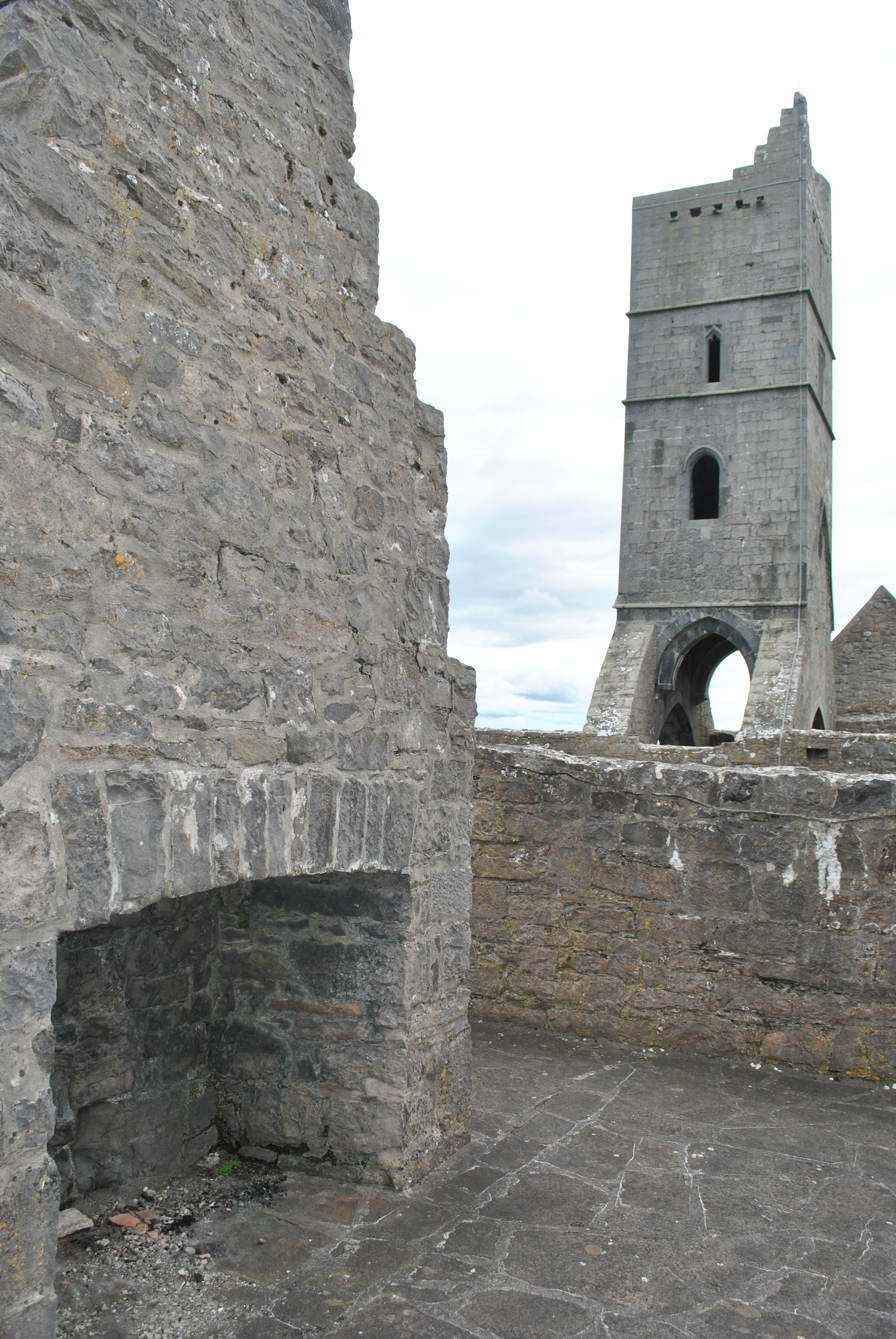

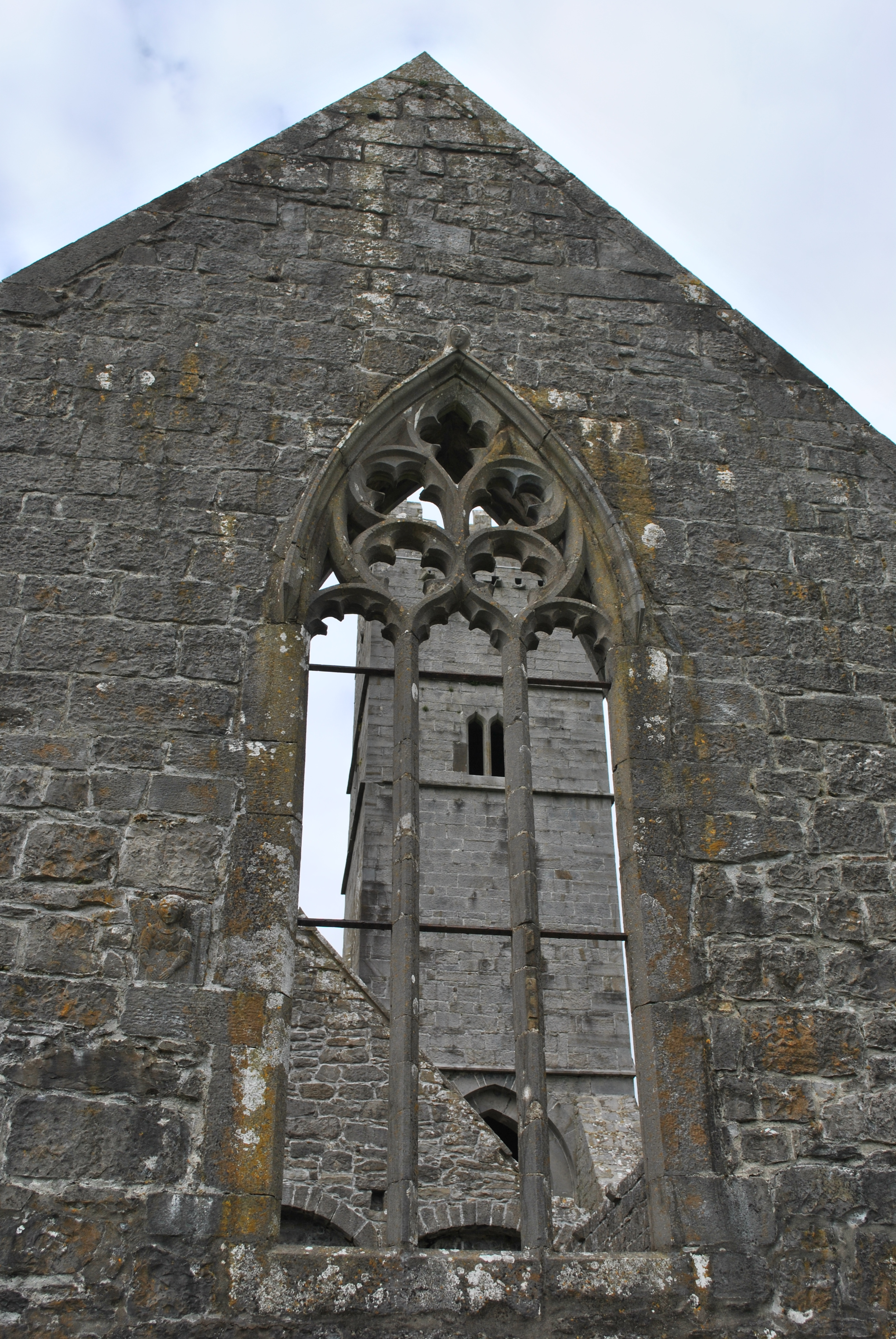

== See also ==
- List of abbeys and priories in Ireland (County Mayo)
