= Shrule Abbey =

Monastery in County Mayo, Ireland

- Mainistir Shruthair
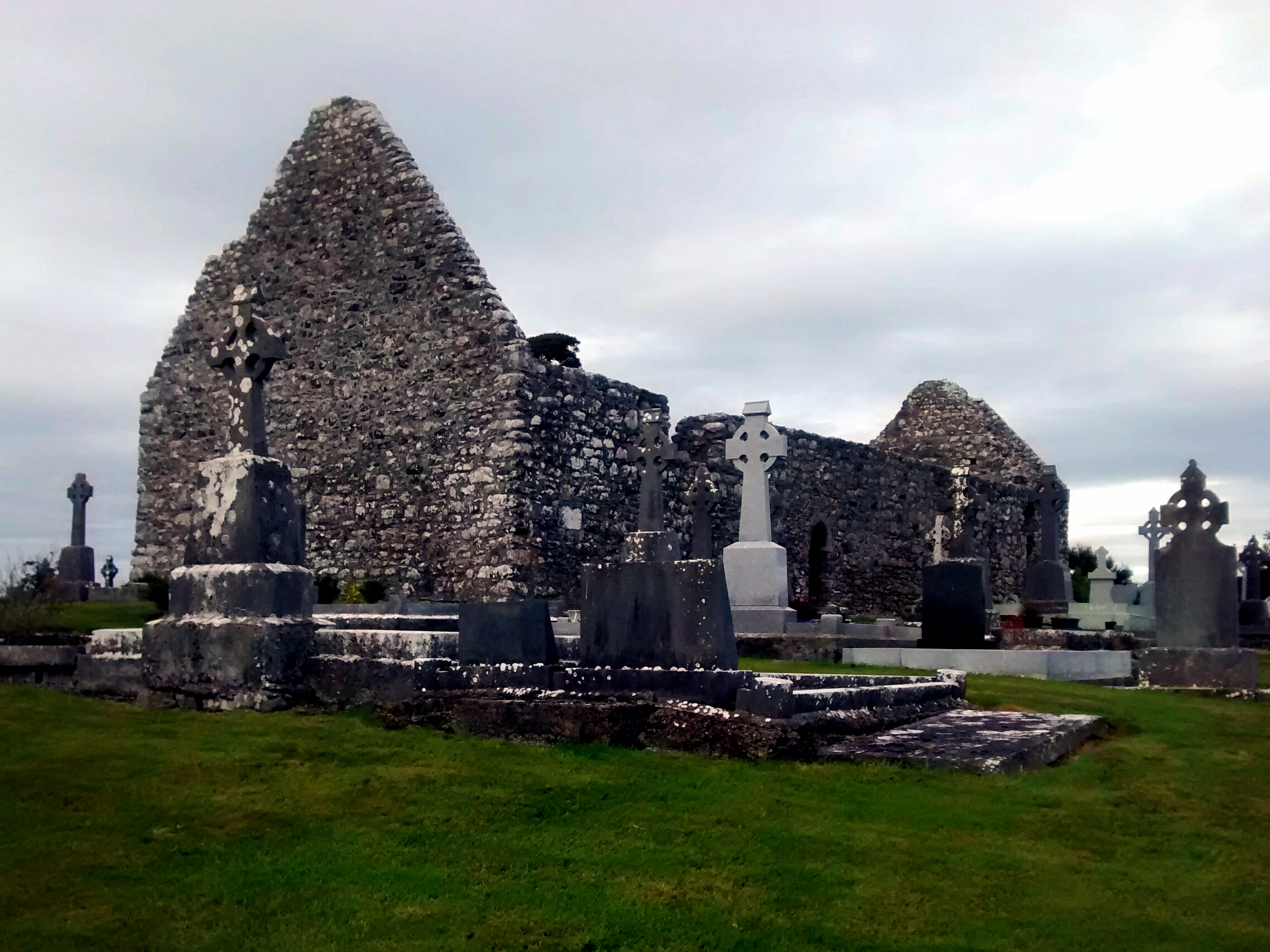
- St Colman's Church, north of Shrule Abbey

- Location within Ireland
- Interactive map of Shrule Abbey

Monastery information
- Other names: Cloghvanaha, Clogvanaha
- Established: 5th century
- Disestablished: 14th century?
- Diocese: Galway

People
- Founders: Saint Patrick, Felartus

Architecture
- Status: ruined
Heritage designation
Designations
National monument of Ireland
- Official name: Shrule Abbey
- Reference no.: 95
- Style: Celtic monastic

Site
- Location: Church Park, Shrule, County Mayo
- Coordinates: 53.518995°N 9.090615°W
- Visible remains: wall foundations
- Public access: yes

Shrule Abbey is a former monastery and National Monument located in County Mayo, Ireland.

== Location ==
Shrule Abbey is located to the southwest of Shrule village, north of the Black River and south of St. Colman's Church.

== History ==
According to tradition, Christianity was brought to Shrule by Saint Patrick himself in the 5th century AD. He founded a church at Donaghpatrick and left a disciple, Felartus, in charge. The ancient abbey of Cloghvanaha (Irish for "blessed stone") is believed to have grown from this site.

Shrule was formerly under the jurisdiction of Cong Abbey, then in 1152 it was placed under Annaghdown Abbey. The abbey was replaced by St. Colman's Church (Teampall Cholmain) c. 1200 as the main place of worship in Shrule. Clogvanaha is mentioned in the ecclesiastical taxation of 1306.

== Building ==
Little remains of this ancient abbey: only a rectangular mound (11 × 13.4 m; 12 × 14.7 yd) with masonry rubble visible in places.
