= Kildermot Abbey =

- Cill Diarmada
- Location within Ireland
- Interactive map of Kildermot Abbey

Monastery information
- Other names: Kildermot Church, Kildermott Abbey
- Order: Premonstratensians (Norbertines)
- Established: 13th century
- Diocese: Achonry

Architecture
- Status: ruined
Heritage designation
Designations
National monument of Ireland
- Official name: Kildermot Church
- Reference no.: 402
- Style: Norman

Site
- Location: Kildermot, Attymass, County Mayo
- Coordinates: 54.058363°N 9.090197°W
- Visible remains: church
- Public access: yes

Kildermot Abbey is a former Premonstratensian Priory and National Monument located in County Mayo, Ireland.

== Location ==
Kildermot Abbey is located on the west bank of Ballymore Lough, 1 km northwest of Attymass.

== History ==
Kildermot Abbey was founded Premonstratensian Canons (Norbertines), who were already established in the area at this time.

It is possible the Abbey and its townland are now known as Kildermot due to patronage by the Mac Diarmada; no connection to any St Dermot can be claimed.

The Abbey was partially destroyed after the Penal Laws of 1697.

Two holy water fonts from the Abbey were recovered from the lake by a Mr. Thomas Gallagher. One has been returned to the Abbey, while the other is in the National Museum of Ireland.

Kildermot Abbey became a National Monument in 1939.

Dawn Mass is celebrated annually at the ruins on Easter Sunday.

== Building ==
The church's west gable is pulled down, but the foundation is still traceable. Its side walls and east gable remain.

In this gable is a lancet window, widened inside and arched above, fashioned of rudely cut stones. The whole church measures 5.5 m × 3.5 m (18 ft × 11 ft).
