= Inishmaine Abbey =

Ruined Augustinian monastery in County Mayo, Ireland

- Mainistir Inis Meáin
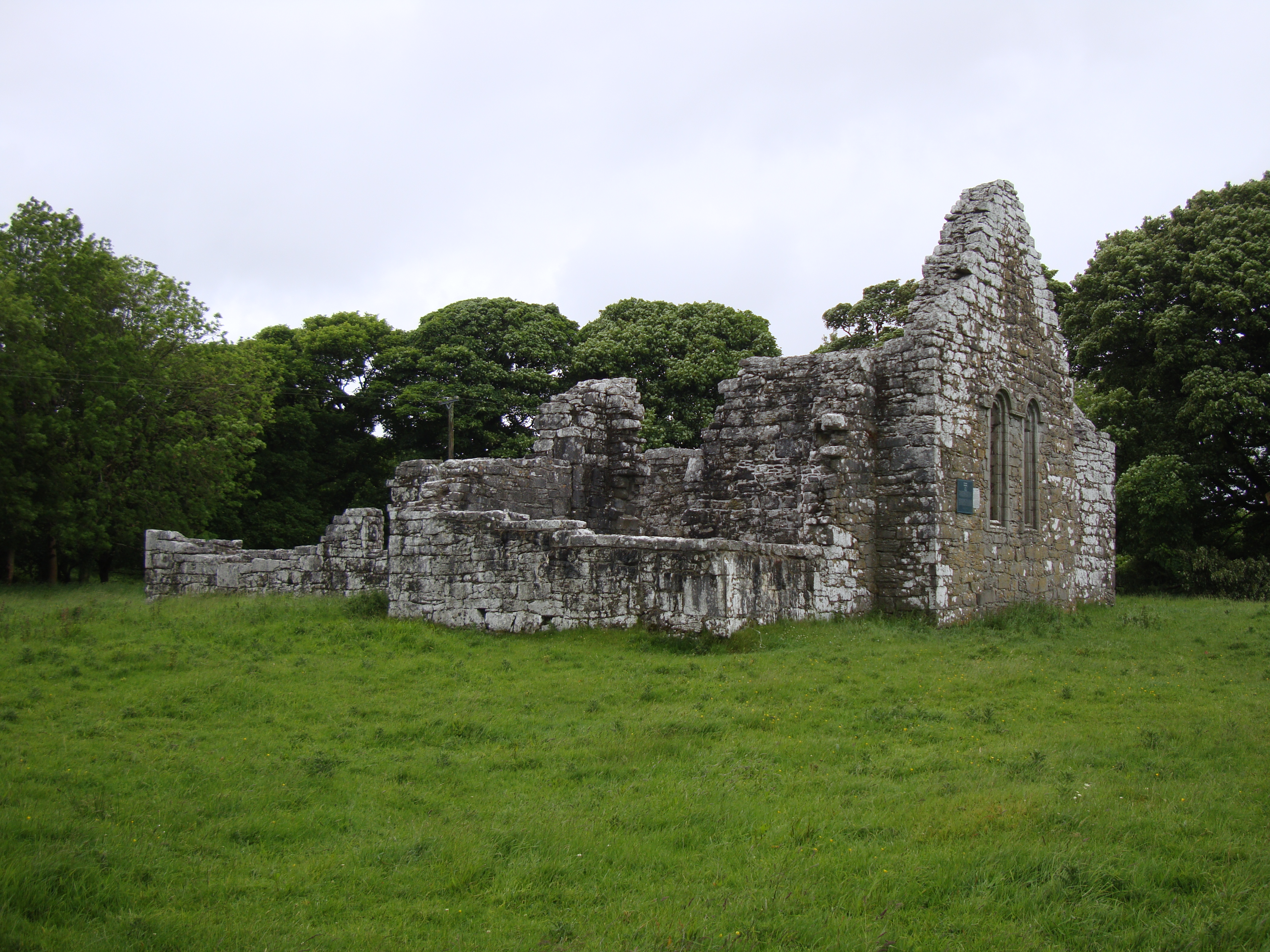

- Location within Ireland
- Interactive map of Inishmaine Abbey

Monastery information
- Other names: Inis-medhon, Inis-meadhoin, Inis-meadhon, Inchmean
- Order: Augustinians
- Established: 7th century
- Disestablished: c. 1587
- Mother house: Kilcreevanty Abbey
- Diocese: Tuam

People
- Founder: Corbmac

Architecture
- Status: ruined
- Style: Norman

Site
- Location: Inishmaine, Ballinrobe, County Mayo
- Coordinates: 53.598092°N 9.301341°W
- Visible remains: church, gatehouse
- Public access: yes

Inishmaine Abbey is a former Augustinian monastery and National Monument located in County Mayo, Ireland.

== Location ==
Inishmaine Abbey is located on the eastern shores of Lough Mask, southwest of Ballinrobe. It once stood on an island, but canal construction lowered the water level and it is now on a peninsula.

== History ==
Inishmaine was an early monastic site, founded in the 7th century by St Corbmac.

It was refounded after 1223 and settled by Arroasian Augustinian nuns (possibly from Annaghdown Nunnery) and was dependent on Kilcreevanty.

During the Dissolution of the monasteries Inishmaine Abbey was dissolved c. 1587. During the troubles of the 17th century the Abbey was burned down.

== Building ==
All that remains is the 13th century church and 15th century gatehouse. A number of ashlar blocks in the nave and the lintelled north doorway may have come from an earlier structure. There are carved capitals on the chancel arch.

The twin east window is also decorated in mouldings of wild and mythical animals.
