= Murrisk Abbey =

Ruined Augustinian friary in Mayo, Ireland

Coordinates: 53.7820°N 9.6395°W

- Mainistir Mhuraisce
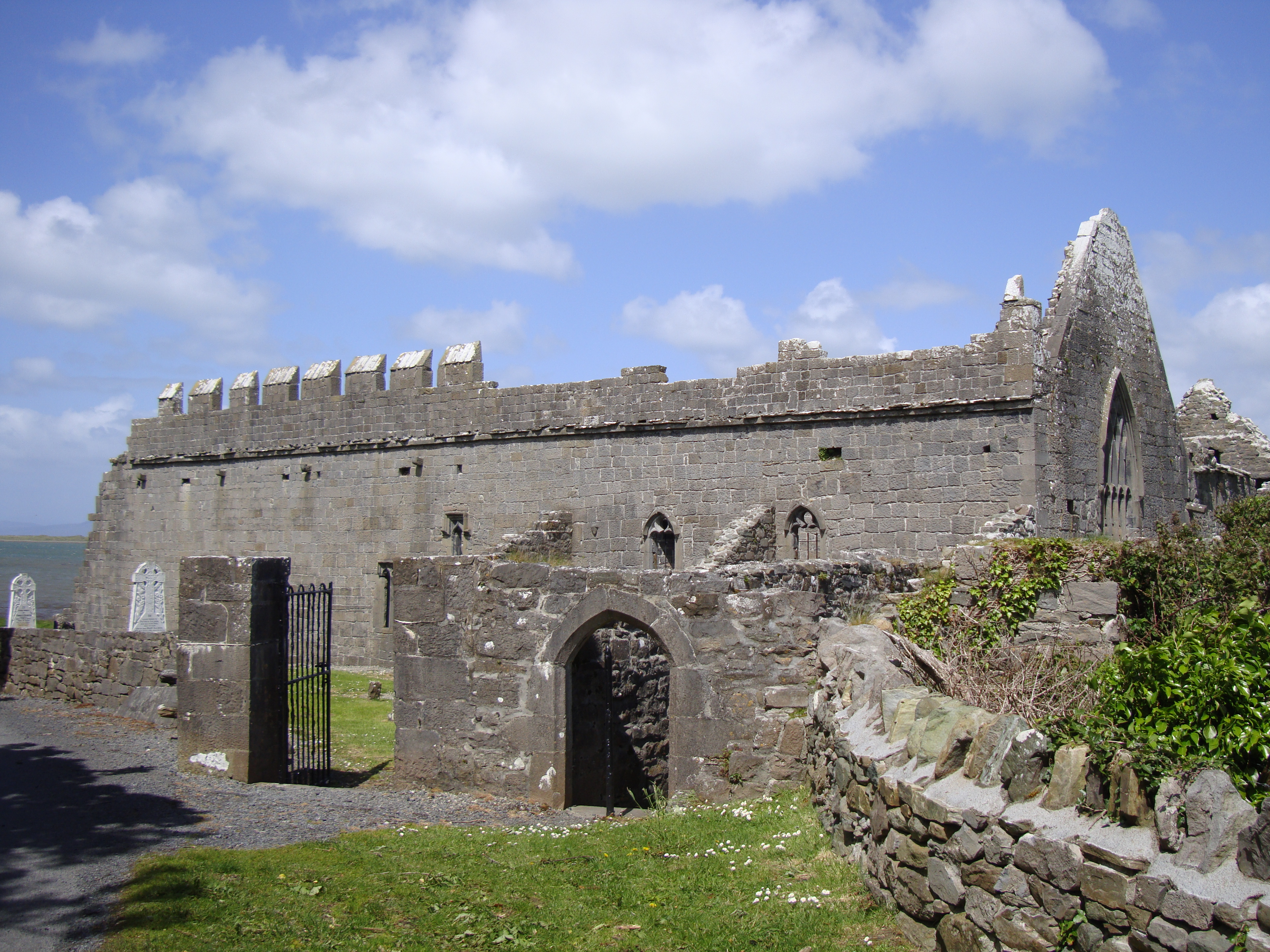

Monastery information
- Order: Augustinians
- Denomination: Roman Catholic Church
- Established: 1457
- Disestablished: 1577

People
- Founder(s): Hugh O'Malley

Architecture
- Status: Inactive

Site
- Location: County Mayo, Ireland
- Public access: Yes

National monument of Ireland
- Official name: Murrisk Abbey
- Reference no.: 196

Murrisk Friary (Irish: Mainistir Mhuraisce), is a ruined Augustinian monastery located in County Mayo, Ireland. It is on the southern coast of Clew Bay, about 10km west of Westport.

Founded in 1457, the site the friary built on is reputed to be that of the original church founded by Saint Patrick.

== History ==
The abbey was likely founded by an Ó Máille, one of the Kings of Umhaill, in either the 14th or 15th century, potentially in 1457.

Lands were granted by Thady O'Malley in 1457 to Hugh O'Malley of Banada Friary, County Sligo who was granted permission by Callixtus III to establish a church and priory at Croagh Patrick because "the inhabitants of those parts have not hitherto been instructed in their faith."

The Westport Chalice was made for the friary in 1724.

All that is left of Murrisk Abbey today are ruins consisting of a church with one central aisle (with battlemented walls and a fine east window), and the east wing of the Friary buildings. Behind the main altar space, the east window is the finest feature of the ruins. There was a belfry tower at the west end of the church, all that now survives of this tower is a vault. The church also contained the tombs of the family that founded it.

Despite being suppressed at the reformation, the friary continued until 1577 when the friars were driven out – in common with friars of other Augustinian friaries, the friars remained locally ministering to their people.
