= Castlehill, County Mayo =

Castlehill Caorthannán
- Village
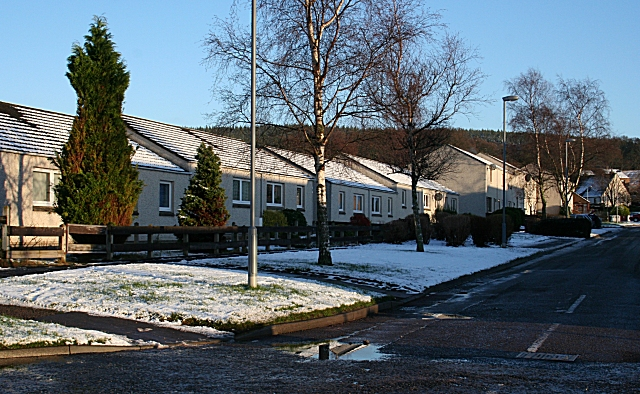
- Houses on Castlehill Road

- Location in Ireland
- Coordinates: 54°03′06″N 9°20′21″W
- Country: Ireland
- Province: Connacht
- County: County Mayo
- Elevation: 24 m (79 ft)
- Time zone: UTC+0 (WET)
  - Summer (DST): UTC-1 (IST (WEST))
- Irish Grid Reference: G123122

Castlehill (Irish: Caorthannán) is a townland and village near the west coast of Lough Conn in County Mayo, Ireland. Historically it was called Keerhannaun or Keerhanaun, which are anglicisations of its Irish name.

== See also ==
- List of towns and villages in the Republic of Ireland
