= Clare Island Abbey =

Former Cistercian monastery in County Mayo, Ireland

- Mainistir Chliara
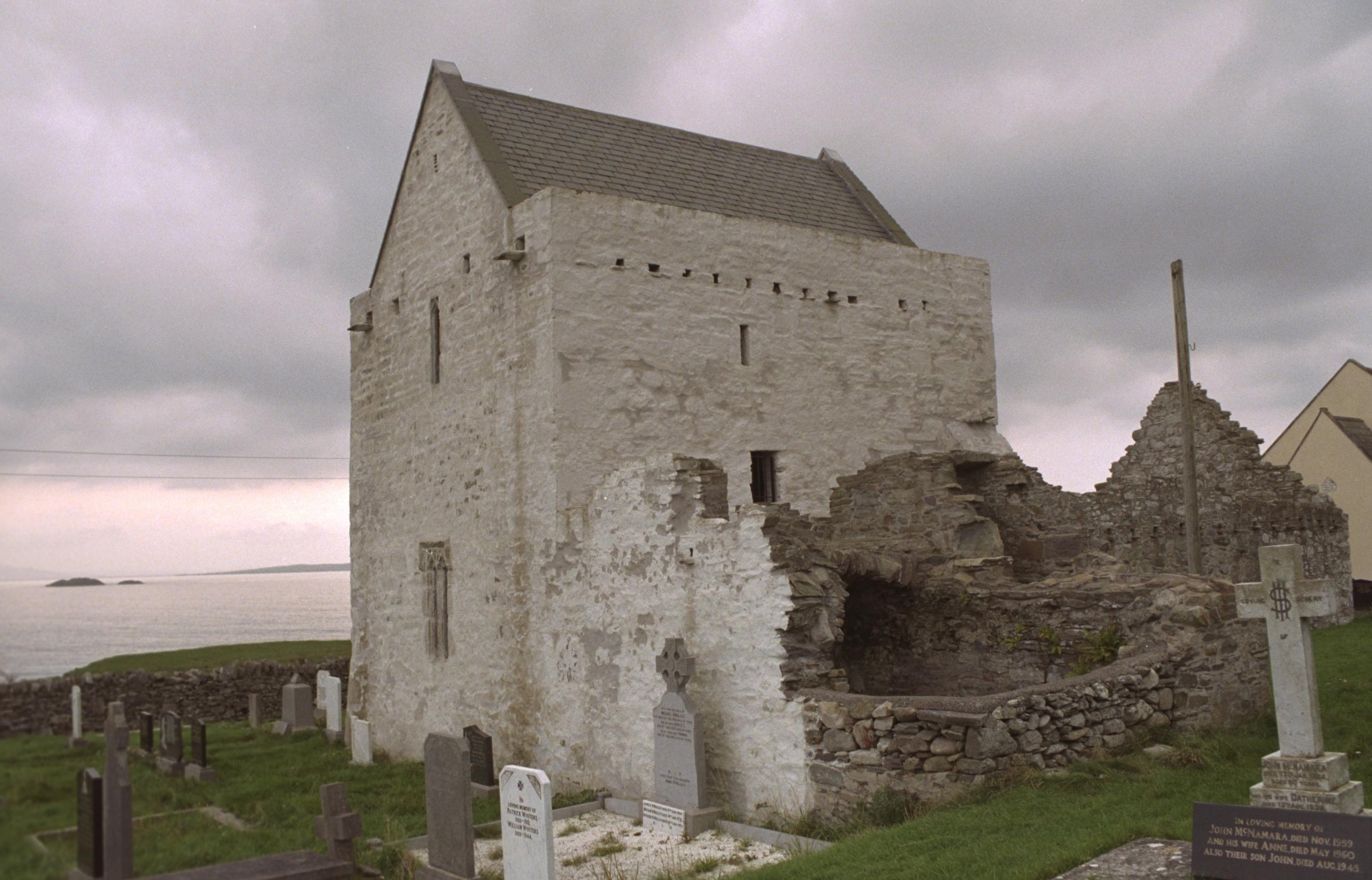
- Abbey viewed from the northeast

- Location within Ireland
- Interactive map of Clare Island Abbey

Monastery information
- Other names: St. Brigid's Abbey, Mainister-ni-clarch; Cliara; Cleara; Clara; Insula Maris; Oilen-ui-maile
- Order: Cistercians
- Established: 12th century
- Disestablished: 17th century
- Mother house: Knockmoy Abbey
- Diocese: Tuam

Architecture
- Status: inactive
- Style: Cistercian

Site
- Location: Lecarrow, Clare Island, County Mayo
- Coordinates: 53.793229°N 9.989088°W
- Public access: yes

Clare Island Abbey, officially St. Brigid's Abbey, is a former Cistercian monastery and National Monument located in Clare Island, County Mayo, Ireland.

== Location ==
Clare Island Abbey is located in the centre of the south part of Clare Island, near the post office.

== History ==
Saint Bridget`s Abbey was founded in the 12th/13th century and in 1224 became a cell of Knockmoy Abbey, a Cistercian abbey near Tuam.

It was rebuilt c. 1460. It contains numerous tombs of the local ruling family, the Ó Máille (O'Malley) and tradition claims it as the site of the baptism, marriages and burial of Gráinne "Grace" O'Malley (c. 1530 – c. 1603), the famous "pirate queen." She is believed to have been interred at the O'Malley tomb which has a canopy.

The abbey was probably dissolved during the late 16th century. Later it was a place of refuge for Carmelite Friars.

== Building ==
The abbey is furnished with piscina, sedilia, carved heads and ogee and cusp-headed lancet windows.

Clare Island Abbey contains a series of medieval wall and ceiling paintings. They depict mythical, human and animal figures including dragons, a cockerel, stags, men on foot and on horseback, a harper, birds and trees. Such ornamentation is unusual for a Cistercian foundation.
