= Burrishoole Friary =

Ruined Dominican friary in Mayo, Ireland

- Mainistir Bhuiríos Umhaill
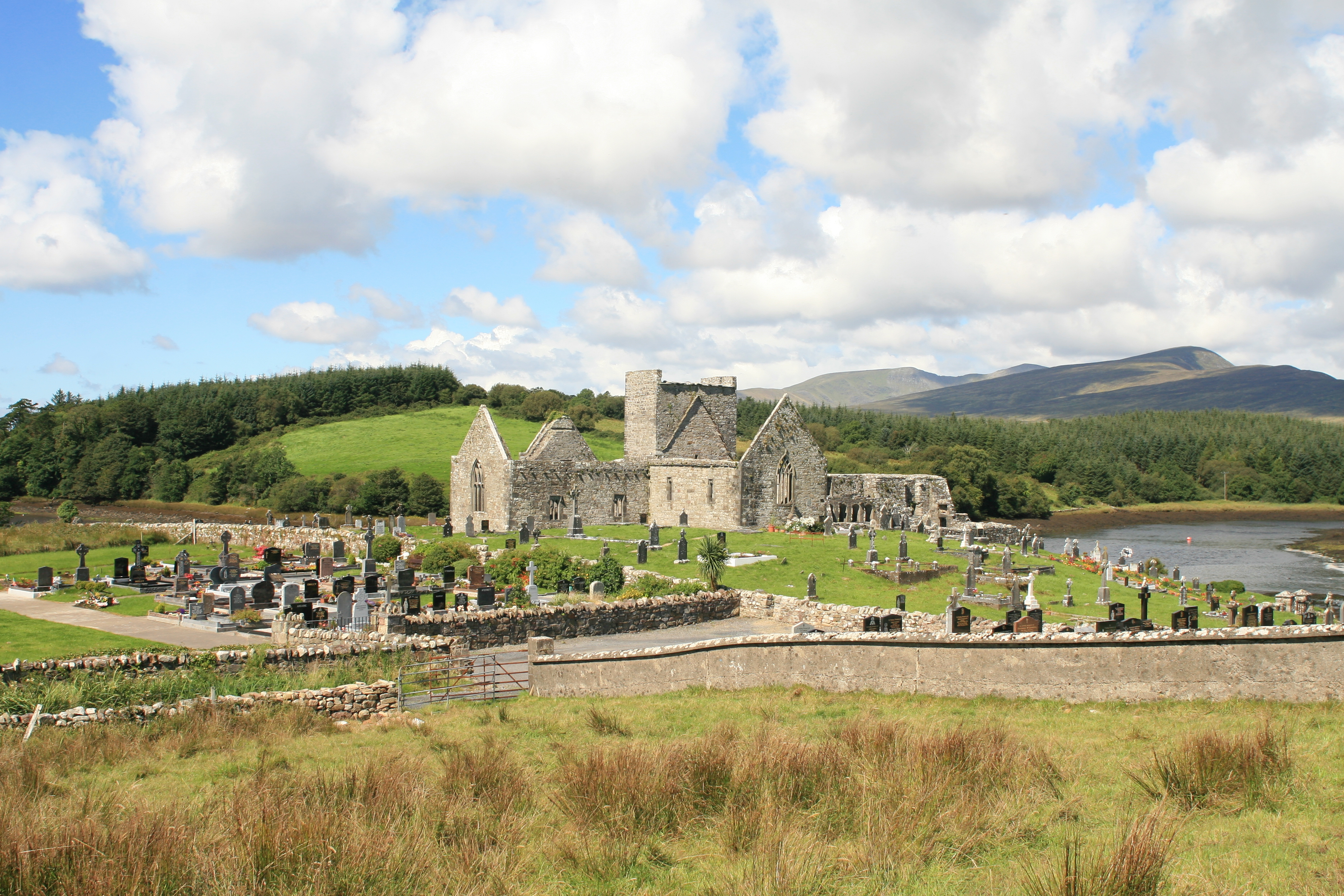

- Location within Ireland

Monastery information
- Order: Dominican Order
- Established: 1470
- Disestablished: 1606
- Diocese: Killala

People
- Founders: Richard de Burgo of Turlough, Lord MacWilliam Oughter

Architecture
- Status: Inactive
- Style: Gothic

Site
- Location: County Mayo, Ireland
- Coordinates: 53°53′55″N 9°34′19″W
- Visible remains: Church
- Public access: Yes

Burrishoole Friary (Irish: Minister Bhuiríos Umhaill) was a Dominican friary in County Mayo, Ireland, located a few kilometers west of the town of Newport, County Mayo. Its ruin is a National Monument.

Burrishoole Friary was founded c. 1469 by Richard de Burgo of Turlough, Lord MacWilliam Oughter. It was built without the permission of Pope Paul II (term 1464–1471). In 1486, Pope Innocent VIII (term 1484–1492) instructed Uilliam Seóighe, the Archbishop of Tuam (term 1485–1501) to forgive the friars.

The church and the eastern wall of the cloister remain. The grounds of the friary are an actively used cemetery.

The Friary is often called "Burrishoole Abbey", although this colloquial name is inaccurate because the Dominican order did not have abbots; Dominican houses are not technically abbeys.

== Gallery ==
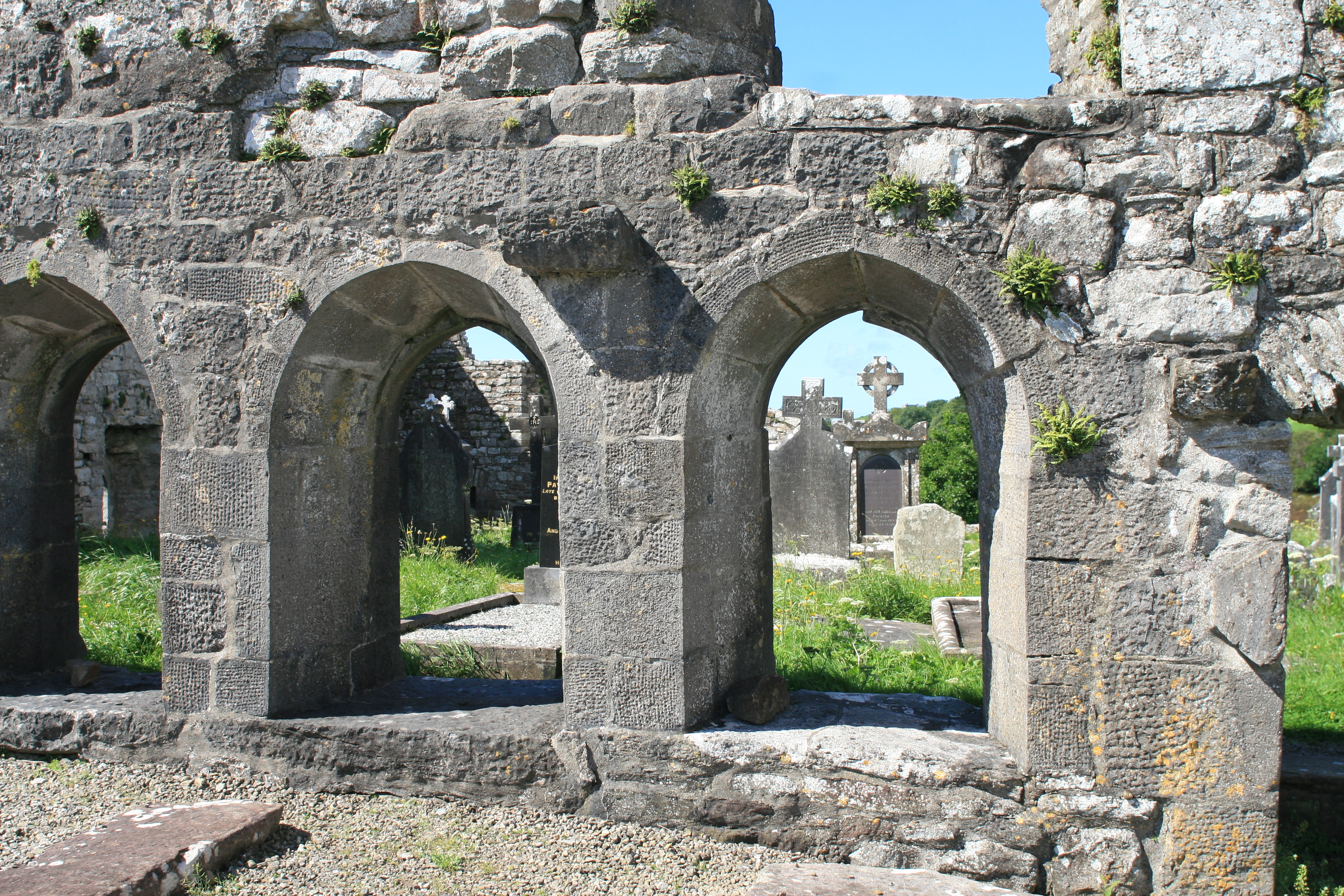
Cloister

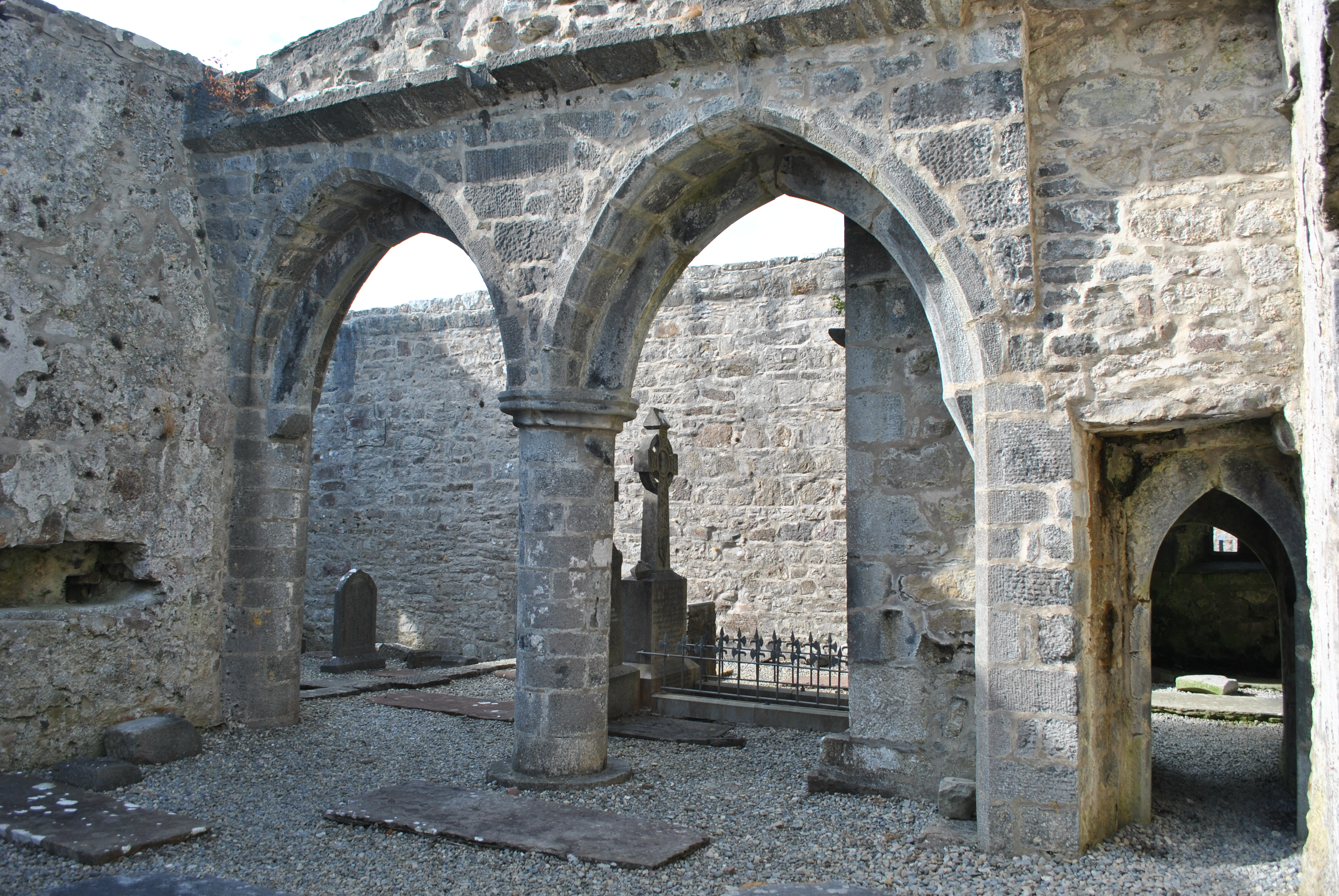
South transept and nave

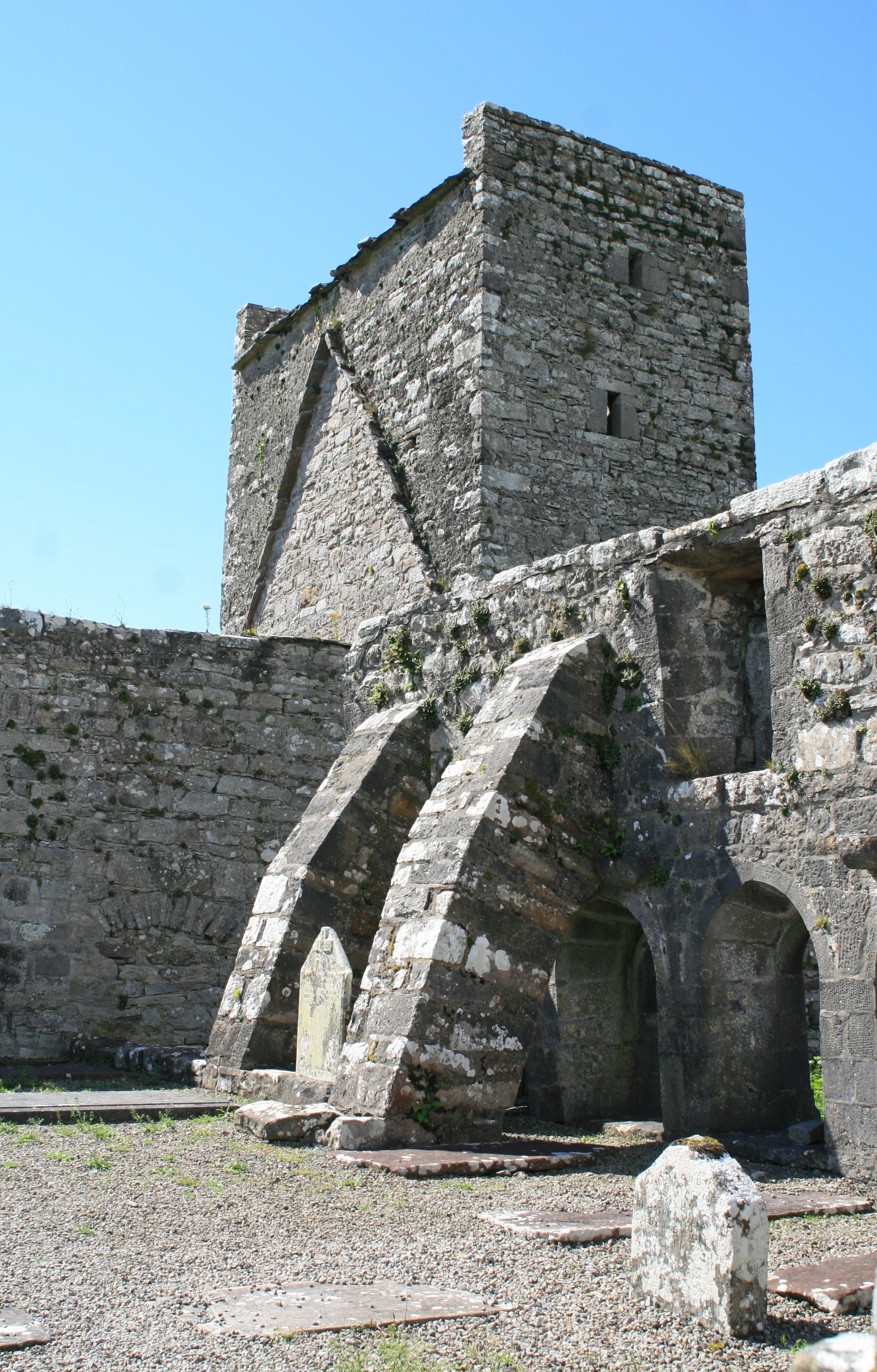
Tower

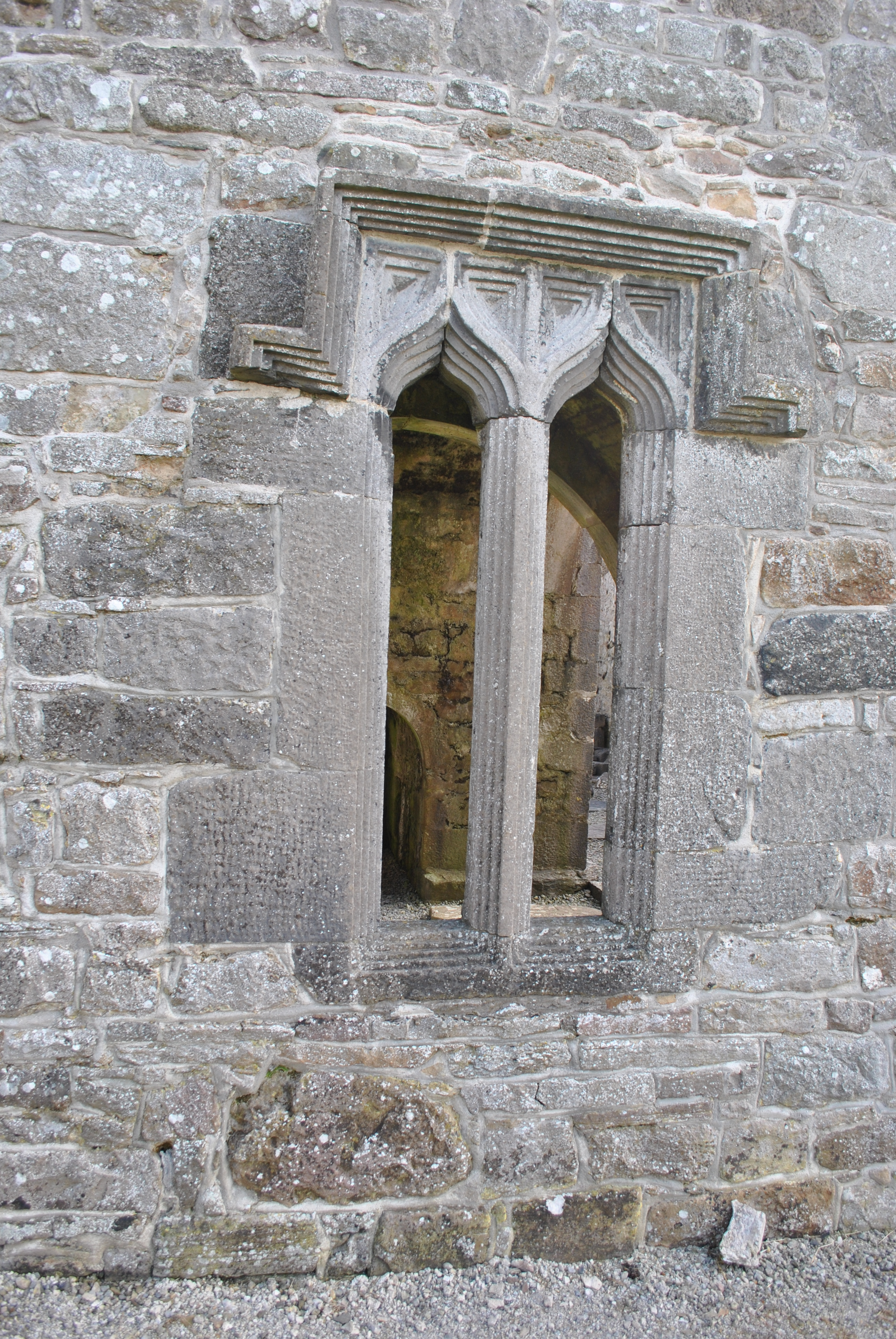

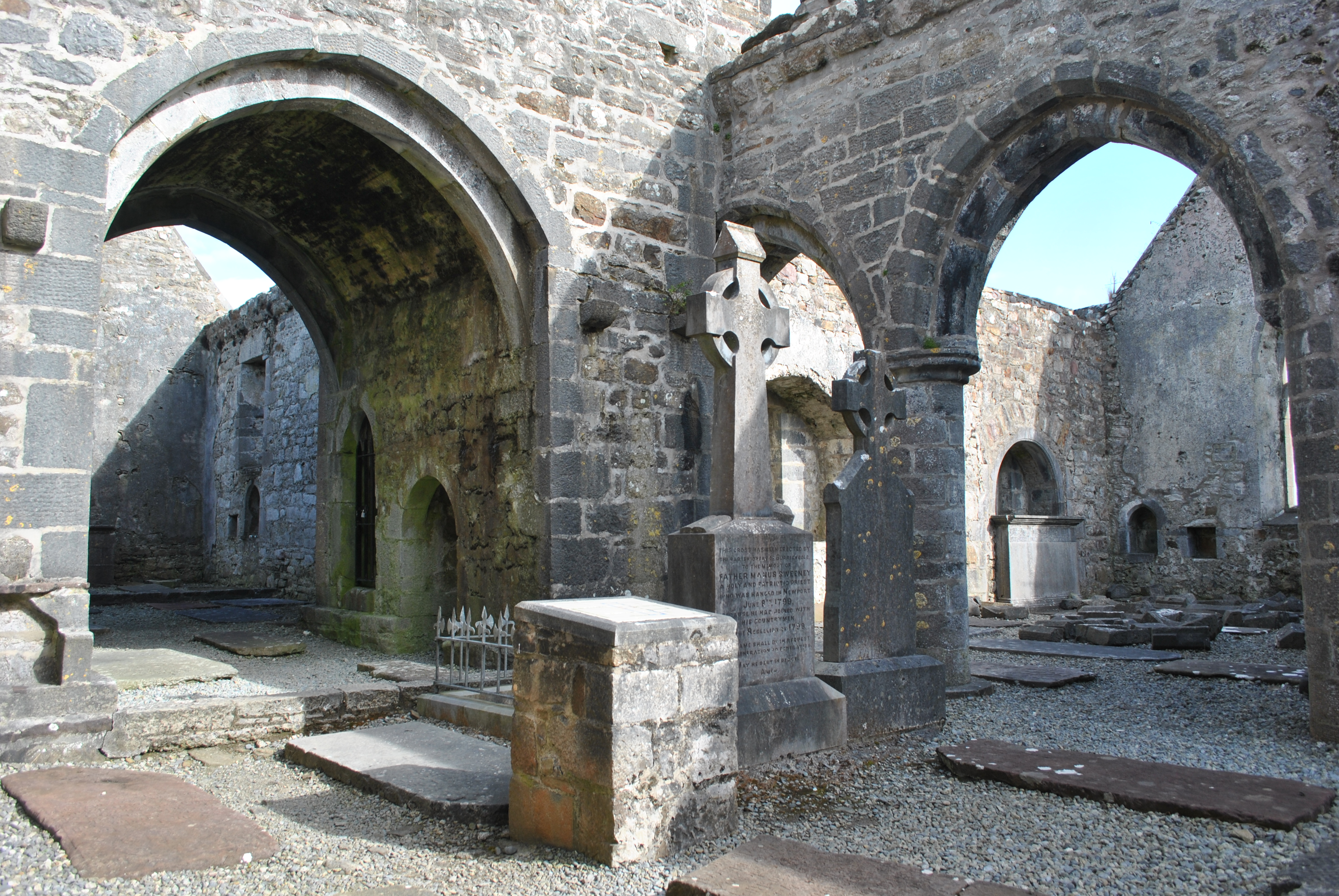

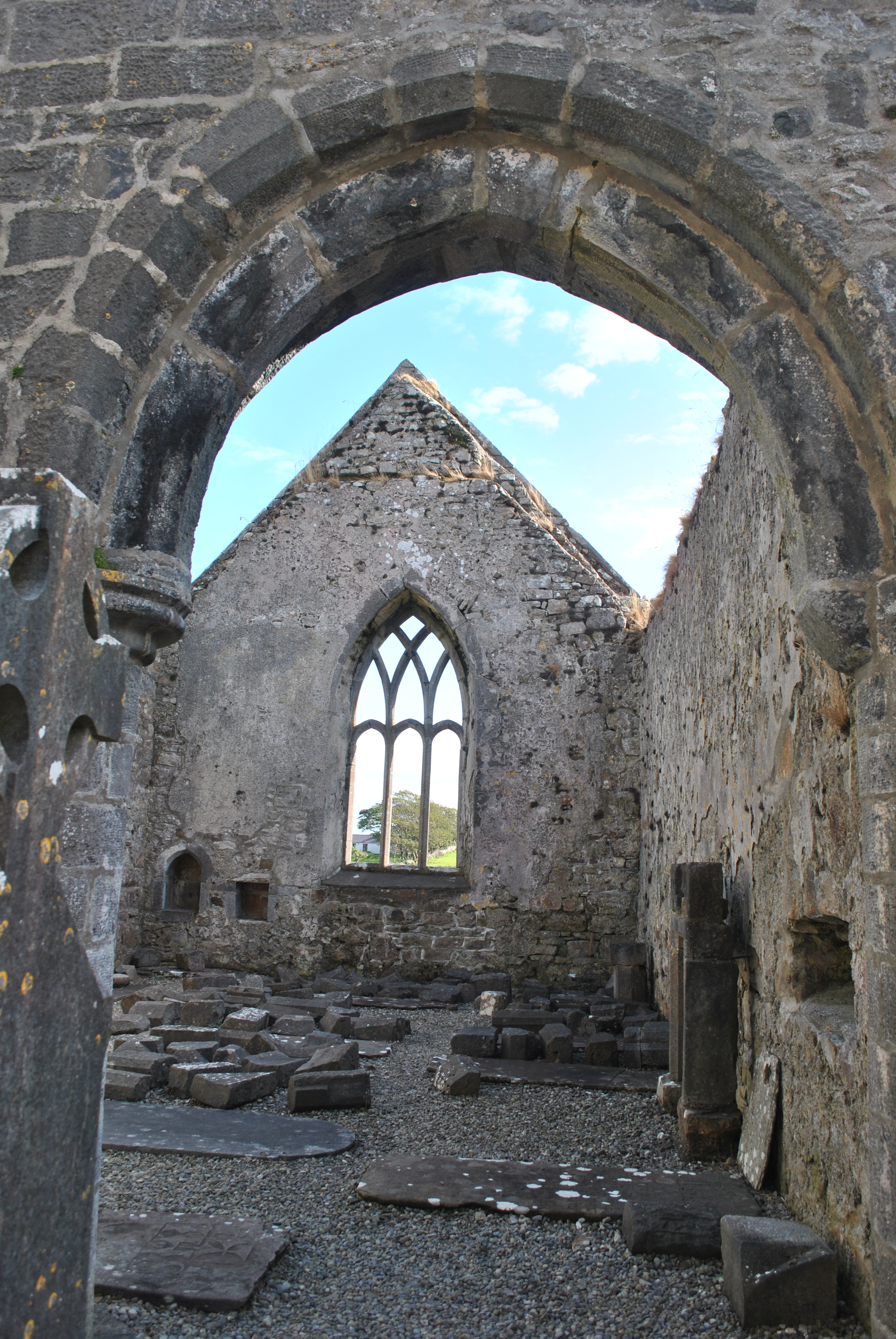

== See also ==
- Dominicans in Ireland
- List of abbeys and priories in Ireland (County Mayo)
- Images of Burrishoole friary
