= Breastagh Ogham Stone =

- Cloch Oghaim Bhréisteach (Irish)
- Breastagh Ogham Pillar
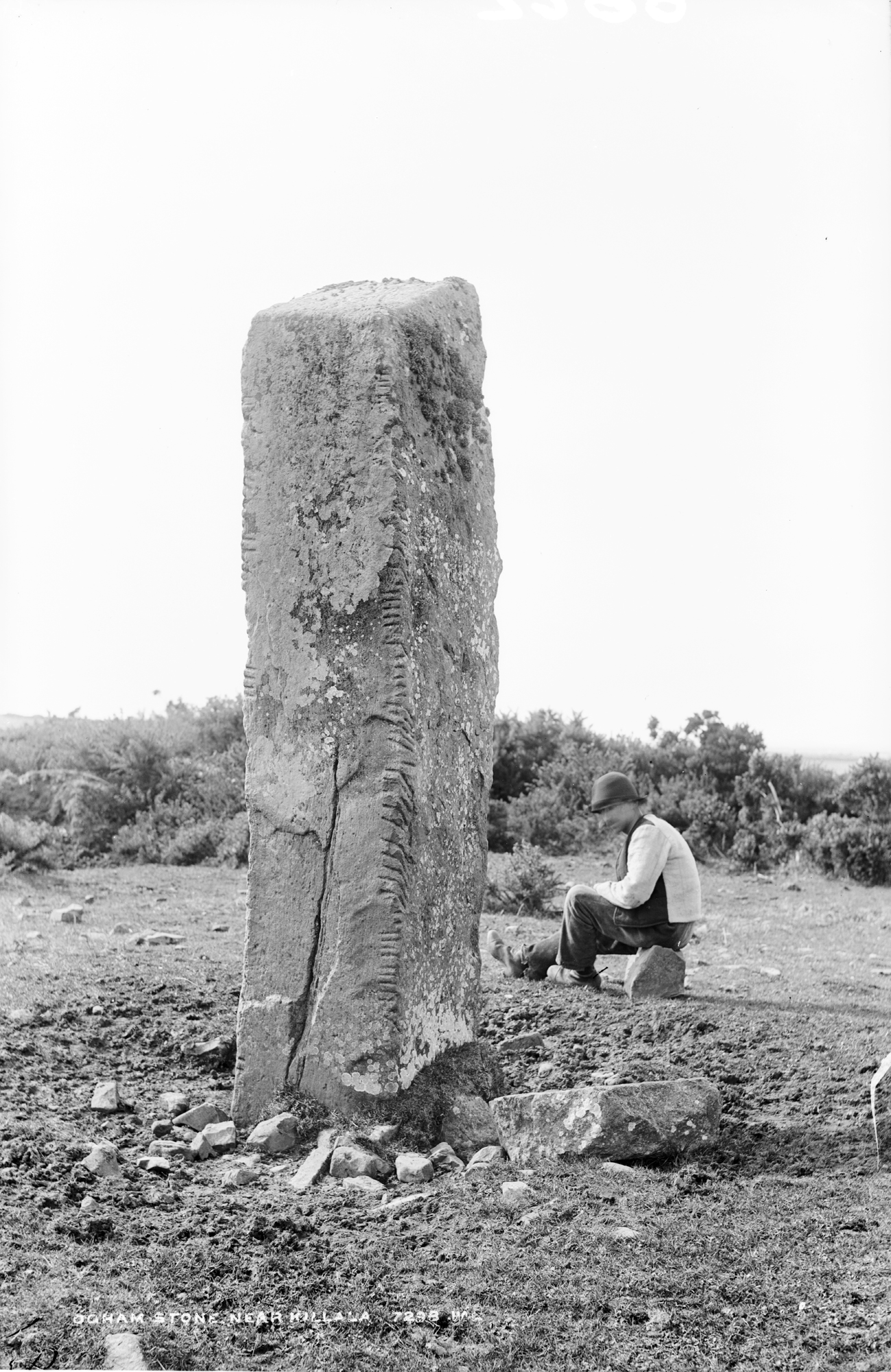

- Location within Ireland
- 54°14′47″N 9°15′13″W
- Type: Ogham stone
- Location: Breastagh, Killala, County Mayo, Ireland

History
- Built: AD 550–900

Site notes
- Elevation: 25 m (82 ft)
- Height: 3.66 m (12.0 ft)

National monument of Ireland
- Official name: Breastagh
- Reference no.: 415

Breastagh Ogham Stone (CIIC 010) is an ogham stone and National Monument located in County Mayo, Ireland.

== Location ==
Breastagh Ogham Stone stands in a field 4.2 km (2.6 mi) north-northwest of Killala town.

== History ==
The stone is believed to have been erected during the Bronze Age, and the carving added perhaps around AD 550–900.

The ogham stone was found lying in a field in April 1874 by an English tourist, W.K. Dover, and brought to the attention of Sir Samuel Ferguson, who had it re-erected.

== Description ==
Breastagh Ogham Stone is a pillar of stone measuring 366 × 76 × 60 cm and has Ogham carvings incised on two edges. ᚛ᚂᚓᚌᚌ[--]ᚄᚇ[--]ᚂᚓᚌᚓᚄᚉᚐᚇ᚜ / ᚛ᚋᚐᚊ ᚉᚑᚏᚏᚁᚏᚔ ᚋᚐᚊ ᚐᚋᚋᚂᚂᚑᚌᚔᚈᚈ᚜ (L[ ... ]G̣G̣[ ... ]SD[ ... ]LENGẸṢCẠ[D] / MAQ CORRBṚI MAQ AMMLLỌṆG̣[I]ṬT, "Legescad, son of Corrbrias, son of Ammllogitt") is carved on it. This is believed to refer to a grandson of Amalgaid mac Fiachrae (d. AD 440), King of Connacht of the Uí Fiachrach, who gives his name to the barony of Tirawley and earlier to the túath of (Tír Amhlaidh).
