= Straw Island Lighthouse =

Lighthouse in the Aran Islands, Ireland

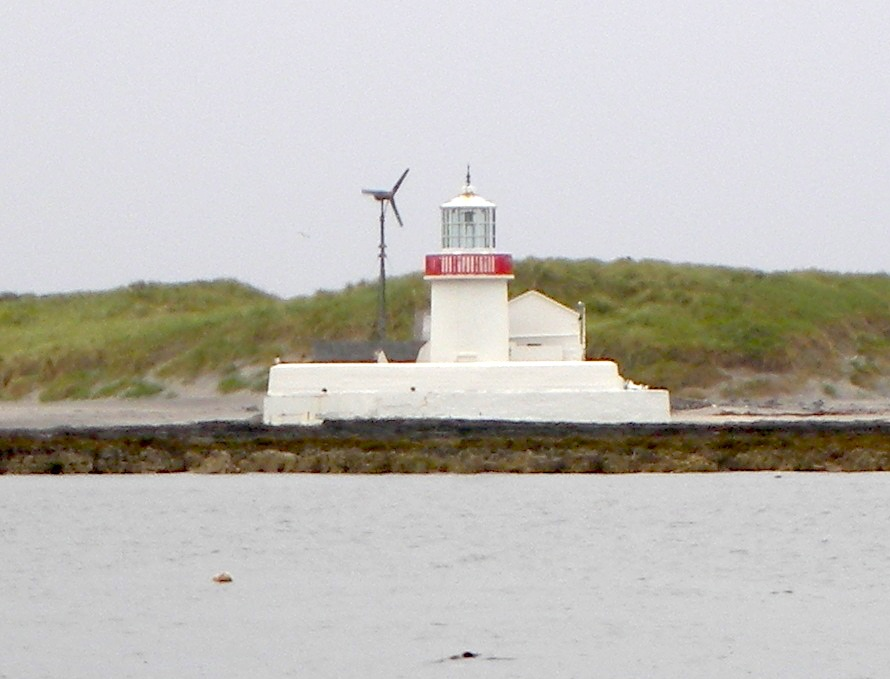
- Straw Island is one of four principal lighthouses in the Aran Islands
- Location: Aran Islands, Ireland
- Coordinates: 53.1179°N 9.6308°W

Tower
- Constructed: 1878
- Automated: 1926
- Height: 11 metres (36 ft)
- Operator: Commissioners of Irish Lights
- Heritage: National Inventory of Architectural Heritage

Light
- First lit: 1878
- Focal height: 11 metres (36 ft)
- Range: 15 nautical miles (28 km; 17 mi)
- Characteristic: Fl(2) W 5s

Straw Island Lighthouse is an active aid to navigation on an islet of the same name (Irish: Oileán an Tuí) in Killeany Bay, northeast of Inishmore in County Galway, Ireland. Completed in 1878, it was the last of four lighthouses built in the 19th century on the Aran Islands. The commissioning of Straw Island marked the culmination of a lengthy 24-year campaign by the local islanders to have a lighthouse for safe passage into Killeany Bay and the harbour at Kilronan.

== History ==
The first lighthouse on the Aran Islands was built in 1818 on Inishmore in the centre of the island near Dun Oghil, but it became apparent that it was poorly positioned. Firstly, because it could not be seen at the hazardous ends of the Aran Islands chain, where the North and South Sound approaches were located, and secondly, its location on the highest point of the island also meant it could be obscured in poor weather conditions. Requests from the Revenue Commissioners to the Ballast Board, the predecessor of the Commissioners of Irish Lights to relocate the light went unheeded.

But in 1850 the Galway Harbour Commissioners asked the Board to construct a new lighthouse at the north-west end of the islands. To meet this request, it was determined that the best approach was to construct two lighthouses, one on Eeragh and the other, the Inisheer Lighthouse, at the south-eastern end of the island chain.

Inishmore was deactivated in 1857, when Eeragh and Inisheer were first lit on the 1 December that year. Prior to its deactivation, there were representations by the islanders about the impact the loss of the light would have on safe passage into Killeany Bay and the harbour at Kilronan. Although these requests to replace the lighthouse were supported by the Ballast Board, the Board of Trade in London felt that such a light would only be of local use for the harbour, and the outlay should not come from the wider Mercantile Marine Fund. This dismissal of funding prompted a lengthy campaign by the islanders, and local landowners to overturn the decision.

Fishermen from Claddagh who would shelter in the bay, suggested a light on Straw Island. A letter from 1859 explained

The poor fishermen are in a pitiful state for want of a light on Straw Island, since they lost the other; they say it will be the cause of many lives lost. I and you well know the bad entrance into Killeany Bay in a dark night.

The issue was even raised in Houses of Parliament 1872 by the Galway MP Mitchell Henry, by which time the Board of Trade had finally relented and approved the siting of a new light on Straw Island. The decision followed a visit by the Inspecting Committee who suggested a pile light such as that at Spit Bank may be the answer, however a light on nearby Straw Island was deemed to be the most advantageous. But the project only moved ahead slowly, and it was not until 1878, that the lighthouse was finally commissioned.

== Operation ==
Built at a cost of £1,143. (equivalent to £129,901 as of 2023) the lighthouse included a white tower 10.6 metres (35 ft) high, with lantern and gallery. Adjacent was a keepers’ house, and outbuildings surrounded by a boundary wall. The original optic was a fifth-order lens by Edmundson and Co. of Dublin, lit with an oil lamp, providing a continuous red light. Various changes were made to the optics in 1905, and 1926 when a Chance Brothers system was installed that used acetylene gas. The light was electrified in 1980, with a wind turbine supplying power to a bank of batteries that drive a rotating Pharos PRB system. With a focal height of 11 metres (36 ft) above sea level, the light can be seen for 15 nautical miles, with a characteristic of two white flashes every five seconds.

== Keepers ==
In 1911 the Principal Keeper, Mr B.R. Jeffers, helped rescue the crew of the Hector which ran aground on the island in November that year. He was presented with "£2 and an inscribed pair of binoculars by the R.N.L.I. and £5 from the owners of the vessel." The keepers were withdrawn in 1926, when the acetylene system was installed in the sitting room of the house. In 1938 the remainder of the house was demolished.

The lighthouse was badly damaged when heavy seas overtopped the boundary walls during a storm in January 2014. The local attendant for the Commissioners of Irish Lights, Ronan Gill who lived on Inishmore confirmed that the light had failed by looking out across the bay. Parts of the building were destroyed and equipment carried away and ruined by the sea breaching the building. The light was inoperable for a number of days, until repairs were undertaken by engineers who flew in by helicopter.

== Listed buildings ==
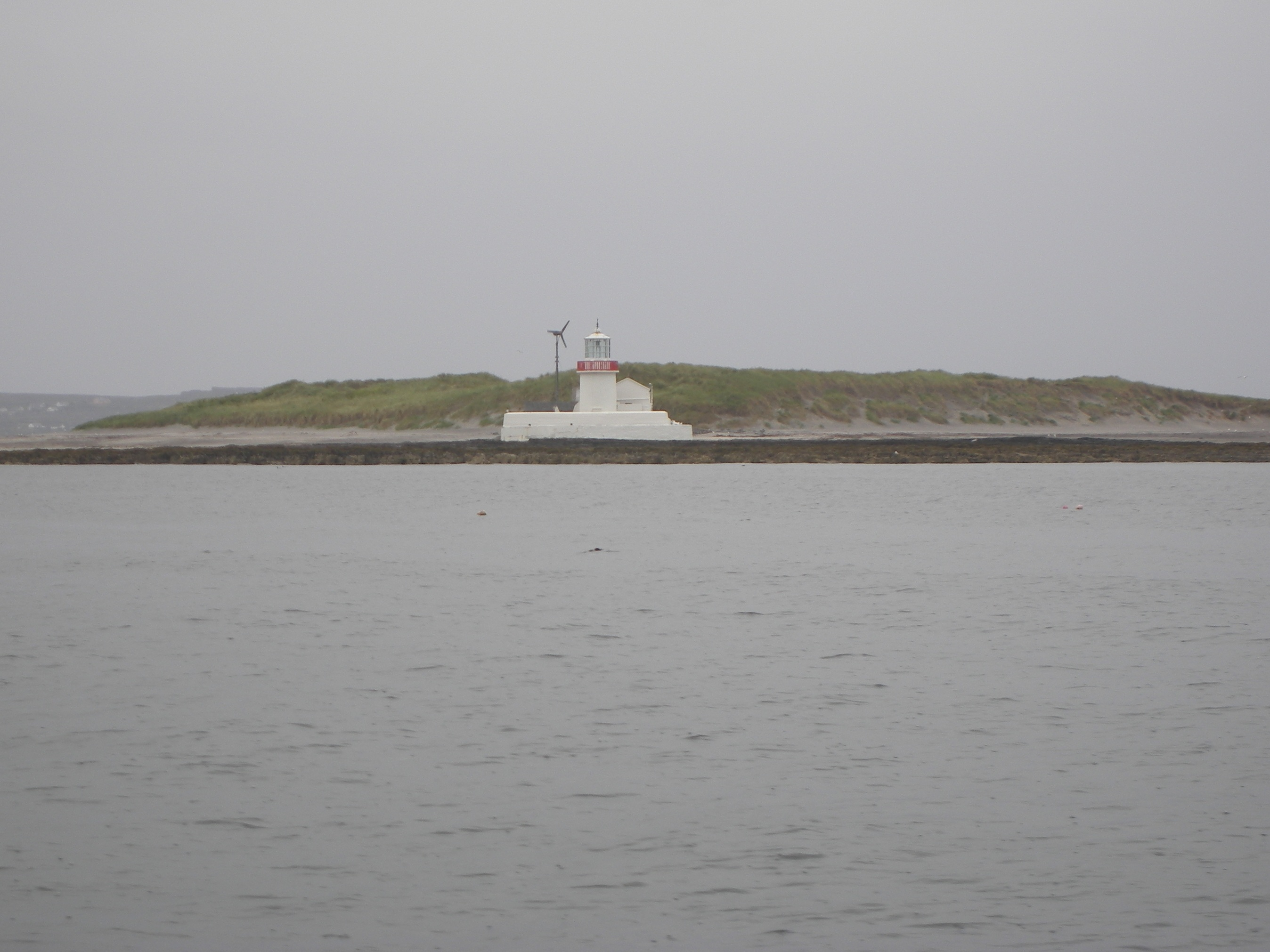
Straw Island and lighthouse

The lighthouse tower is listed within the National Inventory of Architectural Heritage, where it is noted that "Its distinctive squat appearance is unusual for lighthouses in the region and the contrasting colours of white rendered walls and red painted metalwork make it aesthetically pleasing."

== See also ==
- List of lighthouses in Ireland
