= Inishmore Lighthouse =

Decommissioned lighthouse in the Aran Islands, Ireland

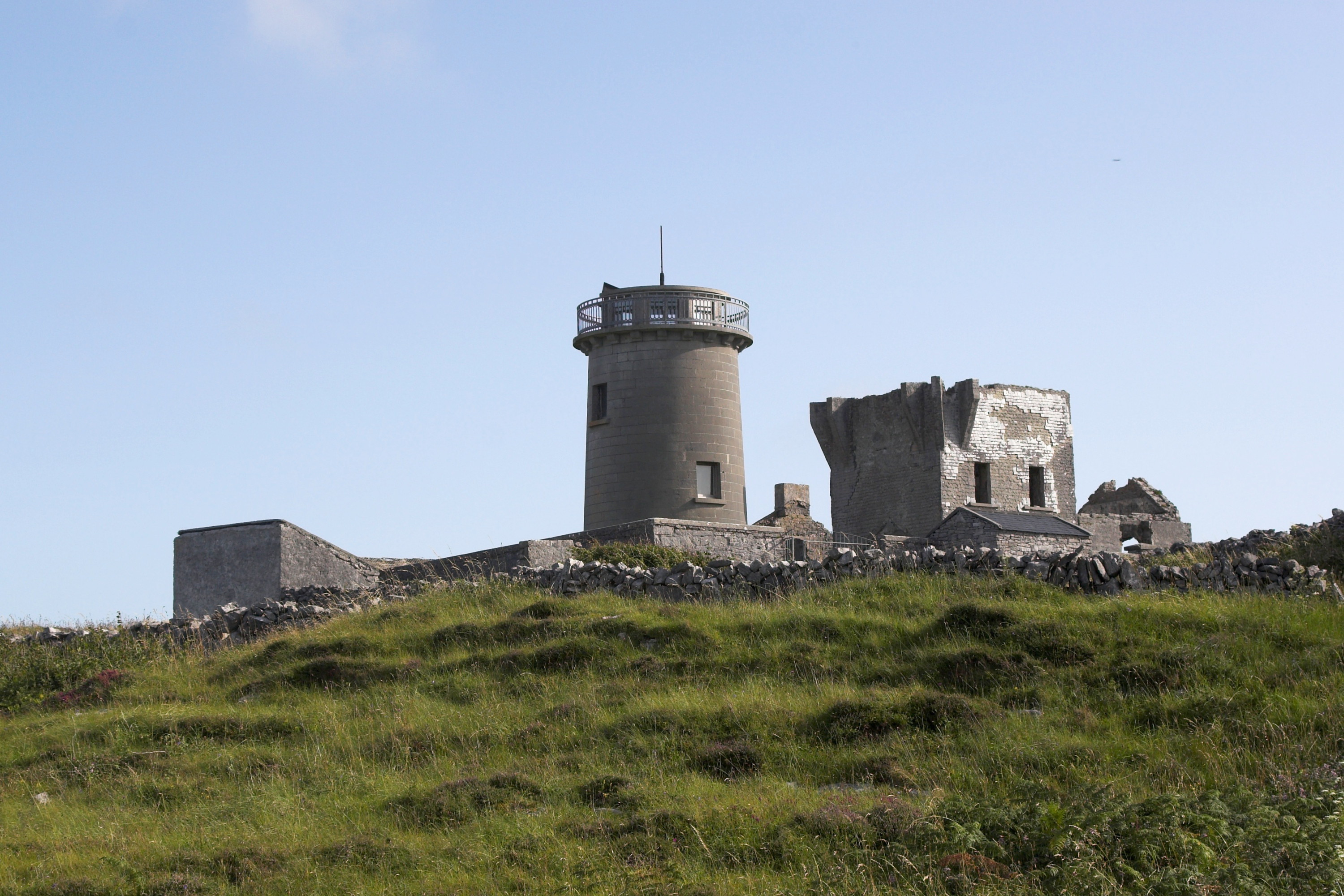
- Inishmore lighthouse in 2009. Three other lighthouses continue in use along the Aran Islands
- Location: Aran Islands, Ireland
- Coordinates: 53.1274°N 9.7022°W

Tower
- Constructed: 1818
- Heritage: National Inventory of Architectural Heritage

Light
- First lit: 1818
- Deactivated: 1857

The Inishmore or Dún Árann Lighthouse, is a decommissioned lighthouse located on the highest point of Inishmore, the largest of the Aran Islands in County Galway, Ireland. It was the first in a series of lighthouses built in the 19th century on the Aran Islands but was poorly positioned and eventually replaced by the Inisheer Lighthouse and the Eeragh Lighthouse. Its deactivation also led to the construction of another lighthouse on Straw Island.

== History ==
Inishmore was the first lighthouse built on the Aran Islands and was completed in 1818 in the centre of the island near Dun Oghil. Located on a hill 122m above sea level, it was designed to guide shipping past the island chain, but it became apparent that it was poorly positioned. Firstly, because it could not be seen at the hazardous ends of the Aran Islands chain, where the North and South Sound approaches were located, and secondly, its location on the highest point of the island also meant it could be obscured in poor weather conditions. Requests from the Revenue Commissioners to the Ballast Board, the predecessor of the Commissioners of Irish Lights to relocate the light went unheeded.

Evidence collected for the Port of Galway in 1845 by a Royal commission on Tidal Harbours, included that from Captain White of the Royal Navy, who complained that "The light at Arran is perched too high; it is 413 feet above the level of the sea. Captains of vessels often see the rocks before the light." Another Captain, James Price stated "that running in, in a gale of wind, the present light on Arran is no good, but ought to be placed on Brannagh Island". There were also concerns about the colour of the tower "The lighthouse is painted white, which, seen against the sky is the least distinct that could be adopted for hazy weather, or any weather, except when the sun shines bright".

In 1850 the Galway Harbour Commissioners asked the Board to construct a new lighthouse at the north-west end of the islands. To meet this request, it was determined that the best approach was to construct two lighthouses, one on Inisheer and the other, the Eeragh Lighthouse, on one of the Brannock Islands to the north-west of Inishmore. They were commissioned on 1 December 1857, the Inishmore light being deactivated that date.

Prior to its deactivation, there were representations by the islanders about the impact the loss of the light would have on safe passage into Killeany Bay and the harbour at Kilronan. It was not until 1878, after numerous requests for a new lighthouse were denied, that one was finally commissioned on nearby Straw Island.

== Operation ==
It had a rotating optic that gave it a flashing characteristic in order to differentiate it from Loop Head and Clare Island, which were both static lights. In his 1831 book, The British Pharos, Alan Stevenson noted that "This light revolves and is seen at the distance of five or six leagues, or at lesser distances in hazy weather, The light appears once in every three minutes in its brightest state, like a star of the first magnitude, and, gradually becoming less luminous, is eclipsed." This was achieved by having an "optic [that] had three faces each with seven oil lamps and catoptric reflectors which when revolved gave a 30 second flash every three minutes.". Although no longer an aid to navigation, the tower is still clearly visible to mariners and mentioned in a description of sailing directions for the West coast of Ireland.

== Listed buildings ==
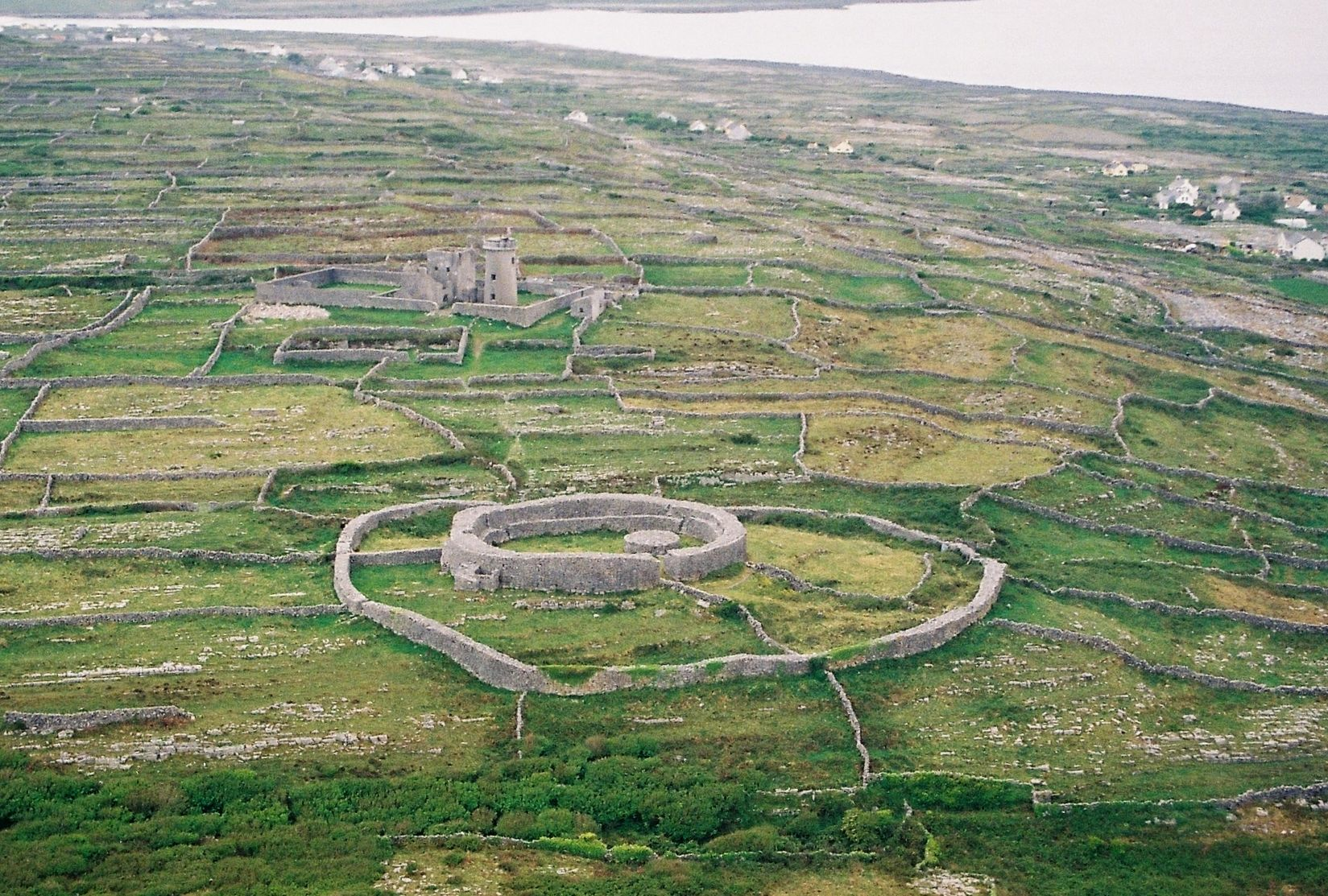
Aerial view of the ring fort and lighthouse in the middle distance

The lighthouse tower is listed within the National Inventory of Architectural Heritage, where it is noted "Unusually sited inland, this lighthouse dominates views in the middle of Árainn".

== Access ==
Positioned at the mid-point of the island, the tower is located next to a Napoleonic era signal tower with the Ring fort of Dún Eochla nearby. Visitors have found the compound and tower open.

== See also ==
- List of lighthouses in Ireland
