= Margaret Anna Cusack =

Irish nun and religious sister

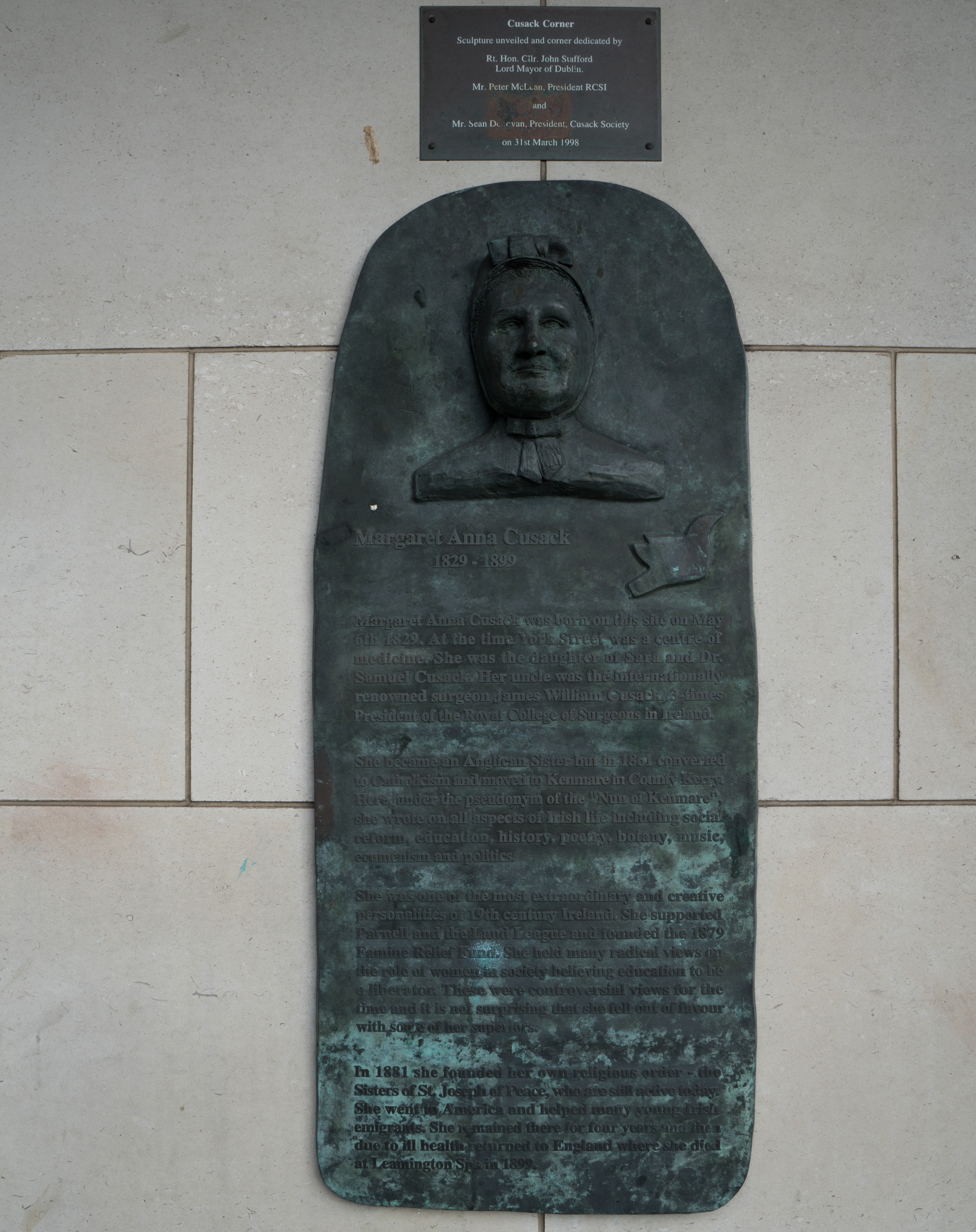
- Memorial to Margret Anna Cusack in Dublin
- Born: 6 May 1829; Mercer Street/York Street, Dublin, Ireland
- Died: 5 June 1899 (aged 70); Leamington Spa, England, UK
- Other names: Sister Mary Francis Cusack; Mother Margaret
- Occupation: Foundress of Sisters of St. Joseph of Peace religious congregation

Margaret Anna Cusack (in religion Mary Francis Clare Cusack; 6 May 1829 – 5 June 1899), also known as Mother Margaret and the Nun of Kenmare, was a former Irish Catholic nun who founded the Sisters of St. Joseph of Peace before returning to Anglicanism (the faith of her youth). She lived in Ireland, England, and the United States.

By 1870 more than 200,000 copies of her works which ranged from biographies of saints to pamphlets on social issues had circulated throughout the world, the proceeds from which went towards victims of the Famine of 1879 and helping to feed the poor. An independent and controversial figure, Cusack was a passionate Irish nationalist, often at odds with the ecclesiastical hierarchy.

== Early life ==
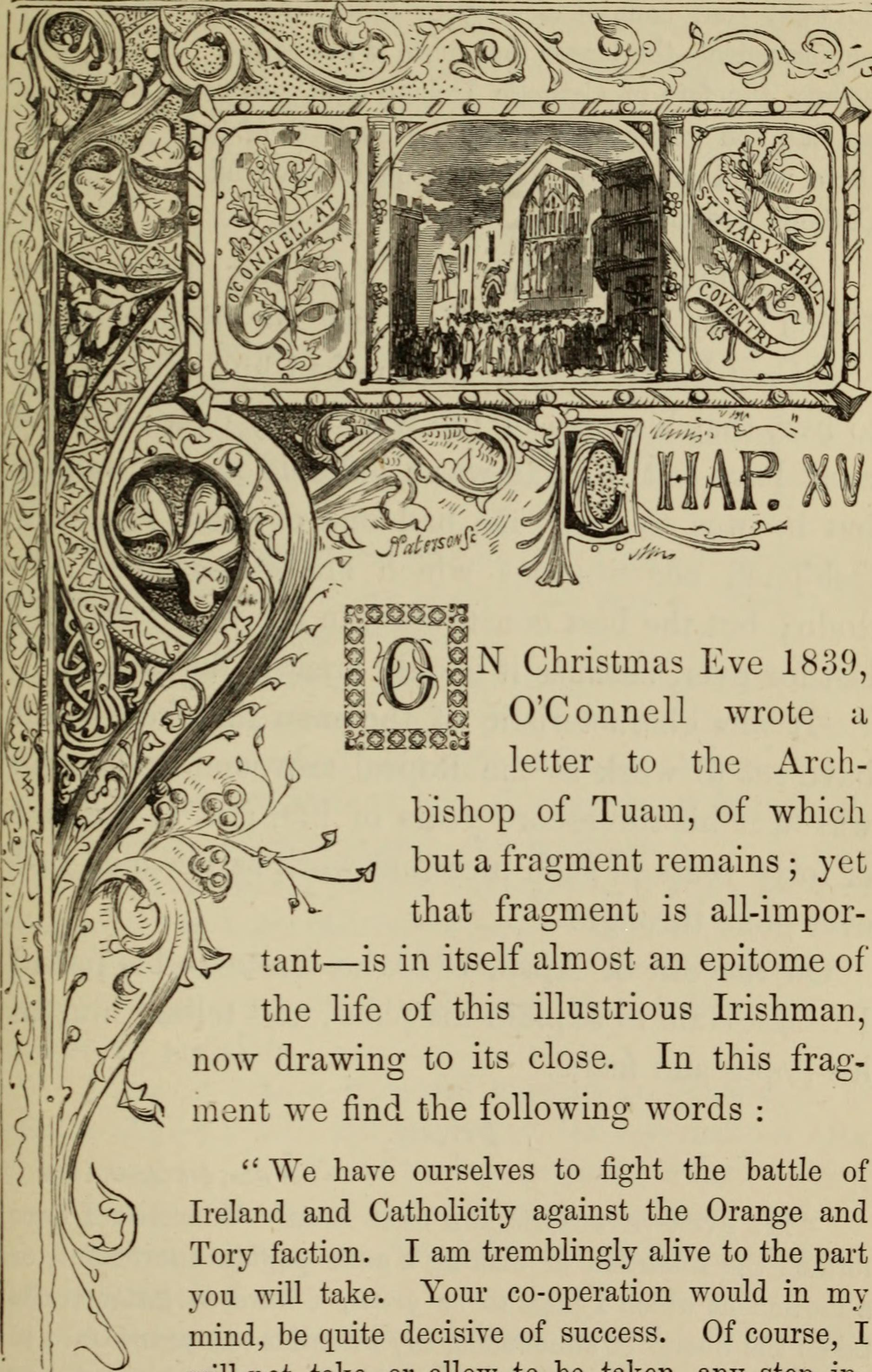
Page from The Liberator: His Life and Times, Political, Social, and Religious on Daniel O'Connell

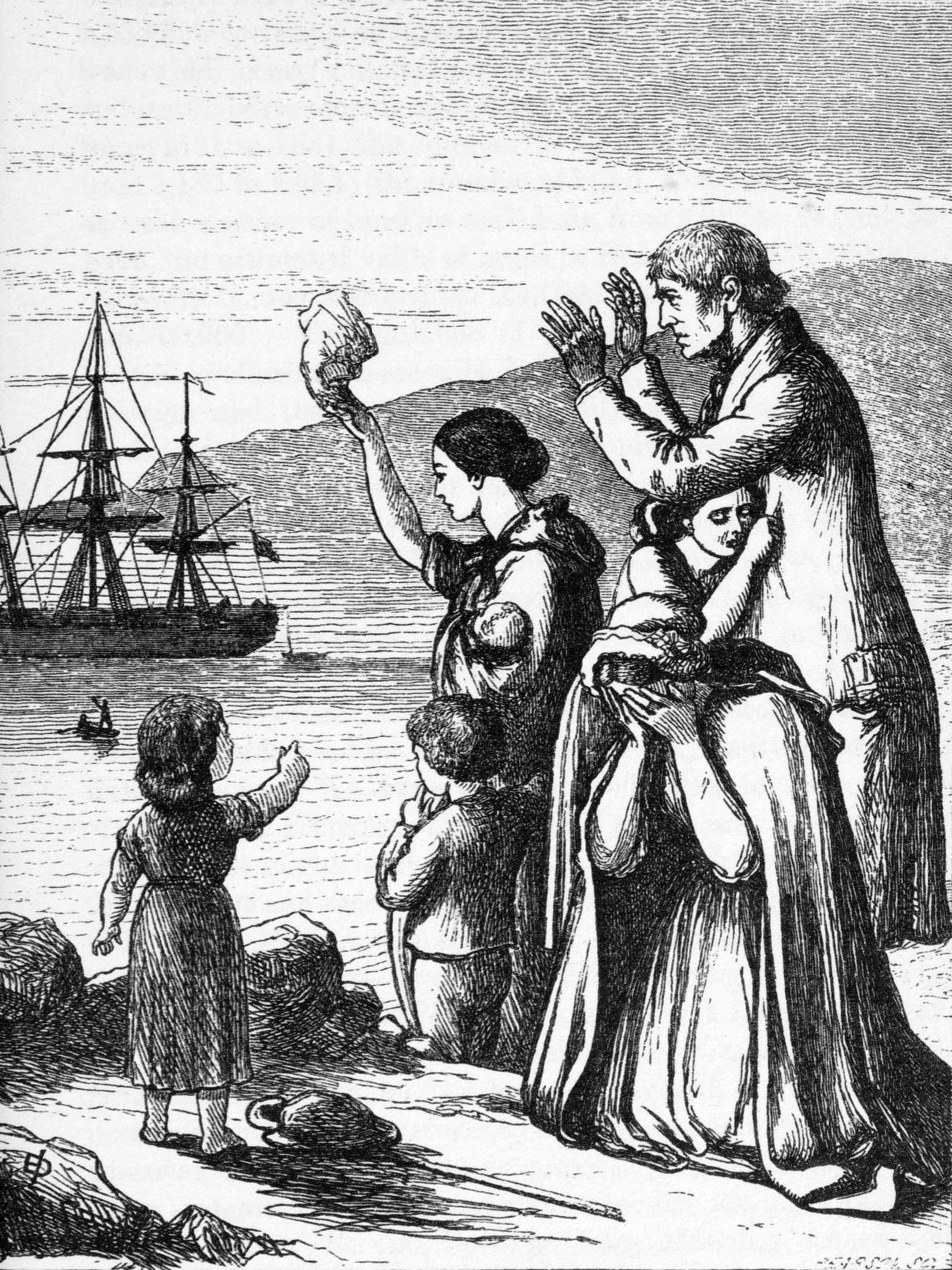
Emigrants Leave Ireland, engraving by Henry Doyle (1827–1893), from Mary Frances Cusack's An Illustrated History of Ireland from AD 400 to 1800, 1868.

Margaret Anna Cusack was born in Coolock, County Dublin into a family of Church of Ireland gentry. Her parents were Samuel and Sara Stoney Cusack. Her father was a physician. When she was a teenager, her parents separated, and she, her mother, and brother Samuel went to live with her grand-aunt in Exeter, Devon, where Margaret attended boarding school.

== "Nun of Kenmare" ==
Influenced by the Oxford Movement, and motivated by the sudden death of her fiancé, Charles Holmes, in 1852 she joined a convent of Puseyite Anglican nuns. However, disappointed at not being sent to the Crimean War, in 1858 she converted to Catholicism and joined the Poor Clares in Newry, County Down, a community of Franciscan nuns that taught poor girls. She took the name of Sister Francis Clare. In 1861 she was sent with a small group of nuns, led by Mary O'Hagan to Kenmare, County Kerry, then one of the most destitute parts of Ireland, to establish a convent of Poor Clares.

She wrote 35 books, including many popular pious and sentimental texts on private devotions (A Nun's Advice to her Girls), poems, Irish history and biography, founding Kenmare Publications, through which 200,000 volumes of her works were issued in less than ten years. She kept two full-time secretaries for correspondence and wrote letters on Irish causes in the Irish, United States, and Canadian press.

In the famine year of 1871, she raised and distributed £15,000 in a famine relief fund. She publicly railed against landlords of the region, particularly Lord Lansdowne, who owned the lands around Kenmare, and his local agent. She was an outspoken Irish nationalist, publishing The Patriot's History of Ireland, in 1869, though she later denied being associated with the Ladies' Land League. In 1872 she issued an account of the life of Daniel O'Connell, The Liberator: His Life and Times, Political, Social, and Religious. After receiving death threats upon publication of her book on the abuse of tenants on the Landsdowne and Kenmare estates in Kerry, she "effectively absconded from her [Kenmare] convent on a supposed visit to Knock on 16 Nov. 1881."

== Knock ==
Her transfer orders were for her to return to Newry, but she moved to Mayo where she was determined to erect a convent at Knock. Cusack has been described as "a temperamental extremist", "eccentric and rebellious", "passionate and difficult, constantly at odds with her ecclesiastical superiors", who was "an early and fervent believer in the apparition of the Virgin Mary at Knock". Younger contemporaries of hers in the convent remembered her as "furious when disturbed and capable of making physical attacks", such as tugging off their veils.

In 1880 she published the pamphlet The Apparition at Knock; with the depositions of the witness[es] examined by the Ecclesiastical Commission appointed by His Grace the Archbishop of Tuam and the conversion of a young Protestant lady by a vision of the Blessed Virgin.

In 1936 Archbishop Thomas Gilmartin of Tuam established a second Commission of Enquiry. As most of the documents from the early years at Knock were assumed to have been lost, the commission was forced to rely upon press reports and devotional works printed in the 1880s, which portrayed the developing cult in a positive light, and interviews with Patrick Byrne and Mary Byrne O'Connell, the last surviving witnesses. A special tribunal was set by the Cardinal Hayes, Archbishop of New York, to examine John Curry who was residing there.

In 1995, while doing research in Washington, among the papers of Cusack, John J. White, came upon a large box marked 'pre-foundation papers'. "The box contained the original, unedited depositions of several of the 21 August 1879 witnesses, the original manuscript of the parish priest's account of cures, depositions and statements taken from witnesses in 1880, and hundreds of other documents and letters from people seeking or claiming cures through the intercession of Our Lady of Knock.".

While there are many local shrines throughout Ireland, Cusack joined Canon Ulick Bourke and Timothy Daniel Sullivan in promoting Knock as a national Marian pilgrimage site. According to John J. White, professor of history at Dayton University, the Knock pilgrimages and the Land League developed simultaneously along parallel lines. Both involved many of the same individuals and used similar methods of popularization and promotion. "The Cusack papers show how many figures from moderate nationalists to Land Leaguers and Fenians were actively involved with Knock." Although Cusack was widely seen as associated with the Land League, she herself claimed that she was not, and did not entirely approve of the movement.

== Sisters of St. Joseph of Peace ==
After she claimed the Virgin had spoken to her, and she seemed to become difficult to deal with, problems arose with the local priest and archbishop. Cusack planned to establish a training school for young women intending to emigrate so that they would have some job skills when they reached America. The Archbishop of Tuam's feelings on the matter were somewhat ambiguous. While he supported a training school for young women, he did not wish to encourage emigration, "There is plenty of room to spare for all our people at home, if things were well managed..." Nonetheless, as she pointed out that people would emigrate anyway, he agreed to support the plan.

Archbishop McEvilly granted permission for her to establish a convent at Knock. However, the archbishop wanted her to establish a community of Poor Clares whilst she intended to found an entirely new community called the Sisters of St. Joseph of Peace. Cusack believed that the Poor Clare's had been brought to Kenmare instead of the Presentation Sisters for political reasons, a claim biographer Philomena McCarthy disproved and attributed to a disturbed mind. Cusack grew impatient with the Archbishop's failure to heed her advice and considered him an obstructionist. She left Knock in 1883 taking most of the records regarding the apparitions, as well as the funds pledged for the building of a new convent, the latter causing something of an international scandal. She left the Kenmare Poor Clares and went to England.

In 1884, during an audience with Pope Leo XIII to seek his support, Cusack obtained permission for a dispensation to leave the order of the Poor Clares and found a new congregation, the Sisters of St. Joseph of Peace, intended for the establishment and care of homes for friendless girls, where domestic service would be taught and moral habits inculcated.

She opened the first house of the new order in Nottingham, England and in 1885, a similar house in Jersey City, New Jersey, the first foundation of the Sisters of St Joseph of Peace in the United States. She opened a hostel for Irish immigrant girls in Englewood Cliffs, New Jersey. The earnings of her most notable writings – Lives of Irish Saints and Illustrated History of Ireland supported her convent. As of 2014 the congregation she founded had communities in Great Britain, Canada, Haiti, Ireland and the USA.

== Departure from the Catholic Church ==
In Newark, she once again came into controversy with the local Catholic hierarchy, this time regarding among other things, funding, and her public support of a suspended priest. She wrote a 176-page pamphlet entitled, The Question of Today: Anti-Poverty and Progress, Labor and Capital. In it, she defended Fr Edward McGlynn, a vocal supporter of the political and economic views of Henry George, which some considered to border on socialism.

Archbishop Michael Corrigan of New York viewed Cusack's pamphlet as an attack on the authority of the Church and demanded an apology. She attempted to halt its publication, but was unsuccessful. Her involvement in a New York City political campaign also generated a good deal of controversy. Cusack resigned as head of her order in 1888 and placed a loyal friend Honoria Gaffney as the new leader, confirmed by a later election.

Cusack returned to the Anglican Communion and issued The Nun of Kenmare: An Autobiography, also in 1888. Afterwards she lectured and wrote a number of anti-Catholic books: The Black Pope: History of the Jesuits, What Rome Teaches (1892) and Revolution and War, the secret conspiracy of the Jesuits in Great Britain (published posthumously, 1910).

== Death and legacy ==
Cusack died on 5 June 1899, aged 70, and was buried in a Church of England-reserved burial site at Leamington Spa, Warwickshire, England.

Cusack passed into obscurity for a long time, until as a result of Vatican II, religious orders were encouraged to review their roots and the intent of their founders. Since then there have been a number of studies on Cusack, such as Sister Philomena McCarthy's The Nun of Kenmare: The True Facts. With the rediscovery of the life and times of Cusack, she has been hailed as a feminist or not, and a social reformer ahead of her times.

== Writings ==
In 1868, Cusack's An Illustrated History of Ireland was published with illustrations by Henry Doyle, where, in a lengthy preface, she writes:

I believe there are honest and honorable men in England, who would stand aghast with horror if they thoroughly understood the injustices to which Ireland has been and still is subject. ...I believe the majority of Englishmen have not the faintest idea of the way in which the Irish tenant is oppressed, not by individuals, for there are many landlords in Ireland devoted to their tenantry, but by a system.

Her novels include Ned Rusheen, or, Who Fired the First Shot? (1871); and Tim O'Halloran's Choice (1877). In 1872 she wrote Honehurst Rectory, ridiculing Dr. Pusey and the other founders of the Puseyite order. That year the entire edition of her Life of St. Patrick burned in a fire at her publishing office.

She issued Advice to Irish Girls in America (1872), which deals mainly with tips and suggestions relating to the profession of domestic service. Cusack shared the prevailing views at that time regarding women's capabilities both physically and intellectually. In 1874 she wrote Women's Work in Modern Society, in which she exhorted women that their main influence was exercised as good Christian mothers. She both recognized and supported the class distinctions of her day.

Norman Vance sees Cusack as bridging the gap "...between eighteenth-century Catholic antiquarianism and the cultural nationalism of the Literary Revival." He describes her 1877 A History of the Irish Nation as "...strange but impressively learned and detailed". In 1878 The Trias Thaumaturga; or, Three Wonder-Working Saints of Ireland appeared, telling the lives of saints Patrick, Columba and Brigit.

She issued Cloister Songs and Hymns for Children in 1881, and wrote verse. She published more than fifty works, chief among which are A Student's History of Ireland; Lives of Daniel O'Connell, St. Patrick, St. Columba, and St. Bridget; The Pilgrim's Way to Heaven; Jesus and Jerusalem; and The Book of the Blessed Ones. Her two autobiographies are The Nun of Kenmare (1888) and The Story of My Life (1893).
