= Honoria Gaffney =

Irish missionary nun (1853–1920)

Honoria Gaffney CSJP
- Sister Mary Evangelista
- Born: 1 May 1853; Kilronan, Ireland
- Died: 21 July 1920 (aged 67); England
- Other name: Sister Mary Evangelista
- Occupation: nun
- Known for: Mother General of the sisters of St Joseph of Peace
- Predecessor: Margaret Anna Cusack

Honoria Gaffney, CSJP (in religion Mary Evangelista; 1 May 1853 – 21 July 1920) was an Irish Catholic missionary nun who became superior general of the Sisters of St. Joseph of Peace.

== Life ==
Gaffney was born in Kilronan on the Aran Islands in May 1853. Her father was a cobbler although the family also farmed eleven acres. Her parents Patrick and Mary Quinn had nine other children. She went to school locally and she became a pupil-teacher. She had a religious ambition, but she stayed and cared for her mother who died 1879.

In 1879, Mary McCloughlin and Mary Byrne said they saw an apparition of the Virgin Mary, Joseph and St John on the wall of the church in Knock. Fifteen people also saw it but Archdeacon Bartholomew Cavanagh who was nearby refused to go and see it. The apparition became famous. In 1881 Gaffney arrived in the parish of Knock to teach at Rooskey school. The head of the school was her aunt. She and Cavanagh worked to increase the provision of school places in Knock. It was Cavanagh who persuaded her to join a new community in Knock started by Margaret Cusack aka "Nun of Kenmare". She was the second recruit. In 1883 she also became the headteacher of the main school in Knock. Cusack's new community was meant to be a poor clare community but Cusack had plans to create a new one. She fell out with her supporters including Cavanagh and the new convent's construction was abandoned in November 1884.

Pope Leo XIII gave his approval to the Congregation of the Sisters of St. Joseph of Peace in 1884. It had been led by Margaret Anna Cusack and Gaffney was one of her supporters.

Cusack went to America and there she came into conflict with an American Bishop. She decided to leave the community and she rejoined the Church of England. Cusack left Gaffney in charge when she left the religious order. The remaining sisters did not disband or join another community but they decided to continue with the support of Bishop Bagshawe.

She became first Mother General of the sisters of St Joseph of Peace in 1888 when she was elected by the community.

Gaffney died in England in 1920.
