= Island Ferries Teoranta v Minister for Communications =

Irish Supreme Court case

- Coat of arms of Ireland
- Court: Supreme Court of Ireland
- Full case name: Island Ferries Teoranta v Minister for Communications, Marine and Natural Resources & Ors
- Decided: 15th of December 2015
- Citation: [2015] IESC 95
- Transcript: https://www.bailii.org/ie/cases/IESC/2015/S95.html

Case history
- Appealed from: High Court
- Appealed to: Supreme Court

Court membership
- Judges sitting: Denham C.J., O'Donnell Donal J., McKechnie J., Dunne J., Charleton J.

Case opinions
- The Supreme Court held that the determination of whether or not there has been an abuse of a dominant position is fact-specific and is based on an analysis of all relevant factors.

Keywords
- Appeal; Irish Supreme Court; EU Competition Law

Island Ferries Teoranta v Minister for Communications [2015] IESC 95; [2015] 3 IR 637, is an Irish Supreme Court case concerned an appeal brought by the Minister against a High Court decision which found that he had acted ultra vires when imposing a per capita passenger charge on ferry services to the Aran Islands. The respondent was a company who owned and operated vessels used for passenger services; they challenged the per capita charges imposed by the Minister pursuant to the Fishery Harbour Centres Acts 1968-1980 and the Fishery Harbour Centres (Rates and Charges) Order 2003. The company also challenged the legality of the 2003 Order and refused to pay the charges imposed on the basis that it was outside of the Minister's powers. In the High Court, it was successfully argued that the Minister acted unlawfully in imposing charges contrary to the Competition Act 2002 and alternatively, that the order and provisions of the Fishery Harbour Centres Act 1968 were unconstitutional.

The Minister appealed this decision to the Supreme Court, where it was decided that the 2003 Order was ultra vires and could not have been enacted pursuant to section 4(2)(b) of the 1968 Act, which provided that the Minister could "by order, fix rates, tolls and other charges for the use of facilities", as it had a drastic and unreasonably harsh impact on the plaintiff company especially. It imposed an immediate and severe increase in operating costs, to the detriment of the plaintiff.

== Background ==
The first instance included Island Ferries Teoranta, which operated a ferry service between Rossaveel Harbour in Galway Bay and the Aran Islands. The Fishery Harbour Centres Acts 1968–1980, had fees put in place by the Minister. They have to be paid for at the harbour by Island Ferries. The minister subsequently tried to enact new fees by order in 2004. Island Ferries subsequently challenged the validity of the decision and accompanying fees and refused to pay the additional sums. At the pre-2004 rate, they kept paying the fees. The Minister asserted unpaid harbour fees in 2005 amounting to €201,476.74.The agency then withdrew passenger vessel licences for two of the boats operated by the ferry operator because the company failed to pay. Additionally, the harbour master temporarily detained one of their vessels. Island Ferries put up a bond of €200,000 after talks to ensure the vessel's release.

It was acknowledged that Galway City Council and the Minister both held dominant positions in the relevant market. They both said that the fees that they set for the use of the two harbours fell within the broad appreciation that the Oireachtas must be assumed to have taken into account when granting each charge for these maritime services and when permitting the setting of fees. The abuse of a dominant position by either respondent in the relevant market is denied by both parties.

The ferries service then made an application to the High Court to contest the validity of the fees and seek compensation for the losses it said were caused by the detention of its vessel.The business argued that the charges were unjustified, unfair, and not based on actual costs and that the payment demand violated EU competition law (section 5 of the Competition Act of 2002). The additional prices proposed by the Minister violated the 1968 Act, according to the High Court, which awarded the ferry service €92,243 in compensatory damages. The Minister submitted an appeal of the ruling to the Supreme Court.

== Holding of the Supreme Court ==
Whether Galway County Council constituted an enterprise using a dominant position in the provision of harbour services on the Aran Islands was a question that the Supreme Court had to resolve. According to Mr. Justice Charleton, it is not illegal under the Competition Act of 2002 to use a dominant position. Exploiting customers through monopolistic pricing or other unfair business practices is prohibited. The artificial suppression of competition by unfair means can be a part of this abuse of a dominant position. Based on the case's circumstances, the court concluded that the council had not abused its position of dominance. The court also cited the following information from the EU case Europemballage Corporation and Continental Can Company v Commission: "It is the effect of the conduct alleged to constitute abuse on the market that indicates whether such abuse has taken place."

The Supreme Court held that the determination of whether or not there has been an abuse of a dominant position is fact-specific and is based on an analysis of all relevant factors. In response to the High Court's decision favouring the ferries, the Supreme Court held that the trial judge's judgment of evident unfairness was supported by the rise in the level of charge that ferry owners must pay. The judge's factual and legal conclusions in this case should be upheld. The Supreme Court held that Galway County Council had not abused its position of dominance and that the trial judge's judgement of evident unfairness was supported by the rise in the level of charge that ferry owners must pay. The court concluded that none of these appeals could succeed on any of their grounds.

The court came to the conclusion that none of these appeals could succeed on any of their grounds and thus dismissed the appeal.

== See also ==
- EU competition law
- Galway City Council
- Damages
- Irish Supreme Court
