= Carrownlisheen Wedge Tomb =

Irish national monument

Carrownlisheen Wedge Tomb - Leaba Dhiarmada 'is Gráinne
- Tuama Dingeach Cheathrú an Lisín (Irish)
- Diarmuid and Gráinne's Bed
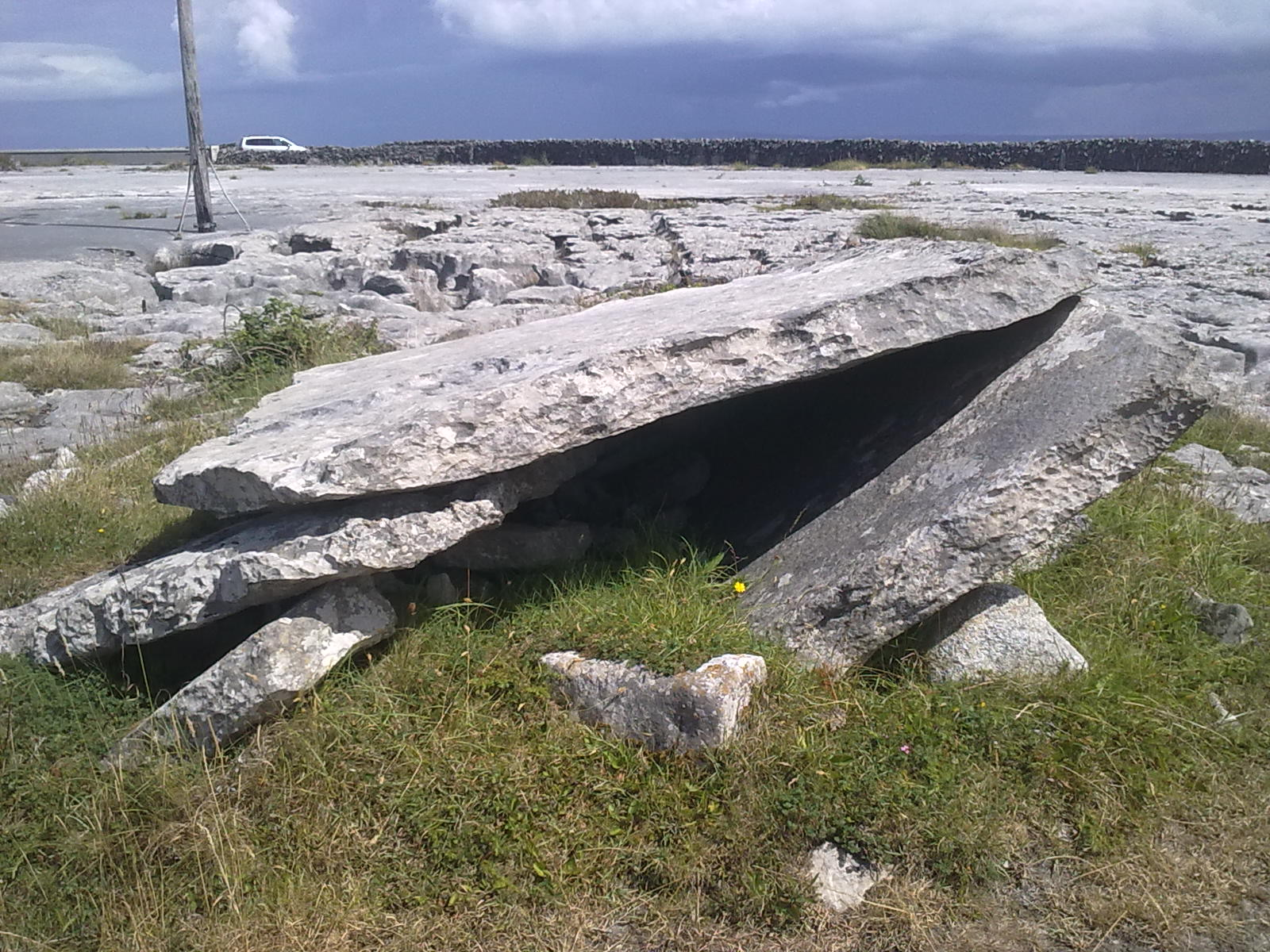
- The tomb in 2013

- Location in Ireland
- 53.087175°N 9.575707°W
- Type: wedge-shaped gallery grave
- Location: County Galway, Ireland

History
- Built: c. 3250 BC

National monument of Ireland
- Official name: Carrownlisheen Wedge Tomb
- Reference no.: 42

Carrownlisheen Wedge Tomb is a wedge-shaped gallery grave and National Monument located on Inishmaan, Ireland.

== Location ==
Carrownlisheen Wedge Tomb is located in the eastern lowlands of Inishmaan.

== History ==
Built c. 4000–2500 BC, this is a wedge-shaped gallery grave.
