= Inisheer Lighthouse =

Lighthouse in Galway Bay, Ireland

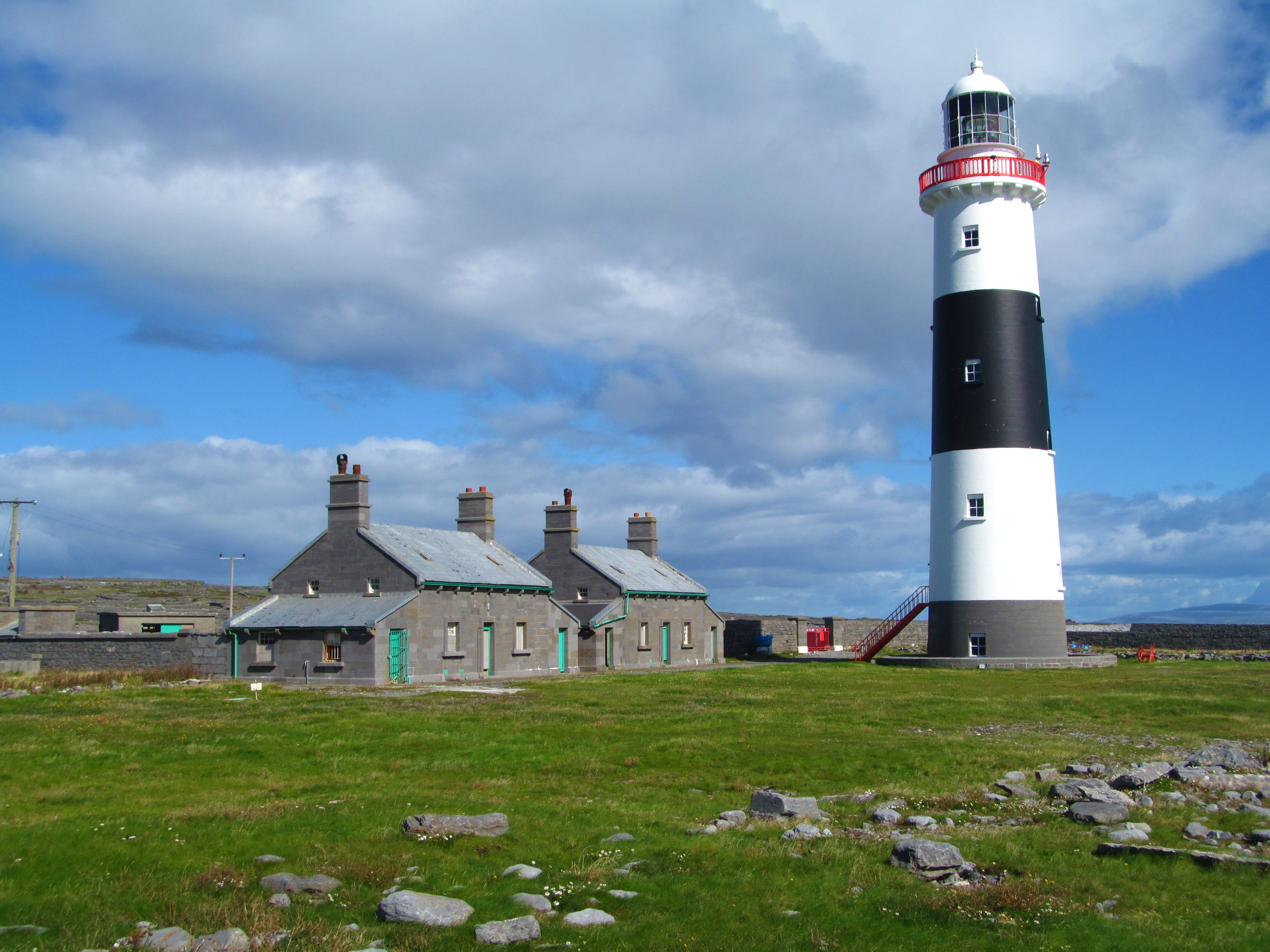
- Inisheer is one of four principal lighthouses in the Aran Islands
- Location: Aran Islands, Ireland
- Coordinates: 53.046360°N 9.526440°W

Tower
- Constructed: 1857
- Automated: 1978
- Height: 34 metres (112 ft)
- Operator: Commissioners of Irish Lights
- Racon: K

Light
- First lit: 1857
- Focal height: 34 metres (112 ft)
- Range: 18 nautical miles (33 km; 21 mi)
- Characteristic: Iso WR 12s

The Inisheer, Inis Oírr or Fardurris Point Lighthouse, is an active 19th century lighthouse located on the island of Inisheer, the smallest of the Aran Islands, in County Galway, Ireland. It marks the south-eastern entrance to Galway Bay and the Port of Galway known as the South Sound, with a red sector of the light marking the Finnis Rock. The Eeragh Lighthouse which marks the North Sound entrance to the bay on the north-western side of the islands, was also constructed at the same time. Inisheer and Eeragh both became operational in 1857.

== History ==
The first lighthouse on the Aran Islands was built in 1818 on Inishmore near Dun Oghil, but it became apparent that it was poorly positioned. Firstly, because it could not be seen at the hazardous ends of the Aran Islands chain, where the North and South Sound approaches were located, and secondly, its location on the highest point of the island also meant it could be obscured in poor weather conditions. Requests from the Revenue Commissioners to the Ballast Board, the predecessor of the Commissioners of Irish Lights to relocate the light went unheeded.

But in 1850 the Galway Harbour Commissioners asked the Board to construct a new lighthouse at the north-west end of the islands. To meet this request, it was determined that the best approach was to construct two lighthouses, one on Inisheer and the other, the Eeragh Lighthouse, on one of the Brannock Islands to the north-west of Inishmore.

The design of both lights was carried out by George Halpin Junior with construction starting in 1853. They were commissioned on 1 December 1857, with the Inishmore light being deactivated on the same date. The Inisheer Lighthouse had a first order optic, supplied by Chance Brothers of Birmingham that emitted a fixed white light with a red sector signalling the Finnis reef.

Daniel Crowe & Sons of Dublin constructed both lighthouses and associated buildings, the cost for Eeragh was £15,126.1s.7d. (equivalent to £1,822,660 as of 2023) with Inisheer being £14,252.2s.4d (equivalent to £1,717,345 as of 2023)

In 1913, an incandescent lamp powered by paraffin was installed and its characteristic changed from a fixed light to one that flashed every ten seconds. Inisheer was automated and electrified in 1978, but retained the Chance optics from 1913. In 2014 the optic was replaced by an LED light, with a slightly reduced range.

== Operation ==
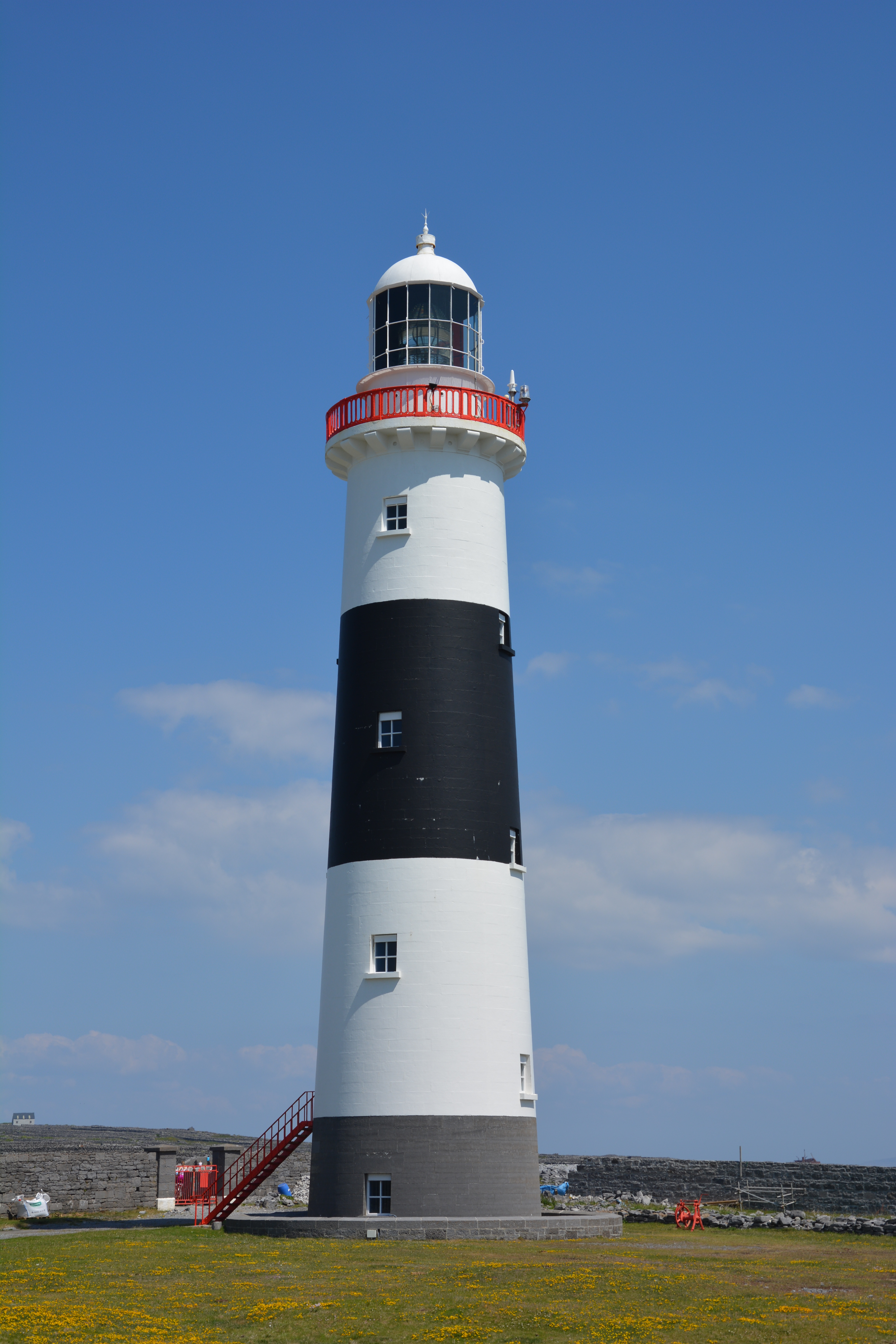
Detail of the tower

The optic is located at a height of 34 metres (112 ft), within a lantern room at the top of a limestone tower which has been painted white with a broad central black band. The two keeper's houses are built close by, but the light is now maintained by an attendant living some distance away, who monitors the equipment via a radio link.

With a focal height of 34 metres (112 ft) above the sea, the light from the first order Fresnel lens could be seen for 20 nautical miles in the case of white light and 16 nautical miles for the red light. With the installation of the LED light, this has reduced to 18 and 11 nautical miles respectively.

The light characteristic is now slightly different from that of 1913, the light emits a white or red light, depending on the direction, in isophase of 12 seconds, that is, it is illuminated for six seconds and darkened during other six. It emits red light in the sector between 245 ° and 269 °. In addition, the lighthouse is equipped with a radar or RACON beacon that emits the letter K in Morse code with a range of 13 nautical miles.

== Listed buildings ==
The lighthouse tower and the two keeper's houses are all listed within the National Inventory of Architectural Heritage, where it is noted "This dramatically sited lighthouse is a masterpiece of ashlar limestone construction".

== Access ==
Located at the southern point of the island on Fardurris point, the site and tower are closed apart from the occasional open day.

== See also ==
- List of lighthouses in Ireland
- MV Plassy which ran aground on Finnis reef in 1960
