= Templesaghtmacree =

- Teampall na Seacht Mac Rí
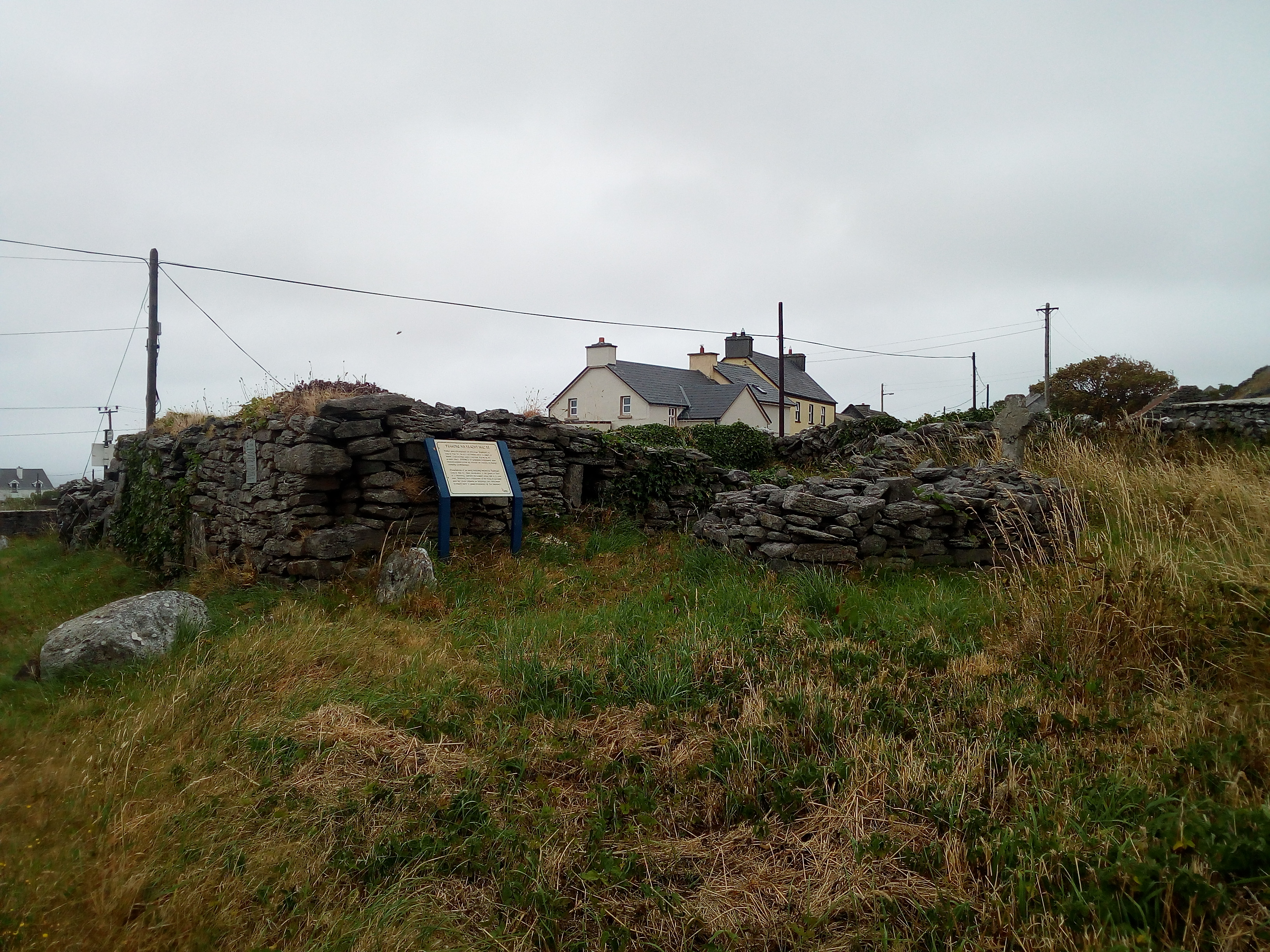

- Location within Ireland
- 53.083866°N 9.590158°W
- Location: Carrownlisheen, Inishmaan, County Galway
- Country: Ireland
- Denomination: Roman Catholic

Architecture
- Functional status: inactive
- Years built: c. 8th–10th centuries AD

Specifications
- Length: 10.85 m (35.6 ft)
- Width: 4.95 m (16.2 ft)
- Materials: limestone

Administration
- Diocese: Tuam
Designations
National monument of Ireland
- Official name: Templesaghtmacree
- Reference no.: 42

Templesaghtmacree is an Early Christian church and National Monument located on Inishmaan, Ireland.

== Location ==
Templesaghtmacree is located right in the centre of Inishmaan, the middle Aran Island. It is directly east of the modern Catholic church, the Church of Our Lady and St John.

== History ==
The name is derived from the Irish language, meaning "Church of the Seven King's Sons," commemorating seven men of royal birth who came to Inishmaan as hermits. It was formerly a site of pilgrimage.

== Church ==
A rectangular stone church measuring 10.85 m (35.6 ft) by 4.95 m (16.2 ft) built circa 8th–10th centuries, only the bases of its walls survive. A doorway and window are in the south wall. It also contains Leaba Cinndeirge ("Cinndeirg's bed"), a grave of an obscure female saint with a cross slab. Tobar Cinndeirge, a holy well, is nearby.
