= Inishmaan =

Island off Galway coast, Ireland

Native name: Inis Meáin
- View on Inis Meáin

- Location within island of Ireland

Geography
- Location: Atlantic Ocean
- Coordinates: 53°05′06″N 9°35′24″W
- Area: 2,342 acres (948 ha)
- Length: 4 km (2.5 mi)
- Width: 2.5 km (1.55 mi)
- Highest elevation: 84 m (276 ft)

Administration
- Ireland
- Province: Connacht
- County: Galway

Demographics
- Population: 184 (2022)
- Pop. density: 19/km^{2} (49/sq mi)

Inishmaan (/ˌɪnɪʃˈmæn/ IN-ish-MAN; Irish: Inis Meáin [ˈɪnʲɪʃ mʲaːnʲ], the official name, formerly spelled Inis Meadhóin, meaning "middle island") is the middle of the three main Aran Islands in Galway Bay, off the west coast of Ireland. It is part of County Galway in the province of Connacht. Inishmaan has a population of about 184 (census 2022), making it the least populous of the Aran Islands. It is one of the most important strongholds of traditional Irish culture. The island is predominantly Irish-speaking and part of the Gaeltacht, though all inhabitants have knowledge of English.

== Geology and geography ==
The island is an extension of The Burren. The terrain of the island is composed of limestone pavements with crisscrossing cracks known as "grykes", leaving isolated rocks called "clints". The limestones date from the Visean period (Lower Carboniferous), formed as sediments in a tropical sea about 350 million years ago, and compressed into horizontal strata with fossil corals, crinoids, sea urchins, and ammonites.

Glaciation following the Namurian phase facilitated greater denudation. The result is that Inishmaan is one of the finest examples of a Glacio-karst landscape in the world. The effects of the last glacial period (the Midlandian) are most in evidence, with the island overrun by ice during this glaciation. The impact of earlier karstification (solutional erosion) has been eliminated by the last glacial period. So any karstification now seen dates from around 10,000 years ago, so the island karst is recent.

Solutional processes have widened and deepened the grykes of the limestone pavement. Pre-existing lines of weakness in the rock (vertical joints) contribute to the formation of extensive fissures separated by clints (flat, pavement-like slabs). The rock karstification facilitates the formation of subterranean drainage.

== Climate and agriculture ==
The island has an unusually temperate climate. Average air temperatures range from 15 °C (59 °F) in July to 6 °C (43 °F) in January. The soil temperature does not usually drop below 6 °C (although the end of 2010 recorded a prolonged period of snow, the first in living memory). Since grass will grow once the temperature rises above 6 °C, the island (like the neighbouring Burren) has one of the longest growing seasons in Ireland or Britain, and supports diverse and rich plant growth. Late May is the sunniest time, and also likely the best time to view flowers, with the gentians and avens peaking (but orchid species blooming later).

== Flora and fauna ==
The island supports arctic, Mediterranean, and alpine plants side-by-side, due to the unusual environment. Like the Burren, the Aran Islands are renowned for their remarkable assemblage of plants and animals. The grykes (crevices) provide moist shelter, thus supporting a wide range of plants, including dwarf shrubs. Where the surface of the pavement is shattered into gravel, many of the hardier arctic or alpine plants can be found, but when the limestone pavement is covered by a thin layer of soil, patches of grass are seen, interspersed with plants such as gentians and orchids. Notable insects present include the butterfly the pearl-bordered fritillary (Boloria euphrosyne), brown hairstreak (Thecla betulae), marsh fritillary (Euphydryas aurinia) and wood white (Leptidea sinapis); the moths, the burren green (Calamia tridens), Irish annulet (Gnophos dumetata) and transparent burnet (Zygaena purpuralis); and the hoverfly Doros profuges.

== Landmarks ==
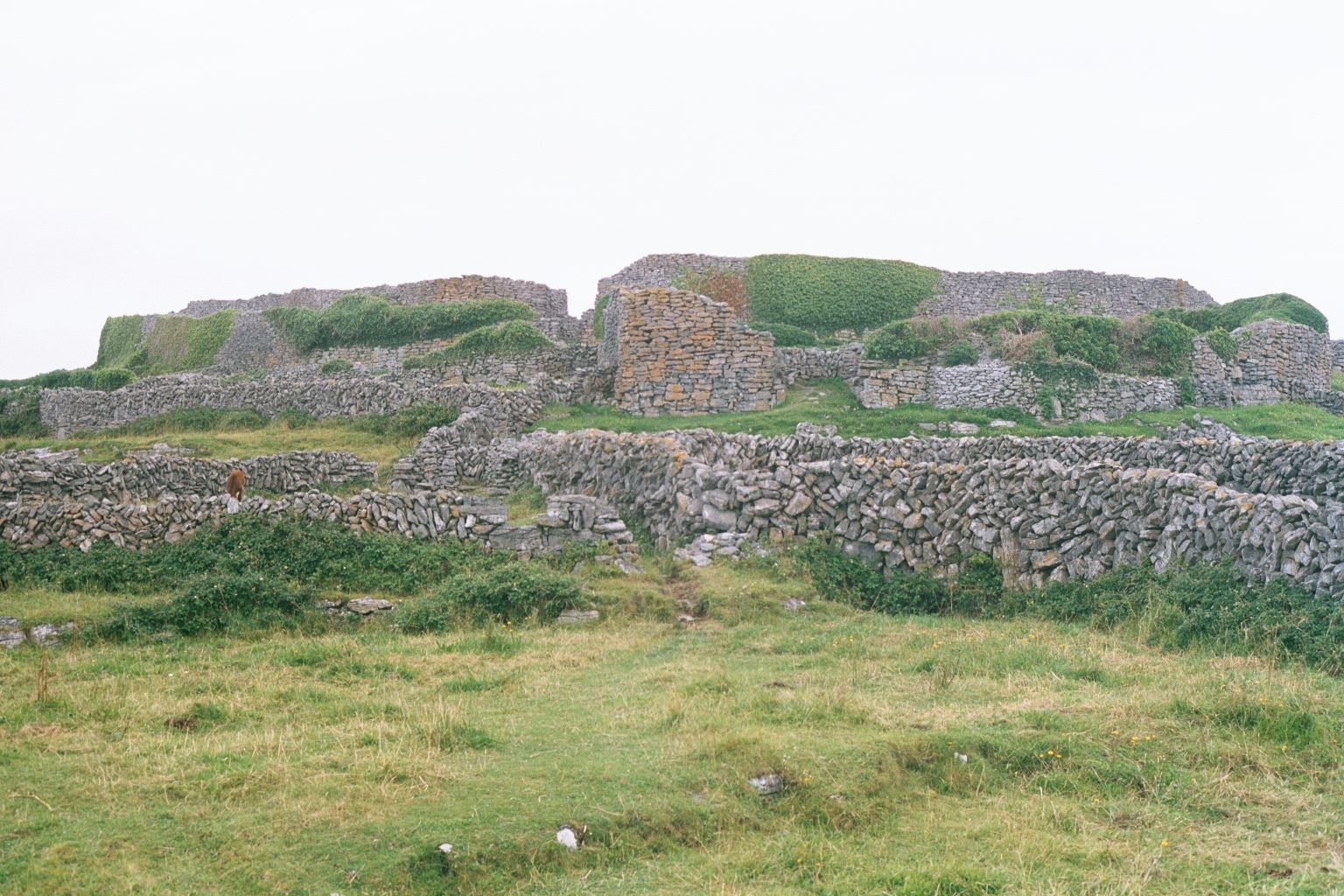
Dún Chonchúir (Conor's fort), Inishmaan

=== Archaeological sites ===
Eight sites on Inishmaan are designated as National Monuments (NM #42):

- Doonbeg Ringfort
- Carrownlisheen Wedge Tomb (Diarmuid and Gráinne's Bed)
- Templesaghtmacree, a church
- Carrownlisheen Cross
- Labbanakinneriga, a church
- Dún Fearbhaí, a cashel (stone ringfort)
- Kilcoonagh Church
- Dún Conor (Dún Chonchúir)

=== Synge's Cottage and Chair ===
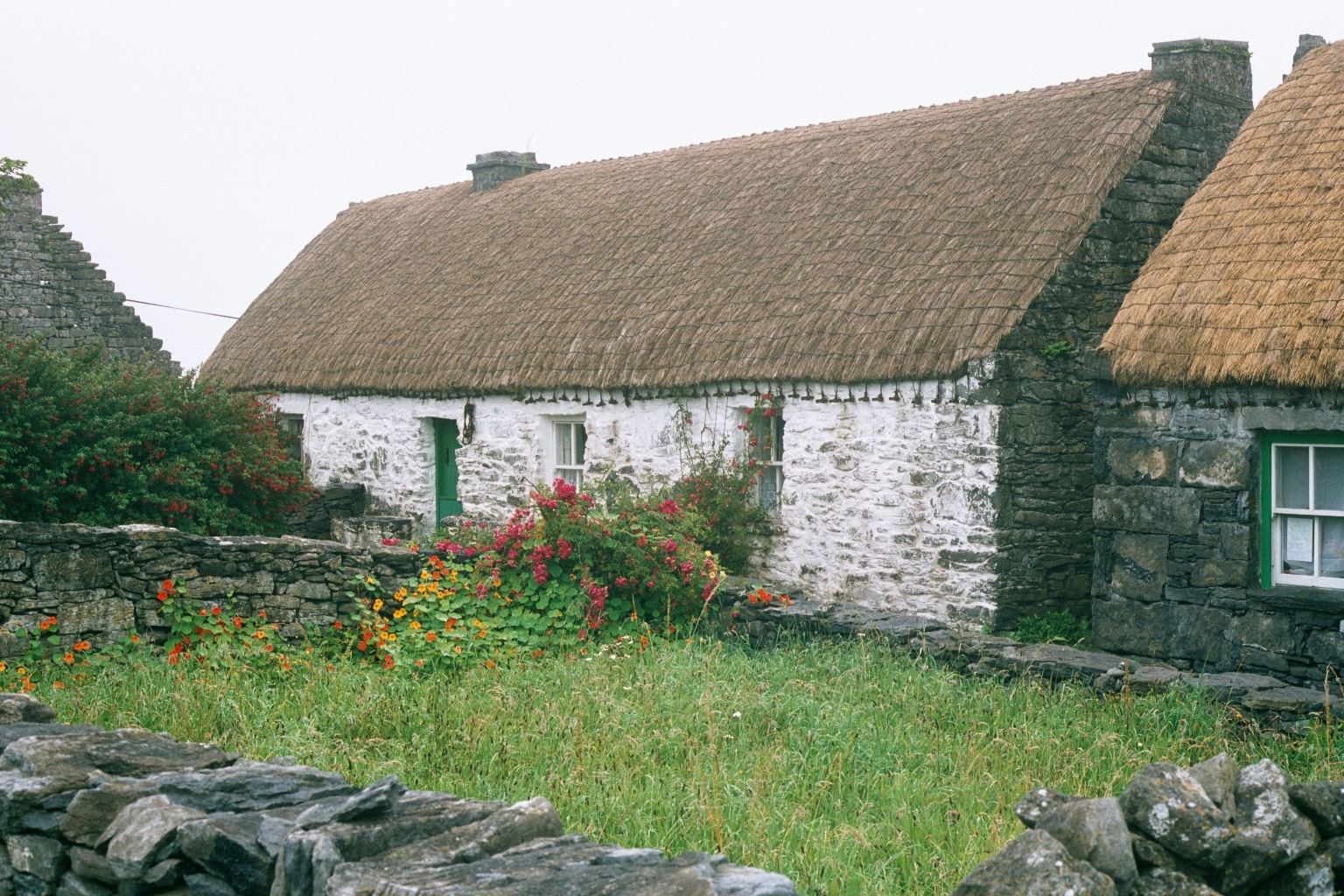
Synge's Cottage

Teach Synge is the house where John Millington Synge stayed on the island every summer from 1898 to 1902, where he was hosted by Bríd and Páidín Mac Donnchadha. It was here he is said to have got inspiration for his plays The Playboy of the Western World, Riders to the Sea, and many of his other works from stories he heard while on Inishmaan. The house he stayed in, Teach Synge, was inhabited by descendants of the Mac Donnchadha family until the 1970s, when it began to fall into disrepair. It has been restored to its original condition, and has been open to the public since August 1999.

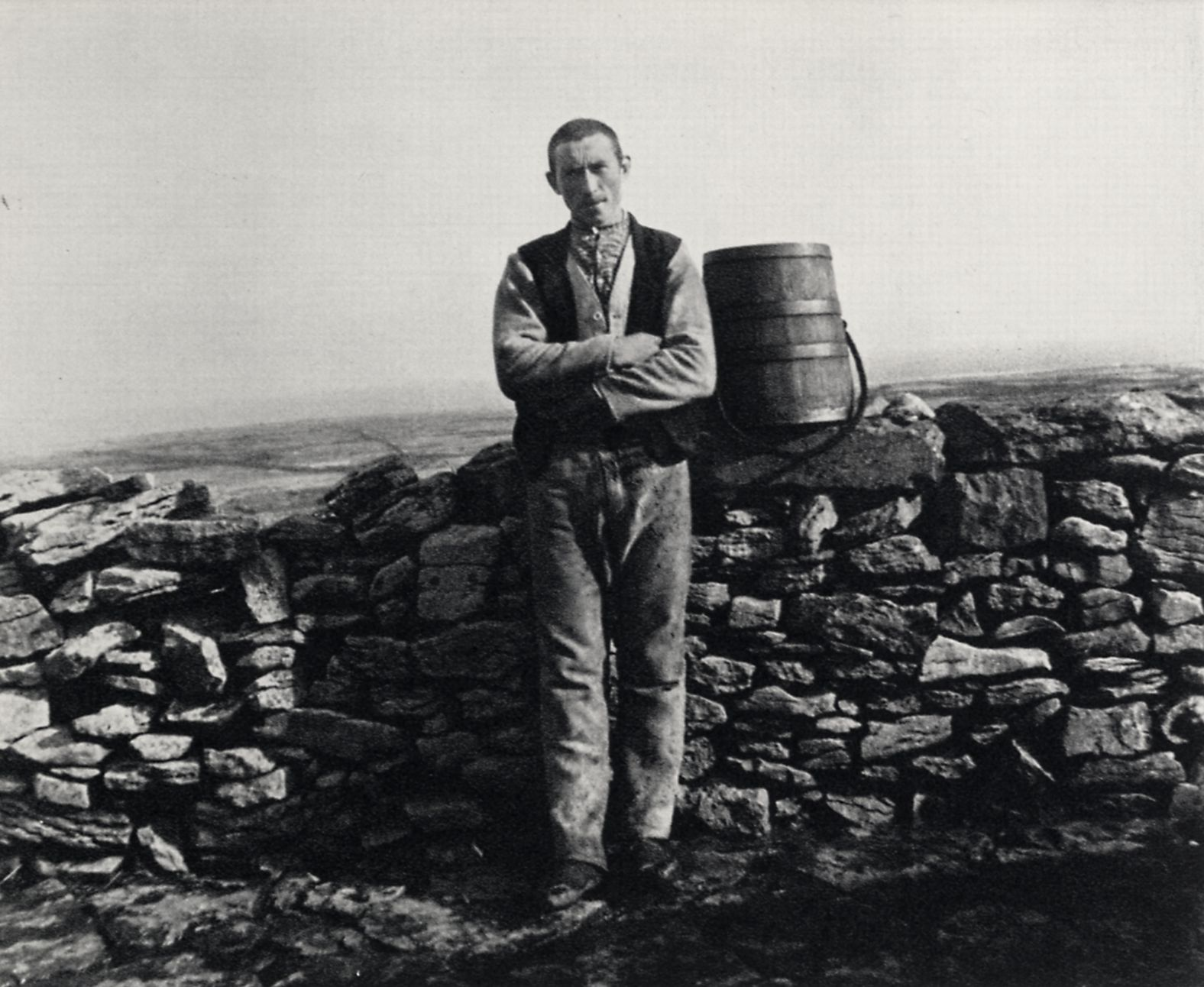
Islander (photo taken around 1900)

Cathaoir Synge (Synge's Chair) was the writer's favourite place on the island, overlooking Inis Mór and the Atlantic.

== Demographics ==
The table below reports data on Inishmaan's population taken from Discover the Islands of Ireland (Alex Ritsema, Collins Press, 1999) and the Census of Ireland. Census data in Ireland before 1841 are not considered complete and/or reliable.

Historical population

Year	Pop.	±%
1841	473	—
1851	503	+6.3%
1861	478	−5.0%
1871	433	−9.4%
1881	473	+9.2%
1891	456	−3.6%
1901	421	−7.7%
1911	420	−0.2%
1926	380	−9.5%

Year	Pop.	±%
1936	375	−1.3%
1946	388	+3.5%
1951	361	−7.0%
1956	361	+0.0%
1961	357	−1.1%
1966	342	−4.2%
1971	319	−6.7%
1979	237	−25.7%
1981	238	+0.4%

Year	Pop.	±%
1986	236	−0.8%
1991	216	−8.5%
1996	191	−11.6%
2002	187	−2.1%
2006	154	−17.6%
2011	157	+1.9%
2016	183	+16.6%
2022	184	+0.5%

Source: Central Statistics Office. "CNA17: Population by Off Shore Island, Sex and Year". CSO.ie.

== Infrastructure ==
The island is connected to the national grid via a submarine cable.

A desalination plant provides water for the residents, but water shortages are still a common occurrence.

=== Transport ===
Inishmaan has a new jetty ("Caladh Mor") since 2007, with services to Rossaveel and Doolin. It also has an airstrip connecting it to the mainland.

	Ferry services	
Rossaveel	Aran Island Ferries; Rossaveel–Inis Oírr	Inis Oírr
Kilronan, Inis Mór	Doolin Ferry; Inis Mór–Doolin (seasonal)	Inis Oírr

== Education ==
There is a primary school on the island, Scoil Náisiúnta Inis Meáin.

There is also a secondary school, Colaiste Naomh Eoin. Coláiste Naomh Eoin was opened on 1 September 2003 under the auspices of Coláiste Colmchille (Inverin) and the County Galway Vocational Education Committee. It caters for the entire second level educational needs of the Aran islands. Senior Cycle was first introduced in 2006. The school is housed in a building on hire from the local co-operative. Four school classrooms and the school office are located there. The new science laboratory was renovated in 2008. A woodwork, technical graphics and construction studies workshop was added to the infrastructure over 2008/2010. The school also has use of the local football pitch, in addition to a lined basketball court. The students of Coláiste Naomh Eoin wear a red V neck jumper with a grey polo neck with the crest of the school imprinted on them. Both male and female students wear black trousers with black shoes or runners.

== Public library ==
There is a public library on the island. It holds a diverse and quality collection of books, catering to all age groups. It is open every Tuesday and Thursday from 2.00pm to 4.00pm and on Saturdays from 11.00am to 1.00pm. The library provides a reference and local studies collection with information on the heritage and history of the island. There is also free internet access.

== Sport ==
Some of the limestone sea cliffs have attracted interest from rock-climbers.

Diving is popular.

Inishmaan is home to the game Cead. This is a traditional sport unique to the island. Cead means "permission" in Irish. Cead is only allowed to be played once a year, on Saint Patrick's Day. Only men can partake in the competitive aspect of the sport.

Colaiste Noamh Eoin (the island's secondary school) organises the annual Inis Iron Meáin Race, a running event which comprises a 5 km and 10 km road race and a 12 km beach run. The Inis Meáin Parkrun takes place every Saturday. Where other Parkruns in Ireland begin at 9:30, Inis Meáin Parkrun begins at noon, to allow day visitors using the Aran Island Ferry.

== In popular culture ==
The island is the setting for the 1996 play The Cripple of Inishmaan by Martin McDonagh.

== Gallery ==
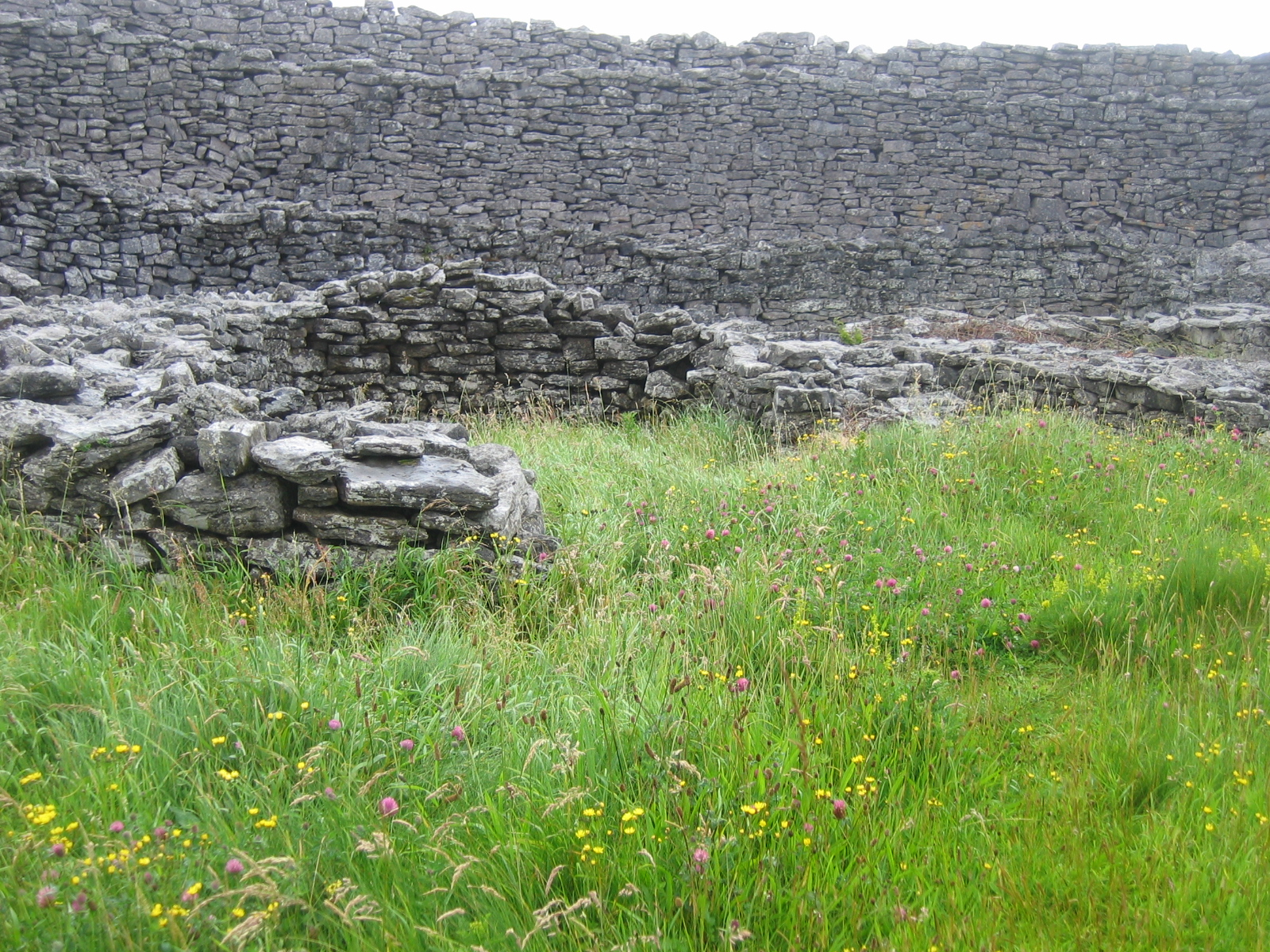
Inside Dún Chonchúir (Conor's fort), Inishmaan

Church of Our Lady and St. John

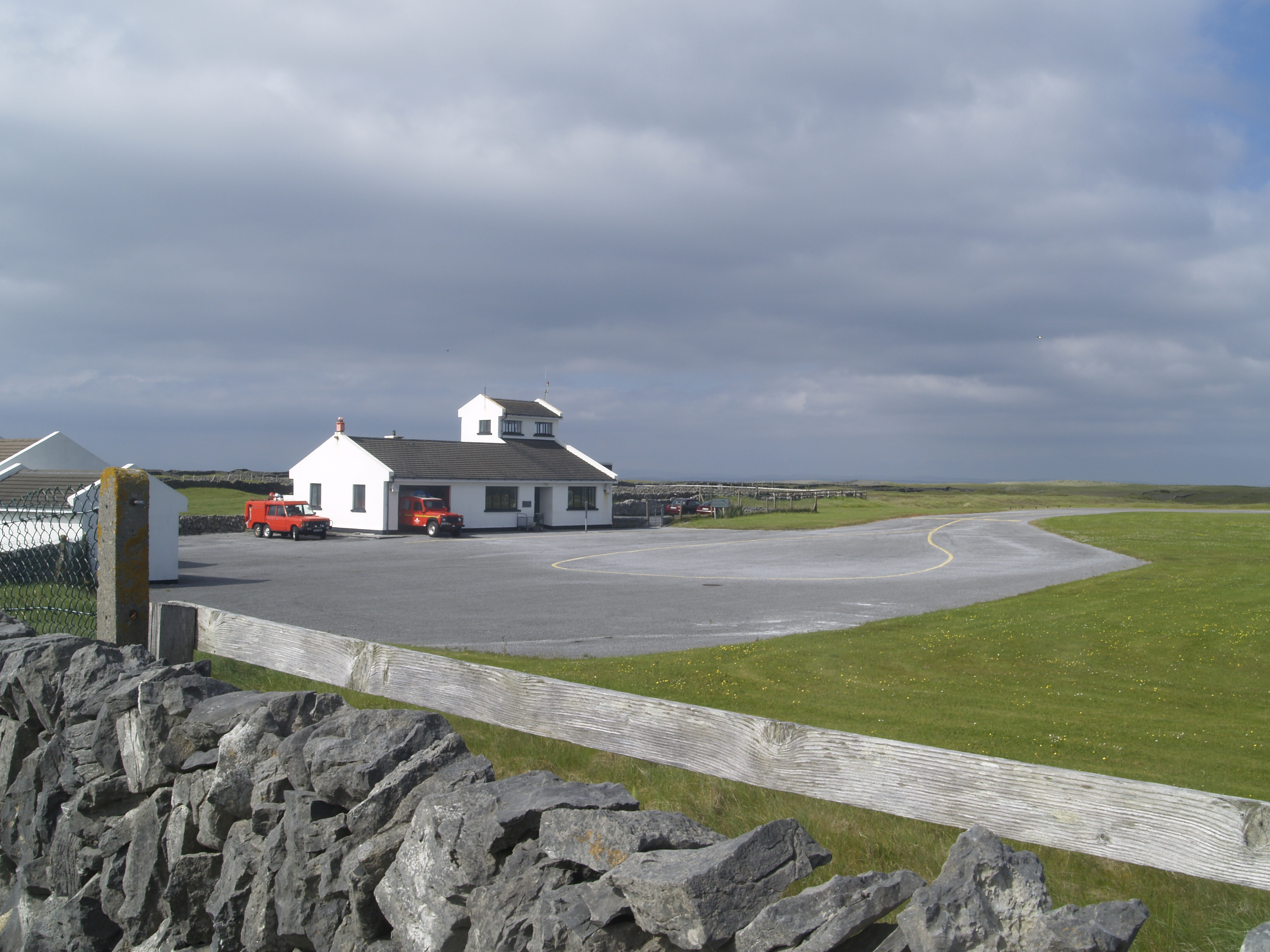
Inishmaan airport

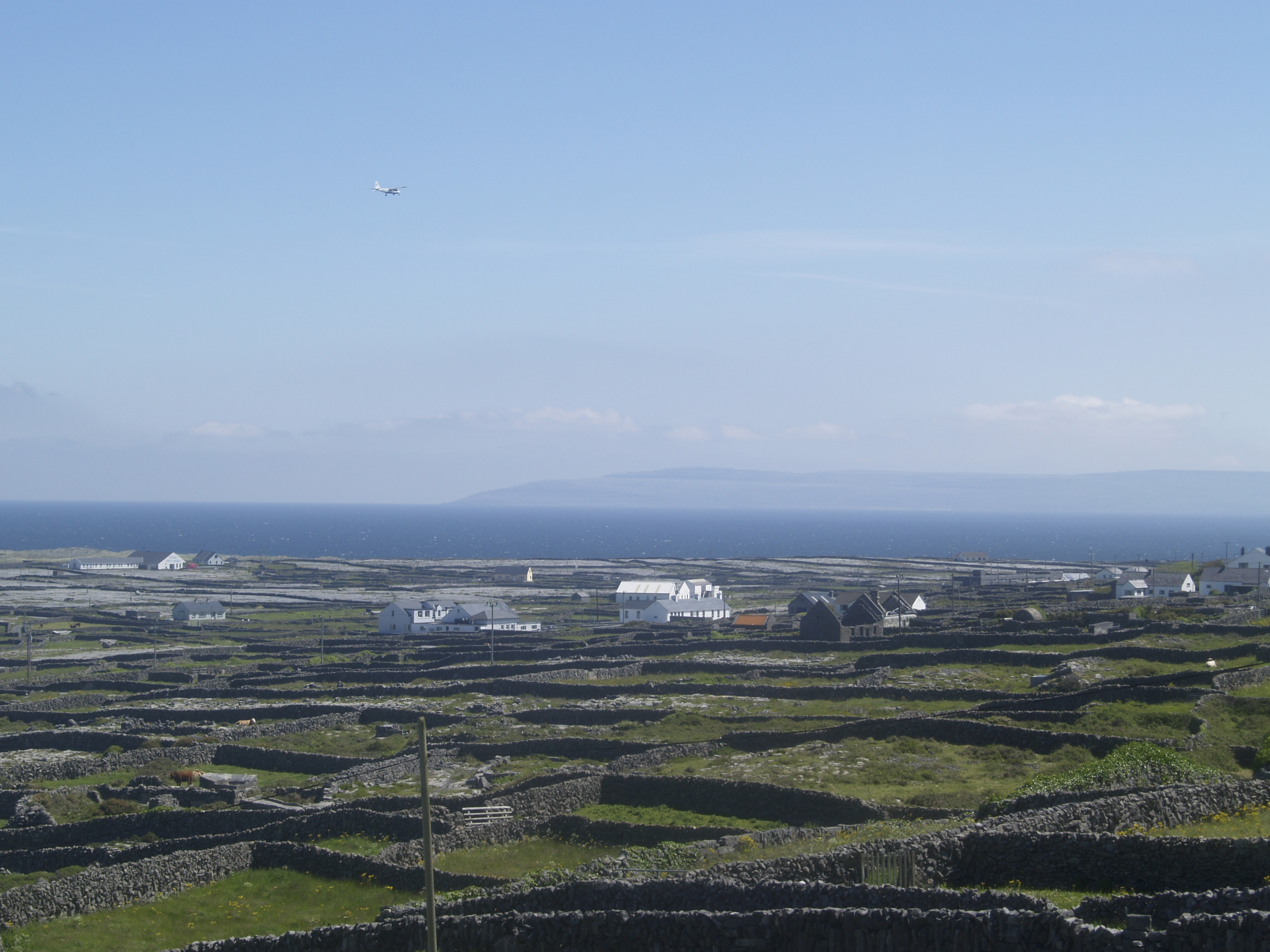
Inishmaan Landscape

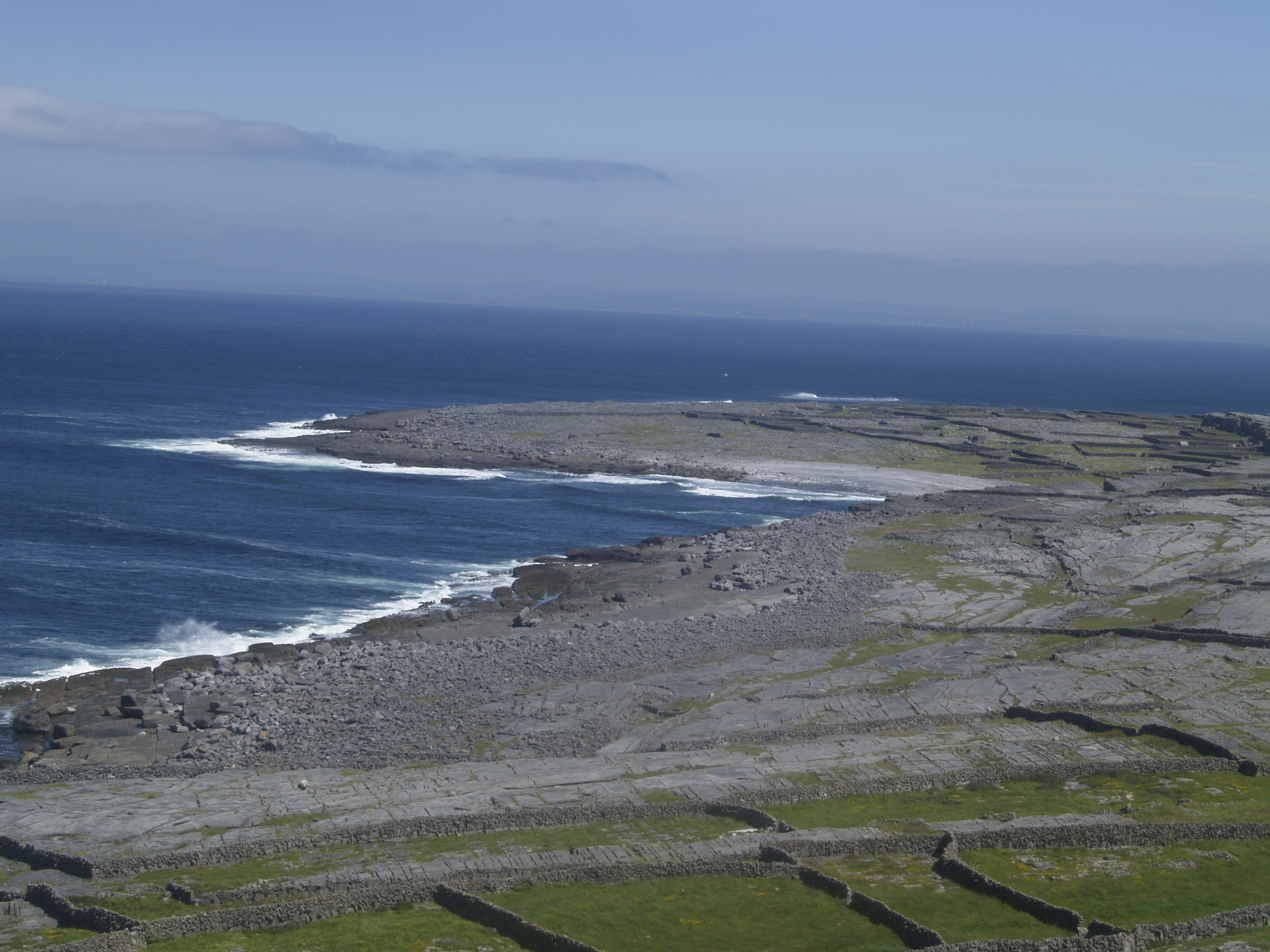
Inishmaan Coastline

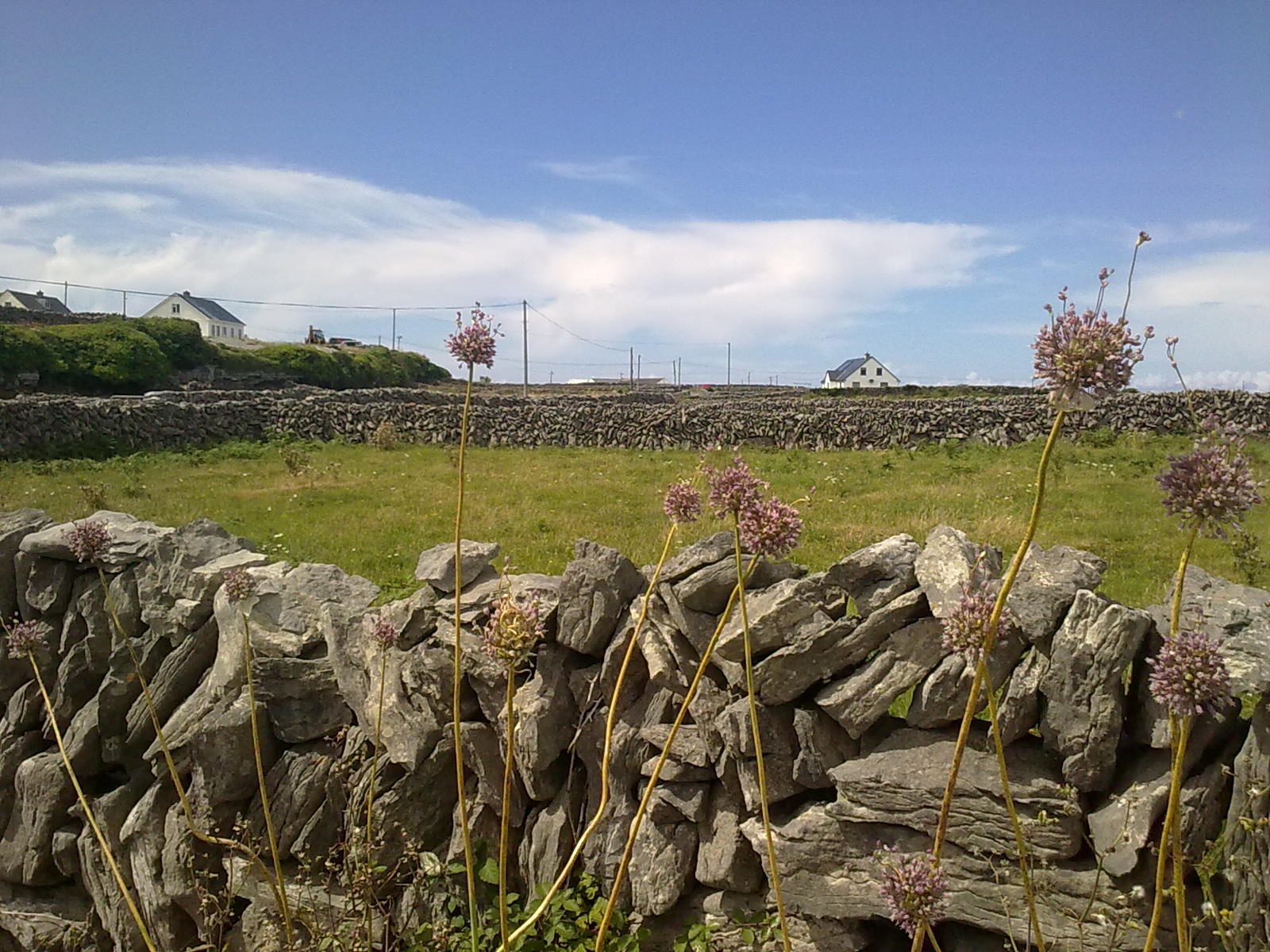
Wild garlic at Inishmaan
