= The Sisters of St. Joseph of Peace =

Roman Catholic religious order

The Sisters of St. Joseph of Peace are a Catholic religious order of women founded in 1884 in the Diocese of Nottingham by Margaret Anna Cusack.

== History ==
Cusack was raised in the Anglican church, but converted to Catholicism in 1858. She entered the Poor Clare Sisters, and was then known as Sister Francis Clare. She worked in many forms of ministry in Ireland over the years, and was known for her writing. In 1881, she went to Knock, in County Mayo, to open a school for young women during the day, which held evening classes for daytime land workers. Other women were inspired by this work, and this led her to decision to form her own community, the Sisters of Saint Joseph of Peace. Conflict with Church leaders in Knock caused her to seek support in England, and in 1884, with the support of Cardinal Manning and Bishop Bagshawe, she received approval for her new order from Pope Leo XIII, and the Congregation of the Sisters of St. Joseph of Peace was founded.

In 1888 Cusack, who had left the convent, became a Protestant. The survival of the order fell to Bagshawe and Honoria Gaffney and they are described by some as the co-founders. Gaffney had to redo all of the application details, and the order was not formally approved until 1924.

The order is governed as a single congregation located, and administered, in three geographical regions:

- Sacred Heart Province in the United Kingdom includes Sisters and Associates living in England, Ireland, and Scotland.
- St. Joseph Province in the Eastern United States includes Sisters and Associates living in Delaware, Florida, North Carolina, Maryland, New Jersey, New York, and Rhode Island.
- Our Lady Province in the Western United States includes Sisters and Associates living in Alaska, California, Minnesota, Nevada, Oregon, Washington, British Columbia, El Salvador, and Guatemala.

In 2009, the sisters joined the mission at the Hôpital Sacré Coeur in Milot, Haiti.

== Noted sisters ==
- Margaret Anna Cusack, also known as Sister Francis
- Sister Evangelista Gaffney, born Honoria Gaffney

== See also ==
- Saint Joseph
