= Kilronan =

Village on island of Inishmore in Ireland

Kilronan Irish: Cill Rónáin
- Village
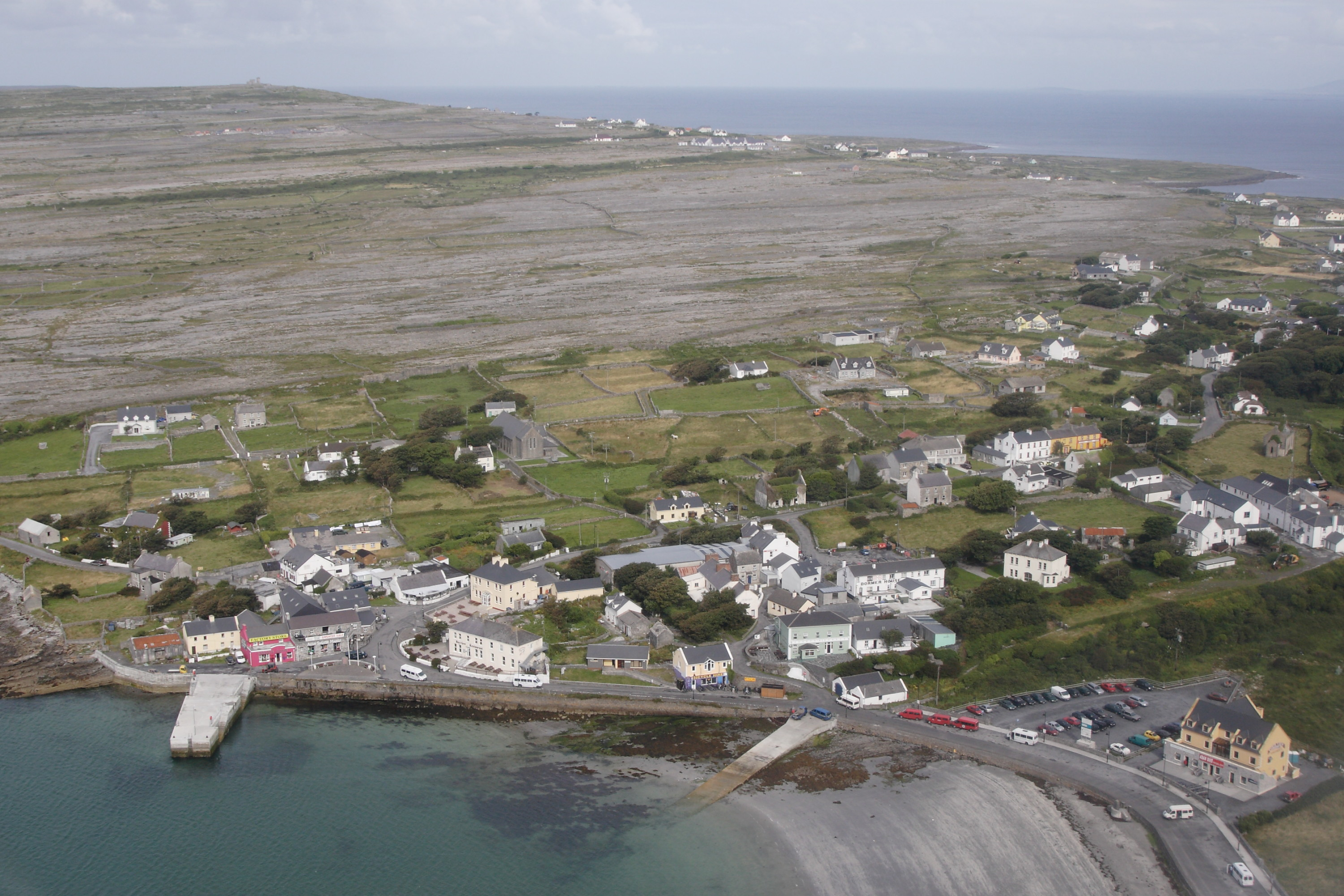
- Aerial view

- Location in Ireland
- Coordinates: 53°07′29″N 9°40′06″W
- Country: Ireland
- Province: Connacht
- County: County Galway
- Elevation: 0 m (0 ft)

Population (2011 census of Ireland)
  - Total: 297
- Time zone: UTC+0 (WET)
  - Summer (DST): UTC-1 (IST (WEST))
- Irish Grid Reference: L883095
- Cill Rónáin is the official name. The anglicised spelling Kilronan has no official status.

Cill Rónáin (Irish: meaning "Church of Ronan"), unofficially anglicized as Kilronan, is the main settlement on Inishmore, one of the Aran Islands off the coast of County Galway in Ireland. The ferries serving the island call at Doolin, County Clare and also Rossaveal, County Galway. The main industries are fishing and tourism. The village is situated in the Gaeltacht (Irish speaking district), and thus only the Irish version of the name has any legal or official status. Schoolchildren visit the village to improve their Irish at summer schools. As of 2016, 247 people live in the village and 43.3% of the population speak Irish on a daily basis outside the education system.

== Popular culture ==
Kilronan is the subject of The Magnetic Fields's song "Abigail, Belle of Kilronan" from their album 69 Love Songs.

== People ==
Honoria Gaffney who led The Sisters of St. Joseph of Peace was born here in 1853.

	Ferry services	
Rossaveel	Aran Island Ferries; Rossaveel–Inis Mór	Terminus
Galway	Aran Island Ferries; Galway–Inis Mór (seasonal)	Terminus
Terminus	Doolin Ferry; Inis Mór–Doolin (seasonal)	Inis Meáin
Terminus	Doolin Ferry; Inis Mór–Doolin (seasonal)	Doolin

== See also ==
- List of towns and villages in Ireland
