= Rossaveal =

Village in County Galway, Ireland

Rossaveal Ros an Mhíl
- Village
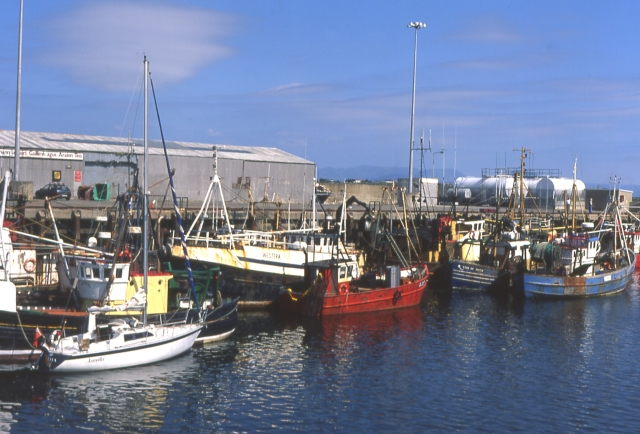

- Location in Ireland
- Coordinates: 53°16′15″N 9°33′04″W
- Country: Ireland
- Province: Connacht
- County: County Galway
- Barony: Moycullen
- Traditional district: Connemara
- Elevation: 1 m (3.3 ft)
- Time zone: UTC+0 (WET)
  - Summer (DST): UTC-1 (IST (WEST))
- Irish Grid Reference: L965255
- Ros an Mhíl is the only official name.

Rossaveal or Rossaveel (Irish: Ros an Mhíl or Ros a' Mhíl) is a Gaeltacht village and townland in the Connemara district of County Galway in the west of Ireland. It is the main ferry port for the Aran Islands in Galway Bay. It is about 37 kilometres (23 mi) from Galway city. The village is located in the Barony of Moycullen.

The Irish name Ros an Mhíl means "peninsula (or wood) of the whale (or sea monster)". It may also mean "the wooded hill". The village is the home of the Ros a' Mhíl centre under Coláiste Chamuis, an Irish language immersion summer camp for teenagers. It is served by Bus Éireann route 424 from Galway. A ferry service to the Aran Islands runs from the harbour.

== Irish language ==
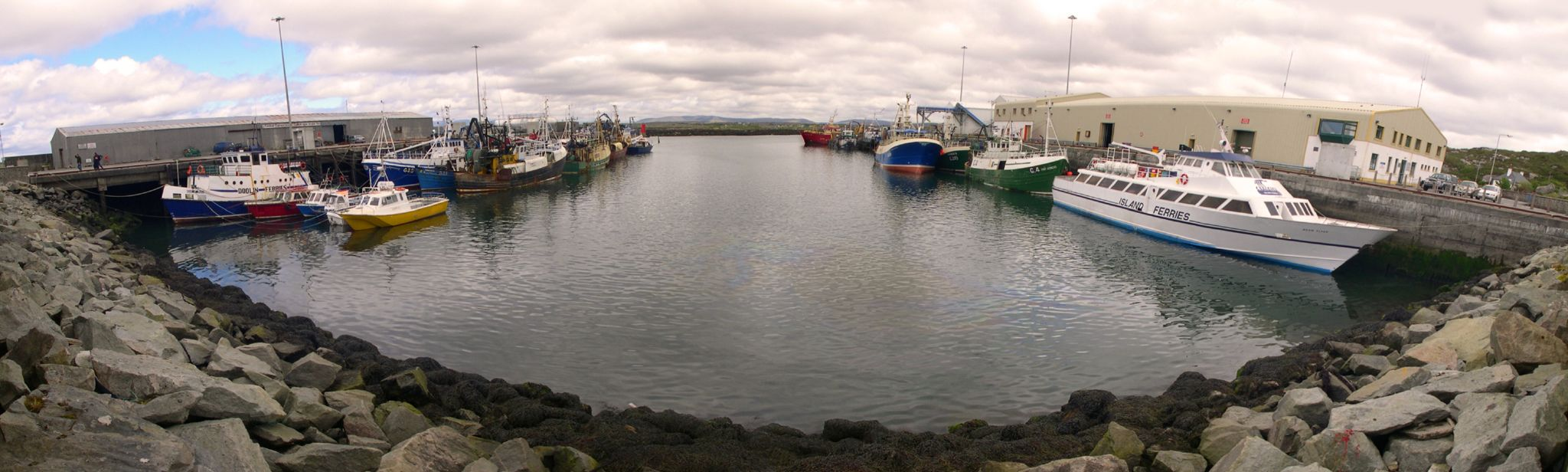
Rossaveel Harbour

As of the 2011 census, there were 208 people living in Ros an Mhíl townland, with 73% of these speaking Irish daily.

	Ferry services	
Terminus	Aran Island Ferries; Rossaveel–Inis Mór	Kilronan, Inis Mór
Terminus	Aran Island Ferries; Rossaveel–Inis Oírr	Inis Meain

== See also ==
- List of towns and villages in the Republic of Ireland
