= Eeragh Lighthouse =

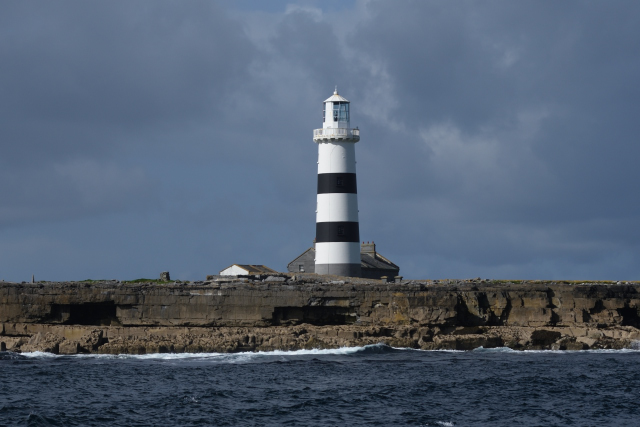
- Eeragh is one of four principal lighthouses in the Aran Islands
- Location: Aran Islands, Ireland
- Coordinates: 53.1481°N 9.8564°W

Tower
- Constructed: 1857
- Automated: 1978
- Height: 31 metres (102 ft)
- Power source: Thermomechanical generator, wind power, solar energy
- Operator: Commissioners of Irish Lights

Light
- First lit: 1857
- Focal height: 35 metres (115 ft)
- Range: 18 nautical miles (33 km; 21 mi)
- Characteristic: Fl W 15s

Eeragh Lighthouse is an active lighthouse located on Rock Island, one of the Brannock Islands, part of the Aran Islands archipelago in County Galway, Ireland. It marks the north-western entrance to Galway Bay and the port of Galway known as the North Sound. Due to its location it is also known as the Aran North Lighthouse. The lighthouse on Inisheer at the south-eastern end of the islands was also constructed at the same time. Eeragh and Inisheer both became operational in 1857.

== History ==
The first lighthouse on the Aran Islands was built in 1818 on Inishmore near Dun Oghil, but it became apparent that it was poorly positioned. Firstly, because it could not be seen at the hazardous ends of the Aran Islands chain, where the North and South Sound approaches were located, and secondly, its location on the highest point of the island also meant it could be obscured in poor weather conditions. Requests from the Revenue Commissioners to the Ballast Board, the predecessor of the Commissioners of Irish Lights to relocate the light went unheeded.

But in 1850 the Galway Harbour Commissioners asked the Board to construct a new lighthouse at the north-west end of the islands. To meet this request, it was determined that the best approach was to construct two lighthouses, one on Eeragh and the other, the Inisheer Lighthouse, at the south-eastern end of the island chain.

The design of both lights was carried out by George Halpin Junior with construction starting in 1853. They were commissioned on 1 December 1857, with the Inishmore light being deactivated that same date.

Daniel Crowe & Sons of Dublin constructed both lighthouses and associated buildings, the cost for Eeragh was £15,126.1s.7d. (equivalent to £1,822,660 as of 2023) with Inisheer being £14,252.2s.4d (equivalent to £1,717,345 as of 2023)

== Operation ==
Eeragh inherited the light characteristic from the Inishmore light of a 30s flash in a period of 3 minutes, using a flashing optic system from Wilkins of London, whereas Inisheer originally displayed a fixed white light using a Chance Brothers optic. In 1904 a new optic was installed which used vaporized paraffin. In 1958 the characteristic was changed to a 1.2 second flash every 15 seconds.

Following automation of the lighthouse in 1978, when the optics were replaced again, a number of different power sources were used to power the light. These included a Thermomechanical generator (TMG) which provided electricity to power the batteries for the revolving lamps, with a backup diesel generator. The TMG proved to be very useful in maintaining the battery charge, but its maintenance overheads meant that it was eventually replaced with a wind generator in 1983. In 2006 the light was switched to one powered by solar panels and its range reduced to 18 nautical miles.

The tower made of tough limestone was originally painted white with two red bands, but in 1932 the bands were painted black.

== Listed buildings ==
The lighthouse tower and associated houses are all listed within the National Inventory of Architectural Heritage, where it is noted “This lighthouse, with its typically flared walls and roof lantern, performed the critical function of safeguarding mariners along the coast around the west end of Aran. The accompanying lighthouse keepers' houses complete an interesting ensemble of maritime heritage interest.”

== See also ==
- List of lighthouses in Ireland
