= Mary Byrne (witness) =

Witness of the apparition at Knock, Ireland (1850–1936)

Mary Byrne (sometimes Beirne)
- Born: 1850
- Died: 19 October 1936 (aged 85–86); Ireland
- Known for: witness of the apparition at Knock, County Mayo

Mary Byrne later Mary O'Connell (1850 – 19 October 1936) was an Irish woman considered to be the chief witness of the apparition at Knock, County Mayo.

== Life ==
Mary Byrne was born in 1850, the eldest daughter of the three children of Dominick and Margaret Byrne (née Bourke). Byrne was one of 15 people who witnessed an unusual sight at the gable end of the church on 21 August 1879, later the site of the Knock Shrine. She was brought there at 8:15pm by the housekeeper of the parish priest, Mary McCloughlin. Upon her arrival, Byrne saw three figures hovering 2 feet in the air, and was told by McCloughlin that two of the figures were the Blessed Virgin Mary and Saint Joseph. Byrne identified the third figure of Saint John the Evangelist, as he bore a resemblance to a statues at a church in Lecanvey, near Westport, County Mayo. The witnesses claimed that it was raining heavily, but that no rain hit the area in which the apparitions stood. Byrne went to nearby houses, and brought the rest of the group of 15 to witness the apparition, including her siblings, Dominick and Margaret, and her mother. The parish priest, Archdeacon Bartholomew Cavanagh, refused to attend the site as he did not believe his housekeeper's claims. The story of the apparition at Knock spread, with Byrne being considered the chief witness to it. In 1880, on the first anniversary of the vision, Byrne took part in a commemorative procession carrying a banner of the Virgin Mary. After the apparition, all the witnesses gave testimony to a commission of inquiry into the event, which took place just sxi weeks after the apparition. Described as "intelligent, forthcoming, earnest, and truthful", Byrne, along with her fellow witnesses, was deemed credible.

Byrne married James O'Connell on 1 July 1882. He was from a local village, Becan. The couple had five sons and a daughter. Two of their sons, Dominick and Patrick, became policemen, Patrick in Chicago and Dominick in Belfast with the Royal Irish Constabulary. After she was widowed in 1926, Byrne lived near Knock with James, her eldest son. Many of the pilgrims to Knock would visit the house to touch her. Byrne insisted that when she closed her eyes and opened them again, she could see the vision. In 1932, she gave a deposition and did not waver from her previous testimony. She signed a sworn statement on 27 January 1936 affirming what she witnessed at Knock. She was examined as part of the second commission of inquiry into Knock in August 1936, and is reported to have impressed them with her clear recollection, stating "I am clear about everything I have said and I make this statement knowing I am going before my God."

== Death ==
Byrne died on 19 October 1936, and is buried beside her husband in Knock cemetery.
