= Port of Galway =

Port in Galway, Ireland

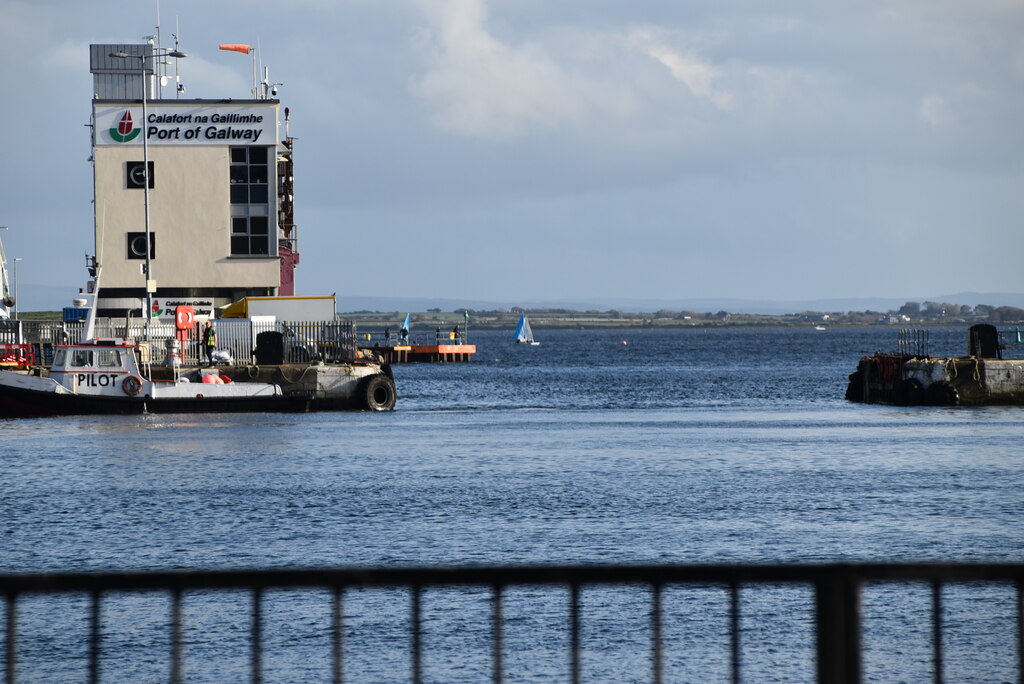
- Port of Galway building at the entrance to Galway Docks
- Interactive map of Port of Galway
- Location within Ireland
- Native name: Calafort na Gaillimhe

Location
- Country: Ireland
- Location: Galway
- Coordinates: 53°16′13″N 9°03′00″W
- UN/LOCODE: IEGWY

Details
- Operated by: Galway Harbour Company
- Type of Harbor: Coastal tide gate
- Size of harbour: 7.25 acres (2.93 ha)
- Land area: 10 acres (4.0 ha)
- No. of berths: 8
- CEO: Conor O'Dowd
- Harbour Master: Capt. Brian Sheridan

Statistics
- Annual cargo tonnage: 500,259 (2022)
- Annual revenue: ▲€5.2 million (2022)
- Net income: ▲€1.4 million (2022)
- Website; Official website

The Port of Galway (Irish: Calafort na Gaillimhe) is a seaport situated in Galway, Ireland. Located on the west coast of Ireland, the port is operated by the Galway Harbour Company.

== History ==
Galway's development as a trading port dates back to the 14th century. Ships then docked by the Spanish Arch. In 1380, King Richard II granted permission for merchants from the Iberian Peninsula and Galway to engage in direct trade, strengthening the city's commercial links with France, Flanders, and Italy.

In 1832, the Harbour Commissioners constructed the Commercial Dock. Over the next century, the docks expanded, with additional land reclaimed from the sea to accommodate growing maritime activities.

== Operations ==
The port primarily handles bulk cargo such as fuel, timber, cement, and fishery products, with an annual throughput of approximately 500,000 tonnes of goods as of 2022. Its inner dock can accommodate vessels up to 6,000 tonnes deadweight (DWT) and provides berthing for up to six vessels simultaneously.

In addition to cargo operations, the port hosts seasonal passenger ferry services, including routes to the Aran Islands and Cliffs of Moher, which operate from March to September. The port also supports leisure activities such as sailing and marine tourism, with facilities for small vessels and recreational users.

The port operates a coastal tide gate system to regulate water levels and ensure safe navigation within the harbour. Its facilities include warehouses, storage areas, and a customs checkpoint to streamline the handling of cargo and passenger services.

== New Port ==
From the beginning of the 21st century, plans have been proposed to relocate and extend the existing port facilities. In January 2014, a planning application was lodged for the project.

In April 2026, permission was granted by An Coimisiún Pleanála for an extension of the port, including a deep-water docking facility and new marina, a naval berth, as well as a spur to the Dublin–Galway railway line.

After the completion of the new port, the current docks are to be redeveloped to as part of the Galway Harbour Project.

== Traffic ==
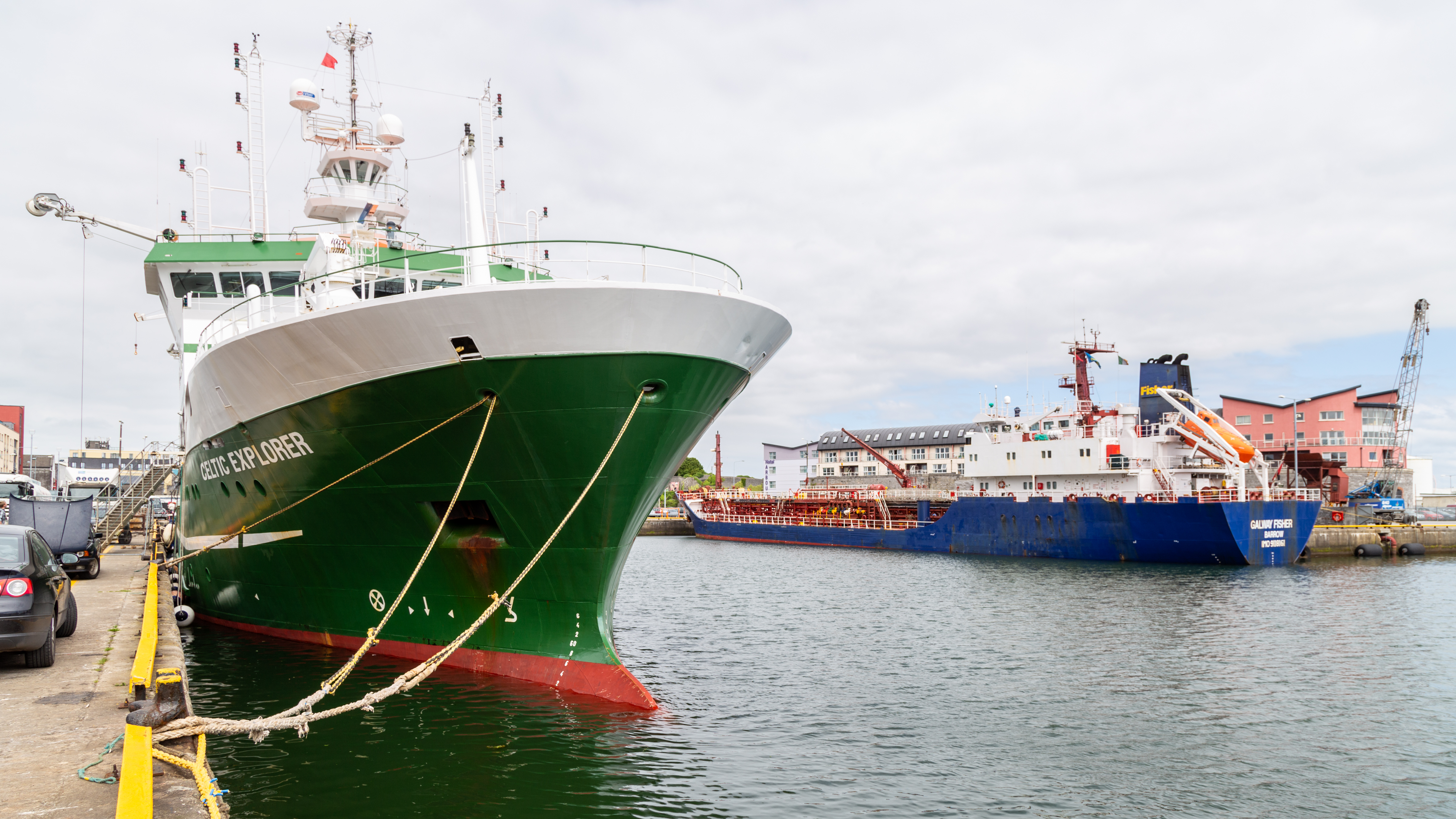
View from Mulvoy Quay

The port can accommodate vessels up to 6,000 tonnes deadweight (DWT), with its total quay length capable of berthing up to six vessels simultaneously in the inner dock, depending on the size of the vessels.

	Ferry services	
Terminus	Aran Island Ferries; Galway–Inis Mór (seasonal)	Kilronan, Inis Mór
