= Tawny =

Tawny may refer to:

- Tawny (given name), a feminine given name
- Tawny (color)
- Tawny port, a fortified wine
- Tawny (album), a 1954 record album by Jackie Gleason
- Tawny, a townland in Kilcar, County Donegal, Ireland
- Tawny, also known as Tamney, a village and townland in Clondavaddog, County Donegal, Ireland

== See also ==
- Tenné, a "stain" used in heraldry
- Mister Tawky Tawny, a fictional character in the Marvel Family comics
- Tawny Man, a fantasy book trilogy by Robin Hobb
- Tawney, surname
