= Benan =

Benan may refer to:

- Saint Benan, an apostle of St. Patrick
- Teampull Bheanáin, an oratory on Inishmore, Galway Bay, Ireland
- Sheshi, a Hyksos king of Egypt's fifteenth dynasty
