= The Amazing Race 12 =

Season of television series

- Season 12
- Region 1 DVD cover
- Presented by: Phil Keoghan
- No. of teams: 11
- Winners: TK Erwin and Rachel Rosales
- No. of legs: 11
- Distance traveled: 30,000 mi (48,000 km)
- No. of episodes: 11

Release
- Original network: CBS
- Original release: November 4, 2007 – January 20, 2008

Additional information
- Filming dates: July 8 – July 29, 2007

Series chronology
- ← Previous; Season 11 Next → Season 13

The Amazing Race 12 is the twelfth season of the American reality competition show The Amazing Race. Hosted by Phil Keoghan, it featured eleven teams of two, each with a pre-existing relationship, competing in a race around the world for US$1,000,000. This season visited four continents and ten countries, traveling approximately 30,000 miles (48,000 km) over eleven legs. Filming took place from July 8 to July 29, 2007. Starting in Los Angeles, California, racers traveled through Ireland, the Netherlands, Burkina Faso, Lithuania, Croatia, Italy, India, Japan, and Taiwan, before returning to the United States and finishing in Girdwood, Alaska. New elements introduced this season included the U-Turn, where one team could dictate that another team must complete both options of the Detour before being able to continue, and a new non-elimination leg penalty called the Speed Bump, where teams that finished in last place were required to complete an additional task in the following leg. The season premiered on CBS on November 4, 2007, and concluded on January 20, 2008.

Newly dating couple TK Erwin and Rachel Rosales were the winners of the season, while father and daughter Ronald and Christina Hsu finished in second place, and grandson and grandfather Nicolas Fulks and Donald Jerousek finished in third place.

== Format ==
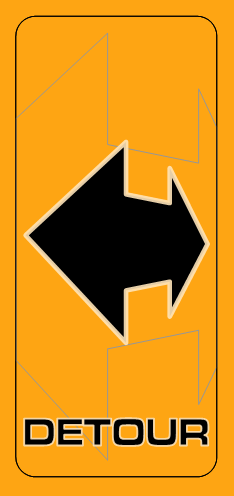
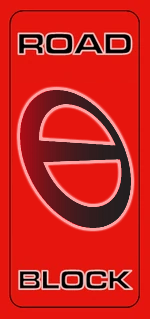
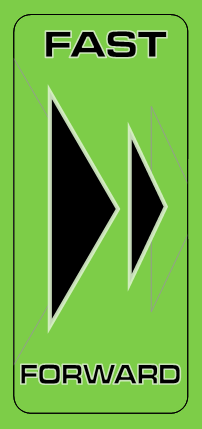
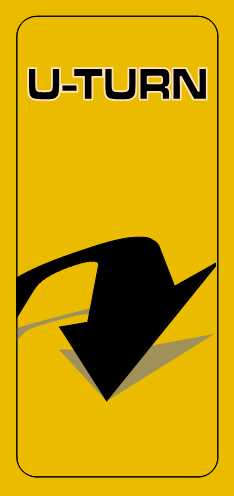
The clues which contestants receive during the course of the race generally fall into five categories: Route Info, Detour, Roadblock, Fast Forward, and U-Turn.

The Amazing Race is a reality television show created by Bertram van Munster and Elise Doganieri, and hosted by Phil Keoghan. The series follows teams of two competing in a race around the world. Each leg of the race requires teams to deduce clues, navigate foreign environments, interact with locals, perform physical and mental challenges, and travel on a limited budget provided by the show. At each stop during the leg, teams receive clues inside sealed envelopes, which fall into one of these categories:

- Route Info: These are simple instructions that teams must follow before they can receive their next clue.
- Detour: A Detour is a choice between two tasks. Teams may choose either task and switch tasks if they find one option too difficult. There is usually one Detour present on each leg.
- Roadblock: A Roadblock is a task that only one team member can complete. Teams must choose which member will complete the task based on a brief clue they receive before fully learning the details of the task. There is usually one Roadblock present on each leg.
- Fast Forward: A Fast Forward is a task that only one team may complete, which allows that team to skip all remaining tasks on the leg and go directly to the next Pit Stop. Teams may only claim one Fast Forward during the entire race.
- U-Turn: Introduced this season, the U-Turn allows one team to force another team to complete both options of the Detour before they can continue the race. Teams may use the U-Turn only one time during the entire race.
- Speed Bump: The season introduced a new penalty for teams who were spared elimination by finishing in last place on a non-elimination leg, the Speed Bump. It required the team to complete an additional task in the following leg that only they had to complete.

Most teams who arrive last at the Pit Stop of each leg are progressively eliminated, while the first team to arrive at the finish line in the final episode wins the grand prize of US$1,000,000.

== Production ==
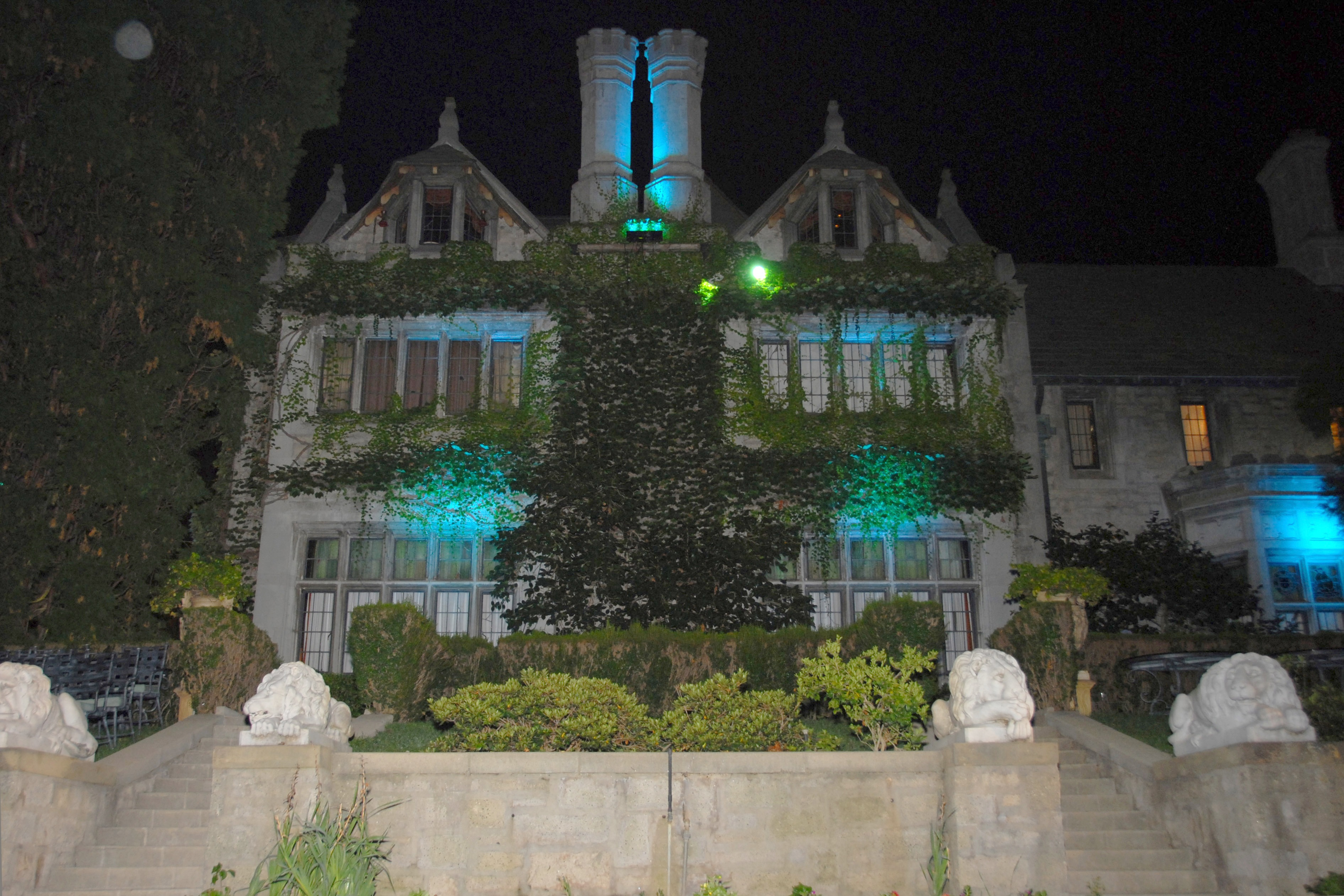
The starting line of The Amazing Race 12 was outside the Playboy Mansion in Los Angeles, California.

=== Development and filming ===
In May 2007, CBS announced that it had renewed The Amazing Race for its twelfth season, originally scheduled to air as a mid-season replacement of the 2007–08 United States network television schedule. This marked the first time since the sixth season that The Amazing Race was not included in CBS's initial fall television schedule, as the show had adopted a twice-yearly spring/fall schedule pattern since 2004 following poor ratings for season six. According to executive producer Bertram van Munster, the change had minimal affect on the season's production in comparison to the previous seasons. CBS later announced that after the cancellation of Viva Laughlin, The Amazing Race 12 would take its time slot, and began airing on November 4, 2007, earlier than originally intended. The finale aired on January 20, 2008. During the airing of the season, CBS announced that The Amazing Race was renewed for a thirteenth season.

The season was filmed in the summer of 2007, during a 21-day period between July 8 and July 29, after the airing of The Amazing Race 11 had concluded. The race's starting line was set outside the Playboy Mansion in Los Angeles, California. Its finish line was located in Girdwood, Alaska, making it the first time the finish was not located in the contiguous United States. The season saw teams travel approximately 30,000 miles during the competition, making it one of the shortest routes in the show's history. Van Munster explained that the shorter course was purely incidental given the countries visited. Teams raced through ten countries across four continents. New locales visited this season were Ireland, Burkina Faso, Croatia, Lithuania, and Taiwan. Preparation for a season typically takes between four and five months. When designing the season's challenges, van Munster wanted to ensure anyone could win the race no matter their age, so he tried to make the challenges a balance of mental and physical tasks. Michael McKay, executive producer of The Amazing Race Asia, revealed that while his production crew were filming The Amazing Race Asia 2, they crossed paths with the production team of The Amazing Race 12 in an airport.

The first five eliminated teams were sequestered at a villa in Portugal to await the finale. Subsequently, eliminated teams telephoned to inform the teams at the villa of their elimination, but continued to run the race as decoys to throw off potential spoilers. The sequestered teams met up with the decoy teams in the final destination city to cheer on the final three teams as they crossed the finish line. CBS posted short videos on its website after each episode aired in the Pacific Time Zone as part of its Elimination Station series, which showed the eliminated teams interacting at the villa.

At the Television Critics Association summer press tour in the following July, the show's then-executive producer Jonathan Littman stated that The Amazing Race 12 would be two episodes shorter than the previous season, and would remove non-elimination legs in an effort to "create more excitement". As there would be no non-elimination legs, the season was also set to have no penalties, which van Munster said would make The Amazing Race 12 fast-paced. In the seventh episode of the season, however, host Phil Keoghan revealed that there would be two non-elimination legs, one less than the usual three. This season introduced two new game mechanics to The Amazing Race: the U-Turn and the Speed Bump. A U-Turn allows one team to force another team to complete both options at the Detour before they can continue the race. The Speed Bump was a newly-introduced penalty which required teams that finished last on a non-elimination leg to complete an additional task in the following leg; other teams were not required to complete the additional task.

=== Casting ===
The cast consisted of eleven teams of two who each had a pre-existing relationship; five teams were married or dating, four were made up of family members, and two were teams of friends. Littman noted that the cast was generally younger than previous seasons. As the previous season was the show's first time bringing back previous contestants, van Munster was excited to film The Amazing Race 12, as it was a cast who were new to reality television and were unfamiliar with the "tricks of the trade". Two days after the series premiere, CBS launched a page dedicated to The Amazing Race on social networking site Facebook via Facebook Ads.

== Contestants ==
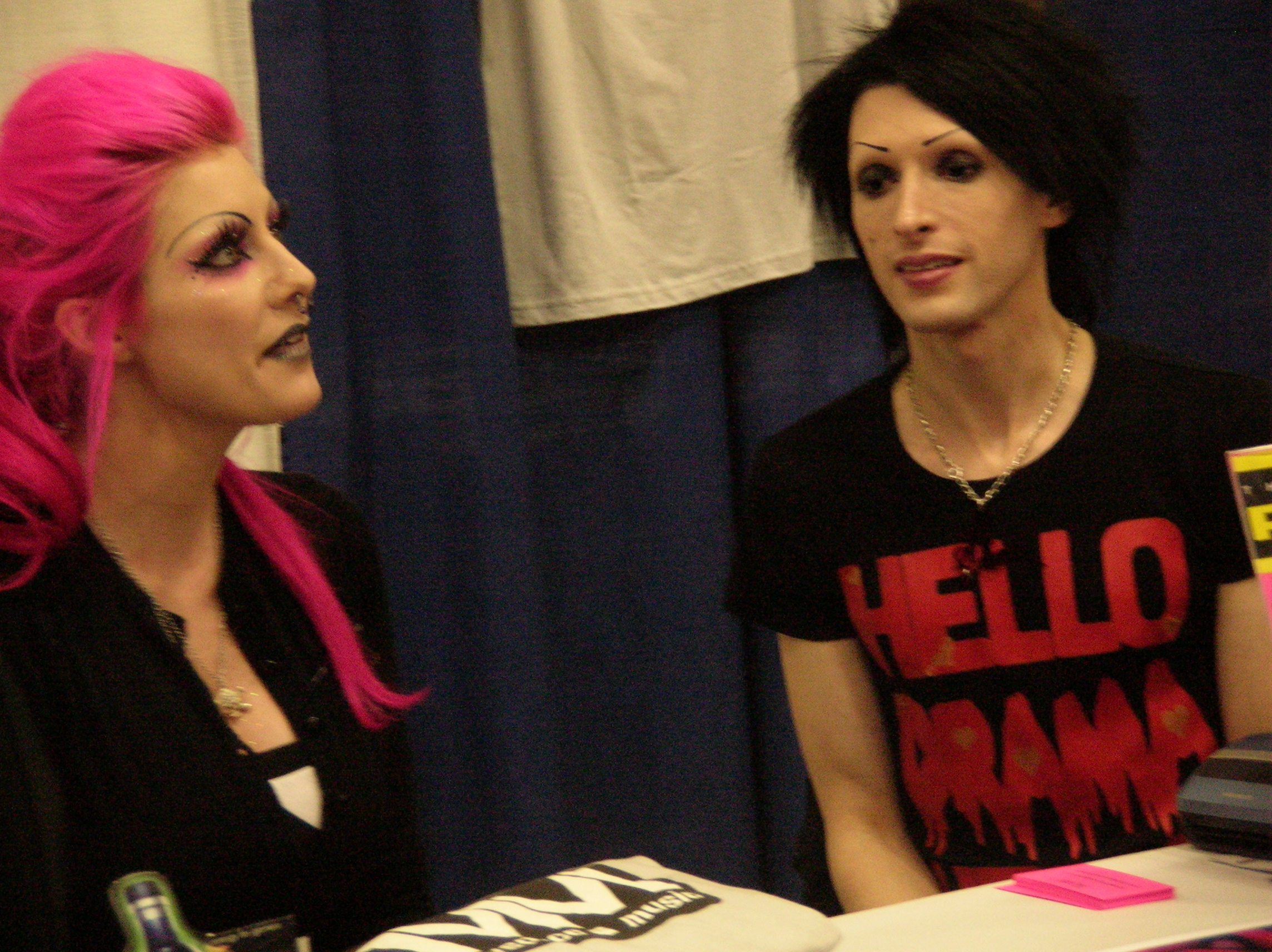
Vyxsin Fiala and Kynt Cothron

Contestants	Age	Relationship	Hometown	Status
Ari Bonias	21	Best Friends	Fountain Valley, California	Eliminated 1st (in Clifden, Ireland)
Staella Gianakakos	23	Best Friends	Fountain Valley, California	Eliminated 1st (in Clifden, Ireland)
Kate Lewis	49	Married Ministers	Thousand Oaks, California	Eliminated 2nd (in Durgerdam, Netherlands)
Pat Hendrickson	65	Married Ministers	Thousand Oaks, California	Eliminated 2nd (in Durgerdam, Netherlands)
Marianna Ruiz	25	Sisters	Miami, Florida	Eliminated 3rd (in Boulkiemdé, Burkina Faso)
Julia Ruiz	26	Sisters	Miami, Florida	Eliminated 3rd (in Boulkiemdé, Burkina Faso)
Lorena Segura	27	Dating	Sherman Oaks, California	Eliminated 4th (in Ouagadougou, Burkina Faso)
Jason Widener	33	Dating	Sherman Oaks, California	Eliminated 4th (in Ouagadougou, Burkina Faso)
Shana Wall	32	Friends	Los Angeles, California	Eliminated 5th (in Rumšiškės, Lithuania)
Jennifer McCall	32	Friends	Los Angeles, California	Eliminated 5th (in Rumšiškės, Lithuania)
Azaria Azene	27	Brother & Sister	New Orleans, Louisiana	Eliminated 6th (in Dubrovnik, Croatia)
Hendekea Azene	23	Brother & Sister	Torrance, California	Eliminated 6th (in Dubrovnik, Croatia)
Kynt Cothron	31	Dating Goths	Louisville, Kentucky	Eliminated 7th (in Mumbai, India)
Vyxsin Fiala	29	Dating Goths	Louisville, Kentucky	Eliminated 7th (in Mumbai, India)
Nathan Hagstrom	24	Dating	Fountain Valley, California	Eliminated 8th (in Taipei, Taiwan)
Jennifer Parker	23	Dating	Huntington Beach, California	Eliminated 8th (in Taipei, Taiwan)
Nicolas Fulks	23	Grandson & Grandfather	Chicago, Illinois	Third place
Donald Jerousek	68	Grandson & Grandfather	Elkhorn, Wisconsin	Third place
Ronald Hsu	58	Father & Daughter	Tacoma, Washington	Runners-up
Christina Hsu	26	Father & Daughter	Washington, D.C.	Runners-up
TK Erwin	22	Newly Dating	Huntington Beach, California	Winners
Rachel Rosales	23	Newly Dating	Huntington Beach, California	Winners

Future appearances

After the season ended, Kynt and Vyxsin applied for the third season of The Amazing Race Asia, but producer Michael McKay turned them down due to their prior Amazing Race experience. Their audition was shown on the "Racers Revealed" episode of the season. Kynt and Vyxsin, and Ronald and Christina, competed again on The Amazing Race: Unfinished Business. During the season, Christina Hsu revealed that she was engaged to Azaria Azene. They married in March 2011.

== Results ==
The following teams are listed with their placements in each leg. Placements are listed in finishing order.

- A red placement with a dagger (†) indicates that the team was eliminated.
- An underlined blue placement with a double-dagger (‡) indicates that the team was the last to arrive at a Pit Stop in a non-elimination leg, and had to perform a Speed Bump task in the following leg.
- A green ƒ indicates that the team won the Fast Forward.
- A brown ⊃ indicates that the team used the U-Turn; a brown ⊂ indicates the team on the receiving end of the U-Turn.

Team placement (by episode)
Team	1	2	3	4	5	6	7	8	9	10	11
TK & Rachel	3rd	6th	2nd	7th	1st	4th	4th	1st	4th‡	2nd	1st
Ronald & Christina	7th	9th	5th	3rd	3rd	1st	3rd	3rd	1st	1st	2nd
Nicolas & Donald	5th	8th	6th	4th	6th	5th	1stƒ	2nd	3rd	3rd	3rd
Nathan & Jennifer	10th	2nd	3rd	2nd	5th	3rd (Note: Nathan and Jennifer initially arrived 2nd, but did not take appropriate transportation to the Pit Stop. They had to go back to the end of the Detour and take a taxi back to the Pit Stop. Kynt and Vyxsin checked in during this time, dropping Nathan and Jennifer to 3rd.)	2nd	4th	2nd	4th†	
Kynt & Vyxsin	2nd	4th	4th	5th	2nd	2nd	5th‡	5th†			
Azaria & Hendekea	1st	5th	1st	1st	4th	6th†					
Shana & Jennifer	6th	3rd	7th	6th⊃ (Note: Shana and Jennifer chose to use the U-Turn on Lorena and Jason.)	7th†						
Lorena & Jason	4th	1st	8th	8th†⊂							
Marianna & Julia	9th	7th	9th†								
Kate & Pat	8th	10th†									
Ari & Staella	11th†										

== Race summary ==
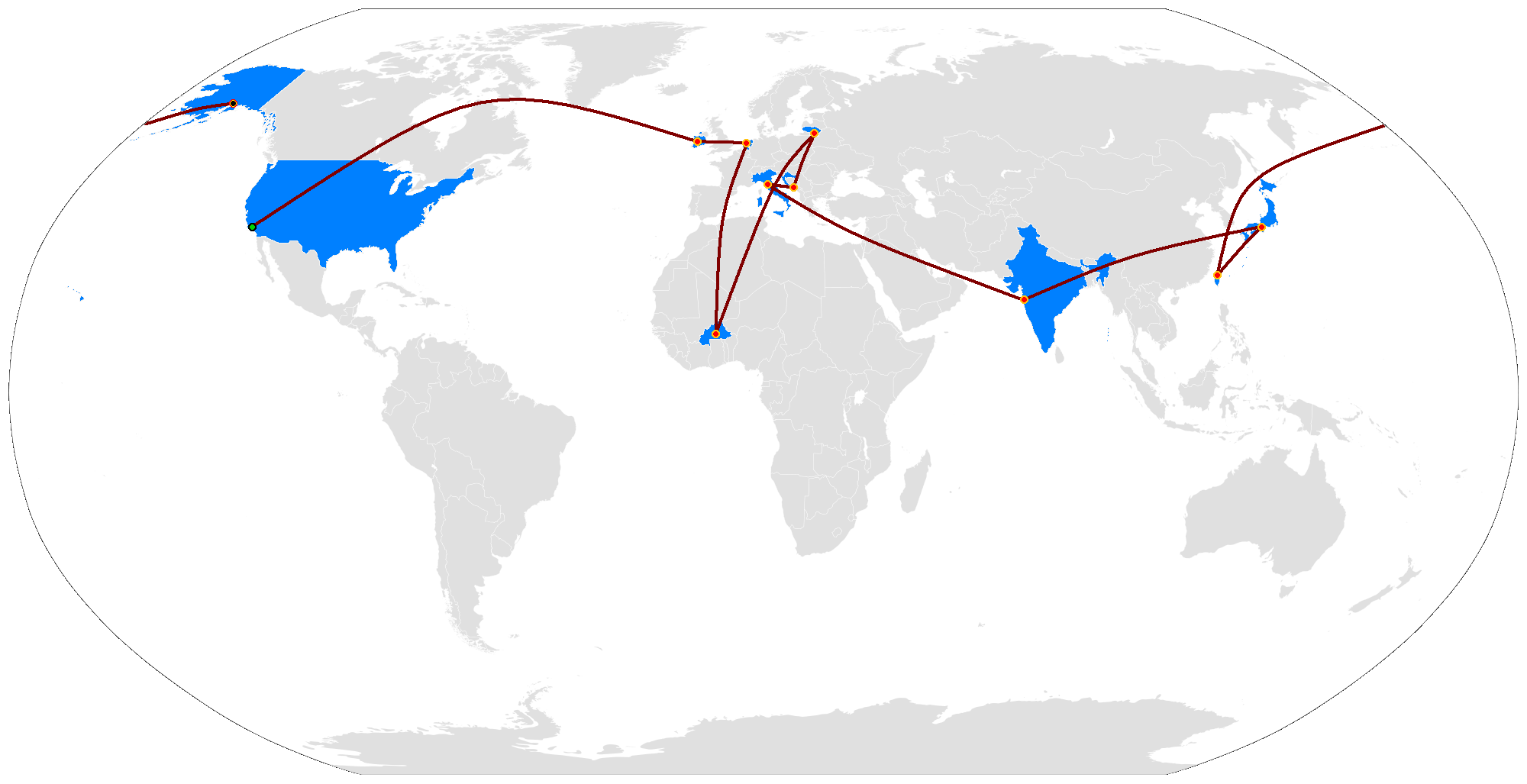
The route of The Amazing Race 12.

Destinations	Air travel Rail travel Water travel Bus travel Helicopter travel Bicycle travel Gondola travel
Route Markers	Detour Roadblock Fast Forward U-Turn Speed Bump Pit Stop

=== Leg 1 (United States → Ireland) ===
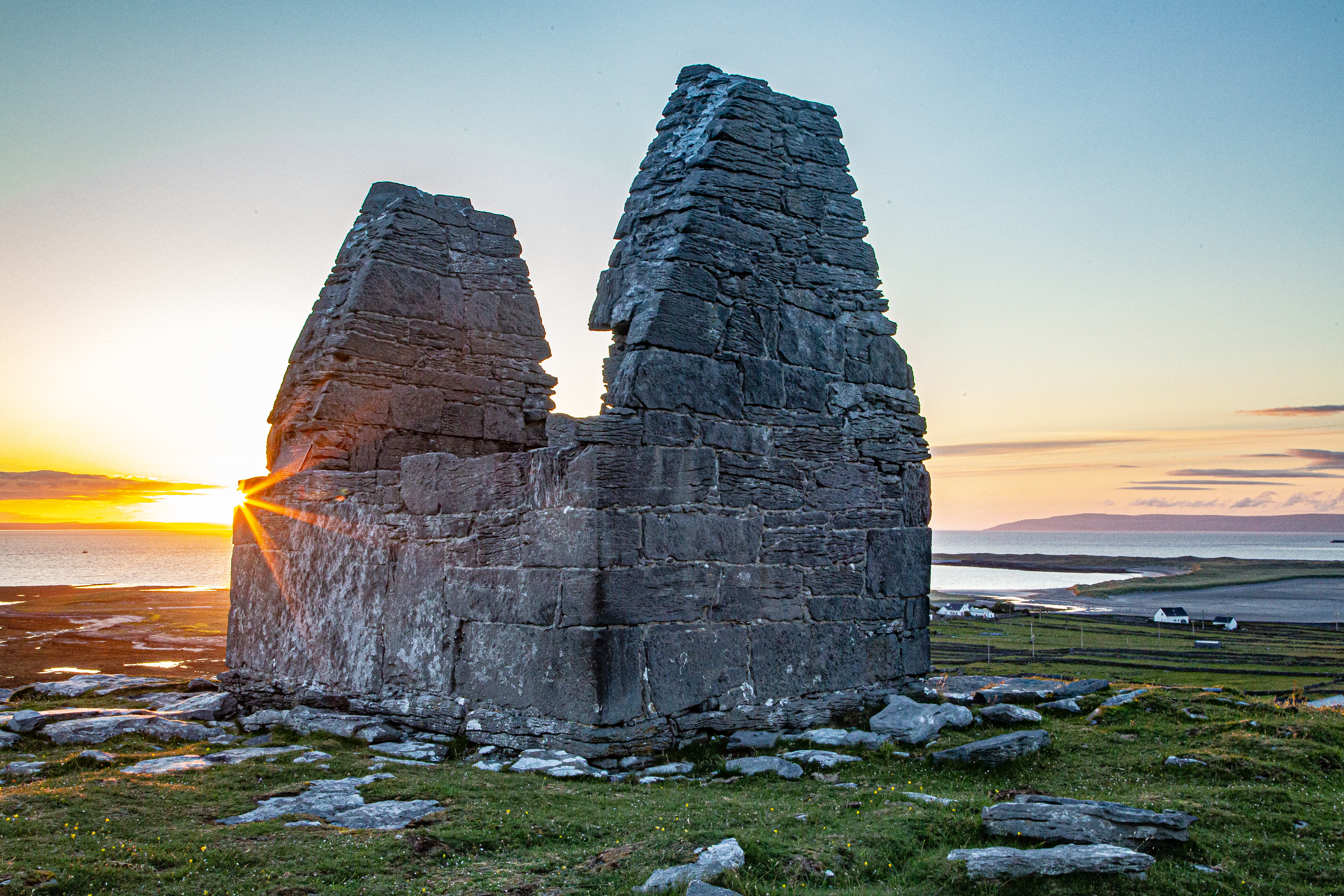
After arriving in Ireland, teams traveled to Teampall Bheanáin on Inishmore in the Aran Islands.

- Episode 1: "Donkeys Have Souls Too" (November 4, 2007)
- Prize: A trip for two to the Banff Springs Hotel in Alberta, Canada (awarded to Azaria and Hendekea)
- Eliminated: Ari and Staella

Locations

- Los Angeles, California (Playboy Mansion) (Starting Line)
- Los Angeles (Los Angeles International Airport) → Shannon, Ireland
- Rossaveal → Cill Rónáin
- Inishmore (Teampall Bheanáin)
- Cill Rónáin → Rossaveal (Rossaveal Ferry Port)
- Cleggan (Cleggan Farm)
- Clifden (Connemara Heritage and History Centre)

Episode summary

- Teams set off from the Playboy Mansion in Los Angeles, California, and drove to Los Angeles International Airport, where they had to book one of two flights to Shannon, Ireland. Five teams were booked on a British Airways flight scheduled to arrive 45 minutes earlier than an Aer Lingus flight that carried the remaining six teams. However, the British Airways flight was delayed during its connection in London, allowing the Aer Lingus flight to arrive in Shannon first. Once there, teams had to travel by ferry to the island of Inishmore and find the Teampall Bheanáin. At the church, teams had to sign up for one of three ferries departing the next morning.
- After returning to the Irish mainland, teams found a marked car with their next clue and had to drive themselves to Cleggan Farm. There, teams had to pedal a tandem bicycle along a dirt path to their next clue.
- In this season's first Roadblock, one team member had to pedal a high-wire bicycle across a ravine, suspended almost 200 feet (60 m) above the North Atlantic, in order to reach their next clue. Their partner, sitting eight feet (2.4 m) below, was taken along for the ride.
- After the Roadblock, teams had to choose a donkey, fill each of its baskets with 15 pieces of peat, and then walk the donkey back to the entrance of the farm to receive their next clue, which directed them to the Pit Stop: the Connemara Heritage and History Centre in Clifden.

=== Leg 2 (Ireland → Netherlands) ===
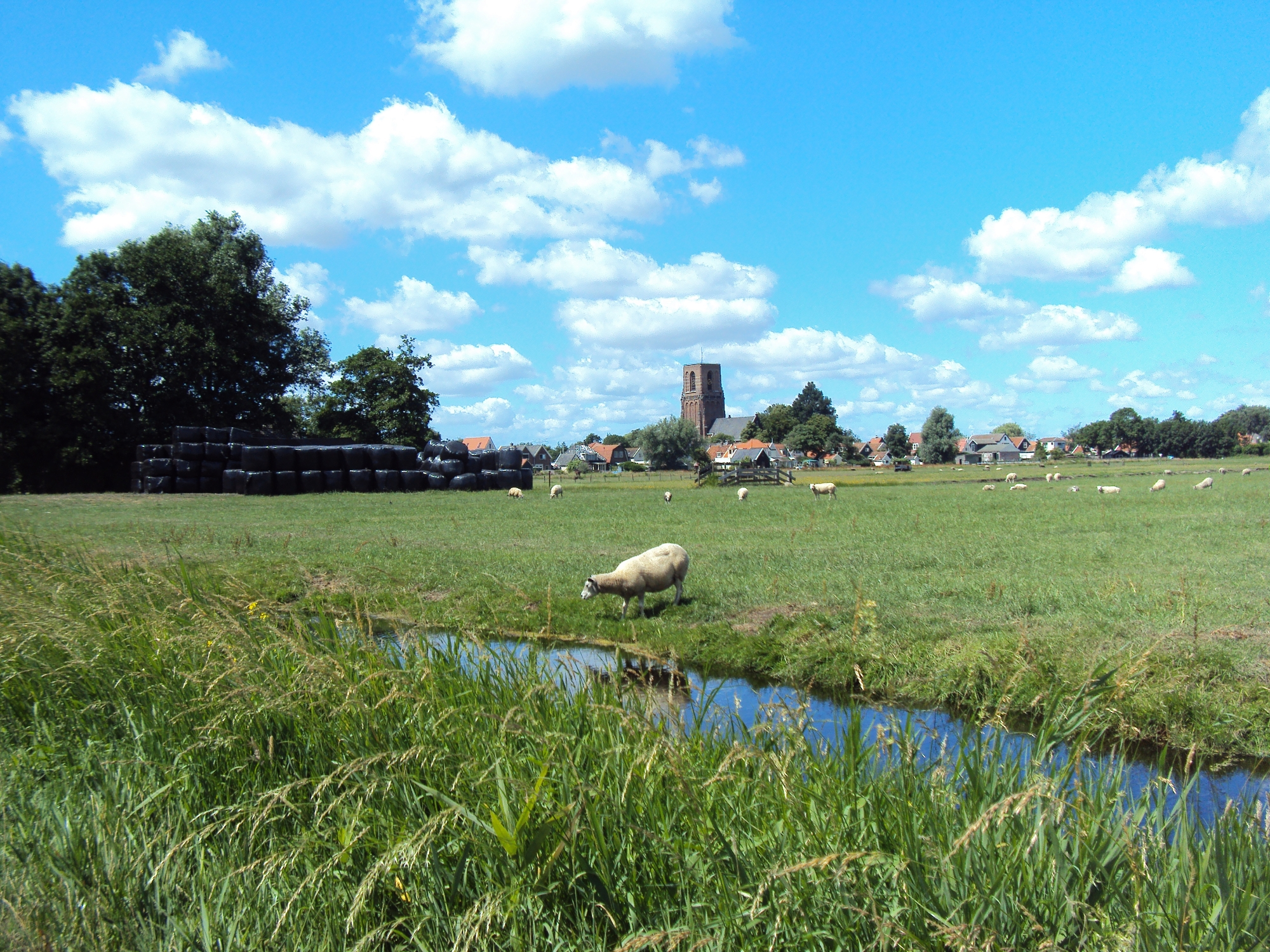
While in the Netherlands, teams went to the rural village of Ransdorp for the Roadblock.

- Episode 2: "I've Become the Archie Bunker of the Home" (November 11, 2007)
- Prize: A sport bike for each racer (awarded to Lorena and Jason)
- Eliminated: Kate and Pat

Locations

- Clifden (Connemara Heritage and History Centre)
- Shannon → Amsterdam, Netherlands
- Amsterdam (Amsterdam Centraal Station)
- Amsterdam (Melkmeisjesbrug)
- Amsterdam (Herengracht or Fietsflat)
- Amsterdam → Ransdorp (Rural Field)
- Durgerdam (Durgerdam Yacht Club)

Episode summary

- At the start of this leg, teams were instructed to fly to Amsterdam, Netherlands. Once there, teams had to travel by train to the Amsterdam Centraal Station and then search for their next clue on the Melkmeisjesbrug.
- This season's first Detour was a choice between Hoist It or Hunt It. In Hoist It, teams had to use a traditional rope-and-pulley system to hoist five pieces of furniture up to an apartment in order to receive their next clue. In Hunt It, teams had to travel on foot several blocks to the Fietsflat bicycle parking lot and search through thousands of bicycles for two tagged with the specific color designated in their clue. After finding their bicycles, teams had to ride them five miles (8.0 km) to an attendant, who gave them their next clue.
- After the Detour, teams had to travel by bus to a marked field in Ransdorp, where they found their next clue.
- In this leg's Roadblock, one team member had to play a sport called fierljeppen, which involved completing a 12-foot (3.7 m) vault across an irrigation ditch and landing on both feet in the marshy grass. Once racers completed the vault correctly, they could pick up their clue and vault back to their partner.
- After the Roadblock, teams had to ride cargo bikes known as a bakfiets to the Pit Stop: the Yacht Club in Durgerdam.

Additional note

- The fierljeppen task was later revisited in season 21 as a Switchback.

=== Leg 3 (Netherlands → Burkina Faso) ===
The Roadblock in Burkina Faso required one team member to milk a camel.

- Episode 3: "Please, Lord, Give Me Milk" (November 18, 2007)
- Prize: A vacation to Bermuda (awarded to Azaria and Hendekea)
- Eliminated: Marianna and Julia

Locations

- Durgerdam (Durgerdam Yacht Club)
- Amsterdam → Ouagadougou, Burkina Faso
- Ouagadougou (Gare de Ouagadougou) → Bingo
- Bingo (Village School)
- Bingo (Village Outskirts)

Episode summary

- At the start of this leg, teams were only told to fly to Ouagadougou, which they had to figure out was the capital of Burkina Faso. Once there, teams had to travel by taxi to the train station, where they found their next clue. Teams were directed to travel by train to Bingo and listen for their stop, as the town of Bingo did not have a physical station. After disembarking, teams had to search nearby for their next clue.
- In this leg's Roadblock, one team member had to milk a camel and collect the milk in a dried gourd. Once they had enough milk, they had to drink the milk in order to receive their next clue.
- After the Roadblock, teams had to lead four camels along a marked path to a group of nomads, where they found their next clue.
- This leg's Detour was a choice between Teach It or Learn It. In Teach It, teams had to teach a schoolchild, who did not speak English, ten English words. When a local teacher was satisfied that the child could recite the words, teams received their next clue. In Learn It, teams had to learn ten words in the local Moré language from a schoolchild and then recite the words in a test to a local teacher in order to receive their next clue.
- After the Detour, teams had to follow a marked path to the outskirts of Bingo and find the Pit Stop.

=== Leg 4 (Burkina Faso) ===
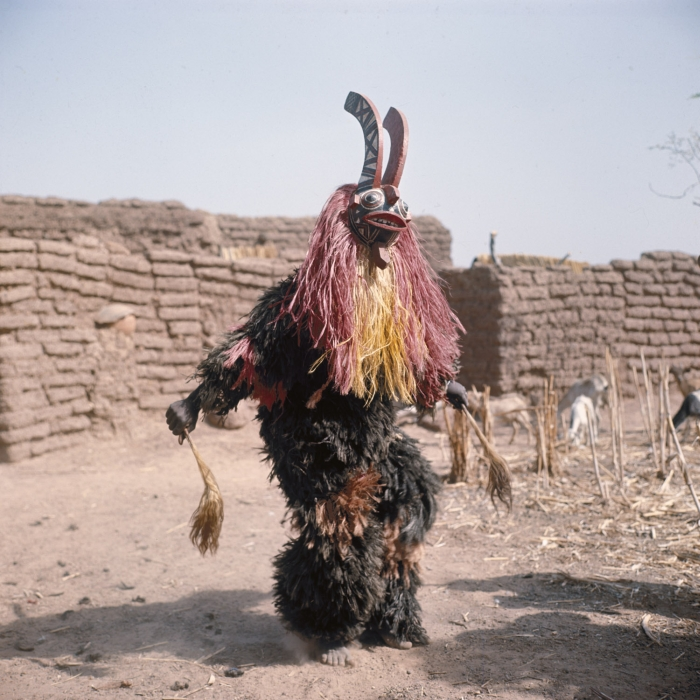
For one task of this leg's Detour, teams had to learn a traditional local dance and perform it with Winiama masked dancers.

- Episode 4: "Let's Name Our Chicken Phil" (November 25, 2007)
- Prize: A Yamaha Motor Scooter for each racer (awarded to Azaria and Hendekea)
- Eliminated: Lorena and Jason

Locations

- Bingo (Village Outskirts)
- Bingo (Village)
- Yako (Village Field)
- Yako (Pelegtanga Market)
- Ouagadougou (Tampouy Goat Market)
- Ouagadougou (Hôtel de Ville)

Episode summary

- At the start of this leg, teams had to follow a marked path to a tribal chief, who gave them their next clue, as well as a chicken that they had to carry with them throughout the entire leg. Teams then had to travel to a field in Yako, where they found their next clue.
- This leg's Detour was a choice between Shake Your Pans or Shake Your Booty. In Shake Your Pans, teams had to use traditional methods to pan for one troy ounce (31 g) of gold that they could trade for their next clue. In Shake Your Booty, teams had to learn a traditional local dance and perform it with Winiama masked dancers for a crowd of locals. Teams only had one attempt, and if the three judges felt that a team lacked creativity or had a bad performance, they incurred a ten-minute penalty. After successfully performing the dance or waiting out the penalty, teams received their next clue.
- After the Detour, teams had to travel along a marked path to the Pelegtanga Market in order to find their next clue. Teams then had to travel to the Tampouy Goat Market in Ouagadougou to find their next clue.
- In this leg's Roadblock, one team member had to load a large amount of cumbersome goods, including a small goat, onto a bicycle and then deliver the goods to a nearby market in order to receive their next clue, which directed them to the Pit Stop: the Hôtel de Ville.

Additional note

- Shana and Jennifer chose to use the U-Turn on Lorena and Jason.

=== Leg 5 (Burkina Faso → Lithuania) ===
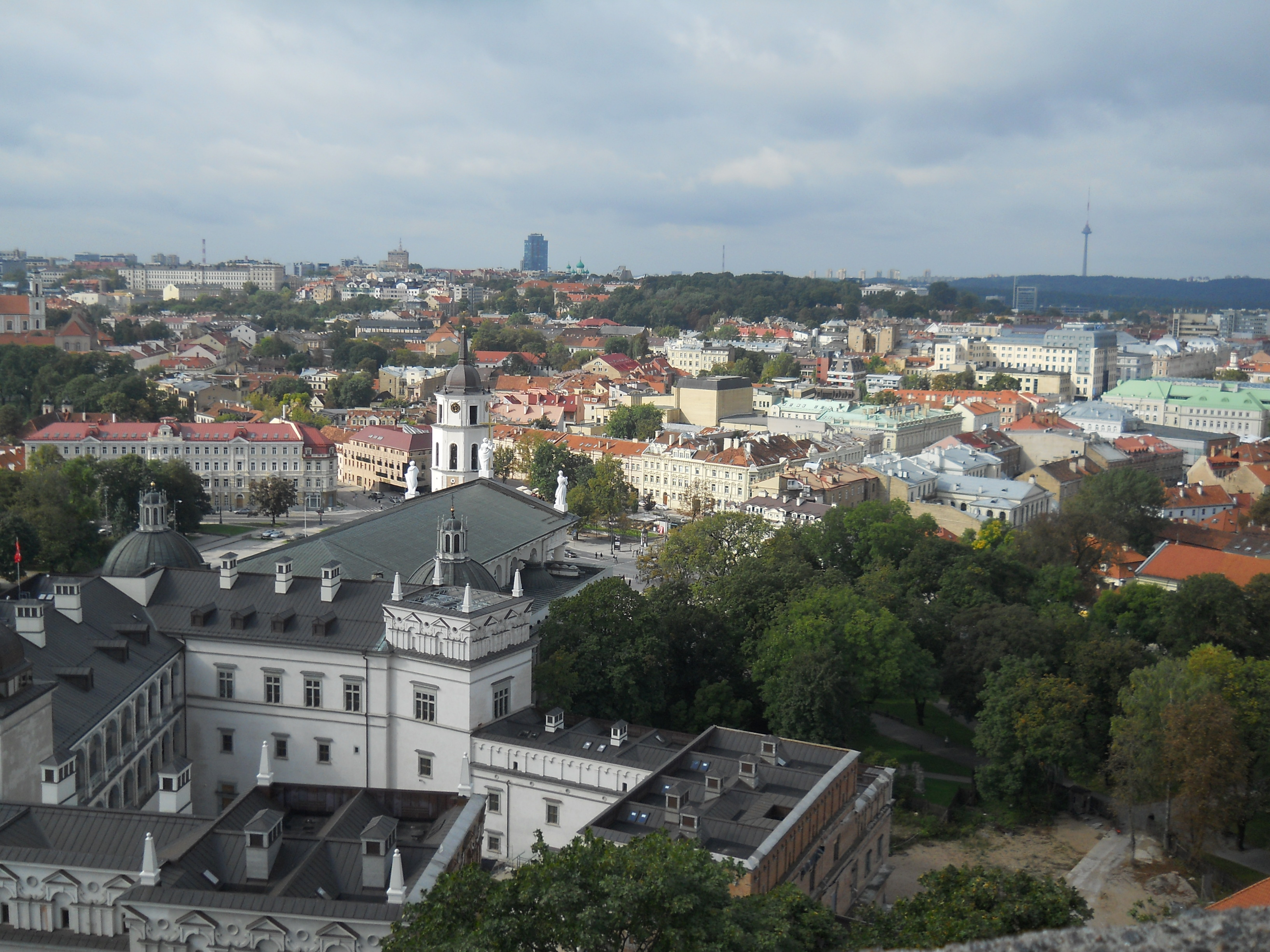
The Roadblock of this leg focused on the city of Vilnius, Lithuania.

- Episode 5: "We Really Burned Bridges, For Sure" (December 2, 2007)
- Prize: A trip for two to Japan (awarded to TK and Rachel)
- Eliminated: Shana and Jennifer

Locations

- Ouagadougou (Hôtel de Ville)
- Ouagadougou → Vilnius, Lithuania
- Trakai (Trakai Island Castle) (Unaired)
- Vilnius (St. Anne's Church)
- Vilnius (Old Town – Narutis Courtyard, Vilnius University Courtyard & Several Locations)
- Rumšiškės (Lithuanian Open Air Museum – Dzūkija Village)
- Rumšiškės (Lithuanian Open Air Museum – Račkiškės Chapel)
- Rumšiškės (Lithuanian Open Air Museum – Aukštaitija Windmill)

Episode summary

- At the start of this leg, teams were instructed to fly to Vilnius, Lithuania. Once there, teams had to drive to St. Anne's Church to find their next clue.
- In this leg's Roadblock, one team member had to choose a local Lithuanian woman working in the Narutis courtyard, who gave them a basket and told them whom to take it to the Vilnius University Courtyard. After traveling on foot through the confusing streets of the Vilnius Old Town and delivering their basket, they were then handed a book and one of four final destinations: Gabi Kavine, Saint Germain Restaurant, Hair Salon Sidabrynas, or the Shakespeare Hotel. When the delivery was made to the correct location, they received their next clue.
- After the Roadblock, teams had to drive to the Lithuanian Open Air Museum in Rumšiškės, where they had to search through the village for a Travelocity Roaming Gnome hidden among 100 common Lithuanian gnomes. When teams found a correct gnome, they had to follow a marked path to their next clue box at a chapel. Teams had to carry their gnome with them for the remainder of this leg.
- This leg's Detour at a traditional Midsummer's Festival was a choice between Count Down or Step Up. In Count Down, teams had to correctly count a marked section of picket fence and give their count to a villager in order to receive their next clue. In Step Up, both team members had to walk on stilts along a marked course to the finish line without falling in order to receive their next clue.
- After the Detour, teams had to check in at the Pit Stop: the Aukštaitija Windmill.

Additional notes

- Teams had to book tickets at an official airline ticketing office before being allowed to enter Ouagadougou Airport.
- After arriving in Vilnius, teams actually had to drive themselves to Trakai Island Castle in order to find their next clue, which directed them to St. Anne's Church. This task was unaired, and teams were shown driving to St. Anne's Church directly after arriving in Vilnius.

=== Leg 6 (Lithuania → Croatia) ===
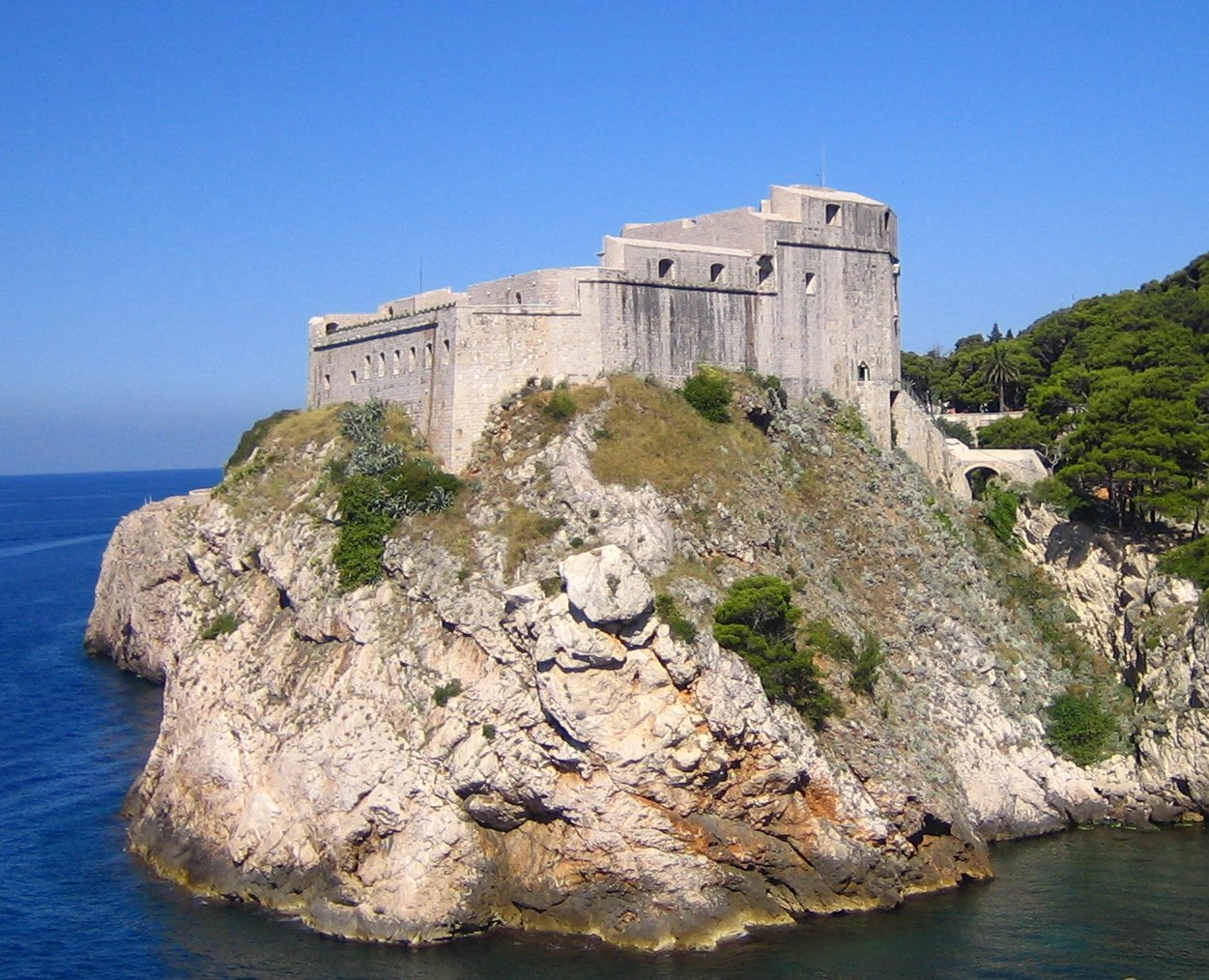
After arriving in Dubrovnik, teams visited the historic Fort of St. Lawrence for the Roadblock.

- Episode 6: "Cherry on Top of the Sundae That's Already Melted" (December 9, 2007)
- Prize: A catamaran for each racer (awarded to Ronald and Christina)
- Eliminated: Azaria and Hendekea

Locations

- Rumšiškės (Lithuanian Open Air Museum – Aukštaitija Windmill)
- Vilnius → Dubrovnik, Croatia
- Dubrovnik (Fort of St. Lawrence)
- Dubrovnik (Walls of Dubrovnik – Fort Bokar)
- Dubrovnik (Trg Oružja)
- Dubrovnik (Fort Imperial – Stone Cross)

Episode summary

- At the start of this leg, teams were instructed to fly to Dubrovnik, Croatia. Once there, teams had to travel to the base of the Fort of St. Lawrence to find their next clue.
- In this leg's Roadblock, one team member had to find one of eight stones out of 150 that could fit into the rock wall at the fort being rebuilt from the Croatian War of Independence in order to receive their next clue.
- After the Roadblock, teams had to go to the Fort of St. Lawrence's roof and ride a zip-line down to Fort Bokar in order to receive their next clue.
- This leg's Detour was a choice between Short & Long or Long & Short. In Short & Long, teams had to rappel down the walls of Fort Bokar and follow a marked path to a wall, where they had to finish assembling a rope ladder that they could use to scale the wall. They then had to travel on foot a long distance through the confusing old-quarter streets to Trg Oružja in order to find their next clue. In Long & Short, teams had to tandem zip-line from the fort, swim to a floating platform, and then row a fishing boat around the city walls to a flagged harbor. They then had to travel on foot a short distance to Trg Oružja in order to find their next clue.
- After the Detour, teams had to check in at the Pit Stop: the stone cross at Fort Imperial.

=== Leg 7 (Croatia → Italy) ===
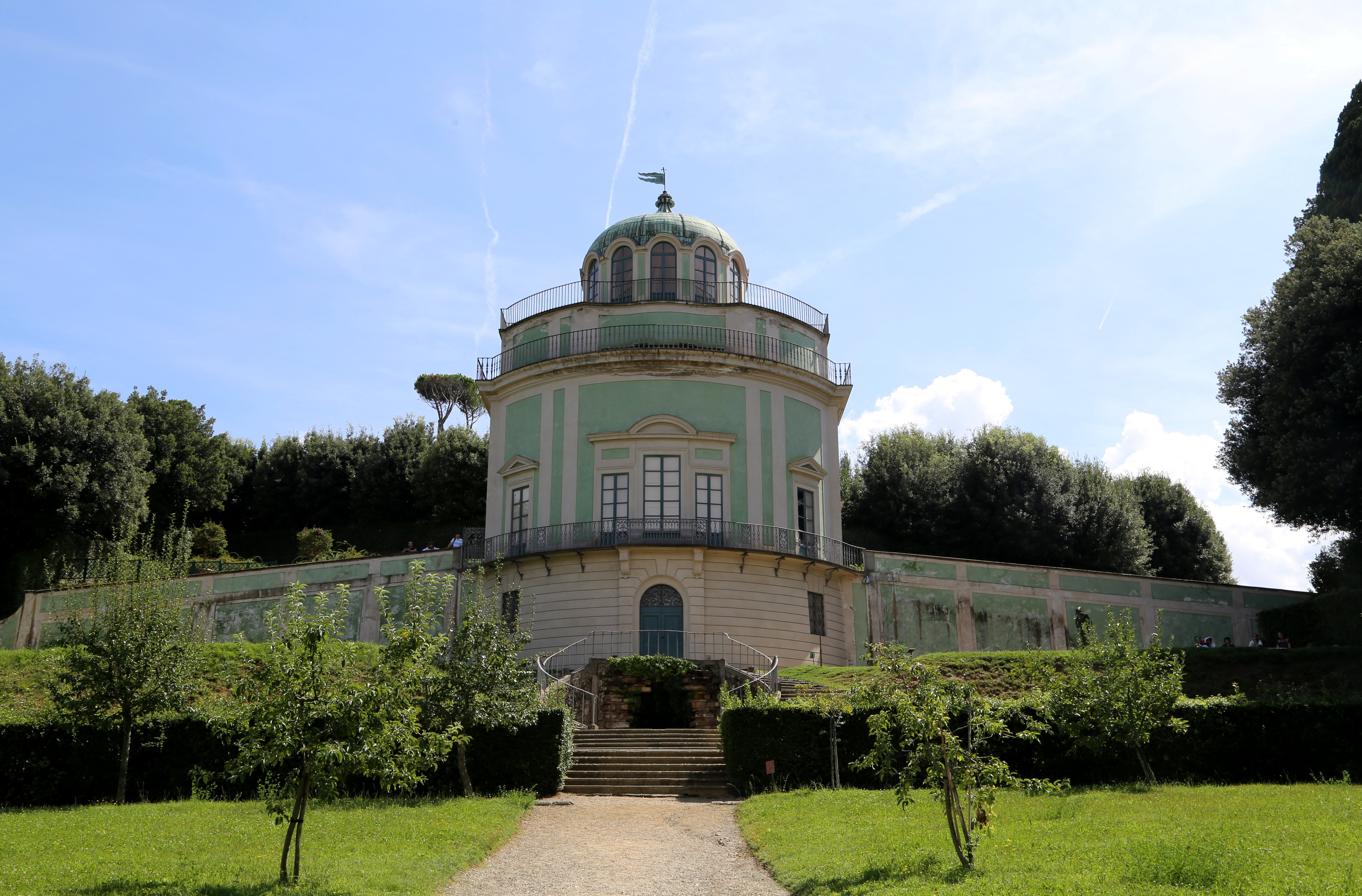
Teams ended this leg at the Boboli Gardens in Florence.

- Episode 7: "This is Forever, Now" (December 23, 2007)
- Prize: A trip for two to Cancún, Mexico (awarded to Nicolas and Donald)

Locations

- Dubrovnik (Fort Imperial – Stone Cross)
- Dubrovnik → Split
- Split → Ancona, Italy (Ancona Ferry Terminal)
- Empoli (Campo di Volo Silvano Poli)
- Empoli (Fabio Studio)
- Vinci (Da Vinci Birthplace)
- Vinci (Da Vinci Birthplace or Piazza Guido Masi)
- Florence (Boboli Gardens)

Episode summary

- At the start of this leg, teams were instructed to travel by bus to Split, and then by ferry to Ancona, Italy, where they found their next clue. Teams then had to drive to the Campo di Volo Silvano Poli in Empoli, where they found their next clue. Teams also received a BlackBerry, which gave them a message from their loved ones at home.
- In this leg's Roadblock, one team member had to fly over Tuscany in an ultralight and scan a six-mile (10 km) radius of the countryside for the name of their next destination: Vinci. If team members thought they spotted the word, they had to signal their pilot to land. Once on the ground, they had to tell the instructor the word, and if they were correct, he handed them their next clue. There was a thirty-minute time limit per flight, after which the ultralight had to land for refueling.
- In this season's only Fast Forward, one team had to drive to Fabio Studio and have a permanent tattoo inked onto their arms: the letters ƒƒ. Nicolas and Donald won the Fast Forward.
- After the Roadblock, teams had to drive to Vinci and find their next clue outside the birthplace of Leonardo da Vinci.
- This leg's Detour was a choice between Invention or Tradition. In Invention, teams traveled to a nearby courtyard and chose a replica of a crane designed by Leonardo da Vinci. They had to first assemble the crane and then use it to lift a large stone one foot (30 cm) off the ground. They then had to place a mirror underneath in order to read the clue printed on the bottom of the stone. In Tradition, teams traveled to the Piazza Guido Masi, where they had to learn and correctly perform a traditional local flag throwing routine in order to receive a flag displaying the name of their next destination.
- After the Detour, teams had to check in at the Pit Stop: the Boboli Gardens in Florence.

Additional note

- This was a non-elimination leg.

=== Leg 8 (Italy → India) ===
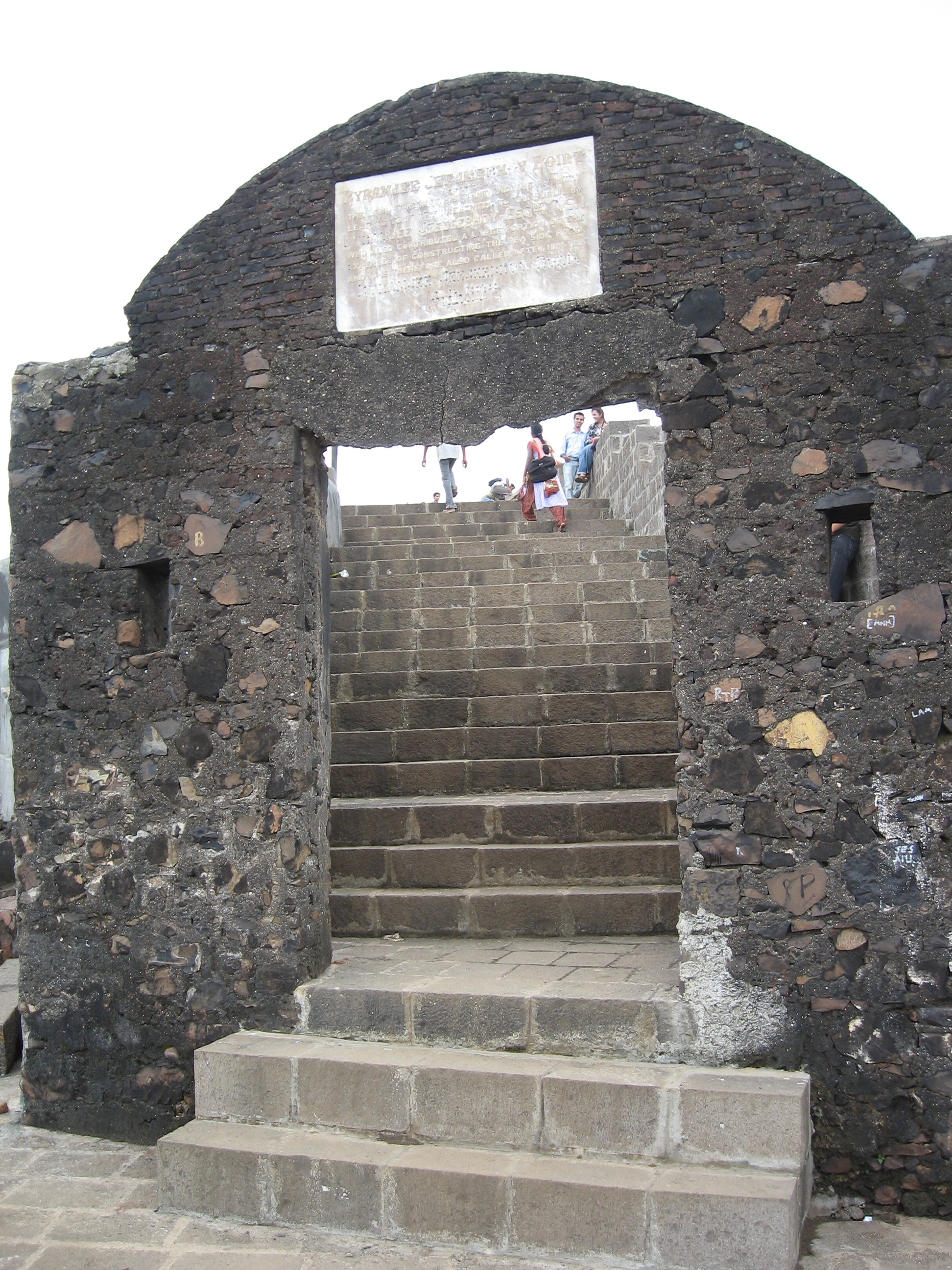
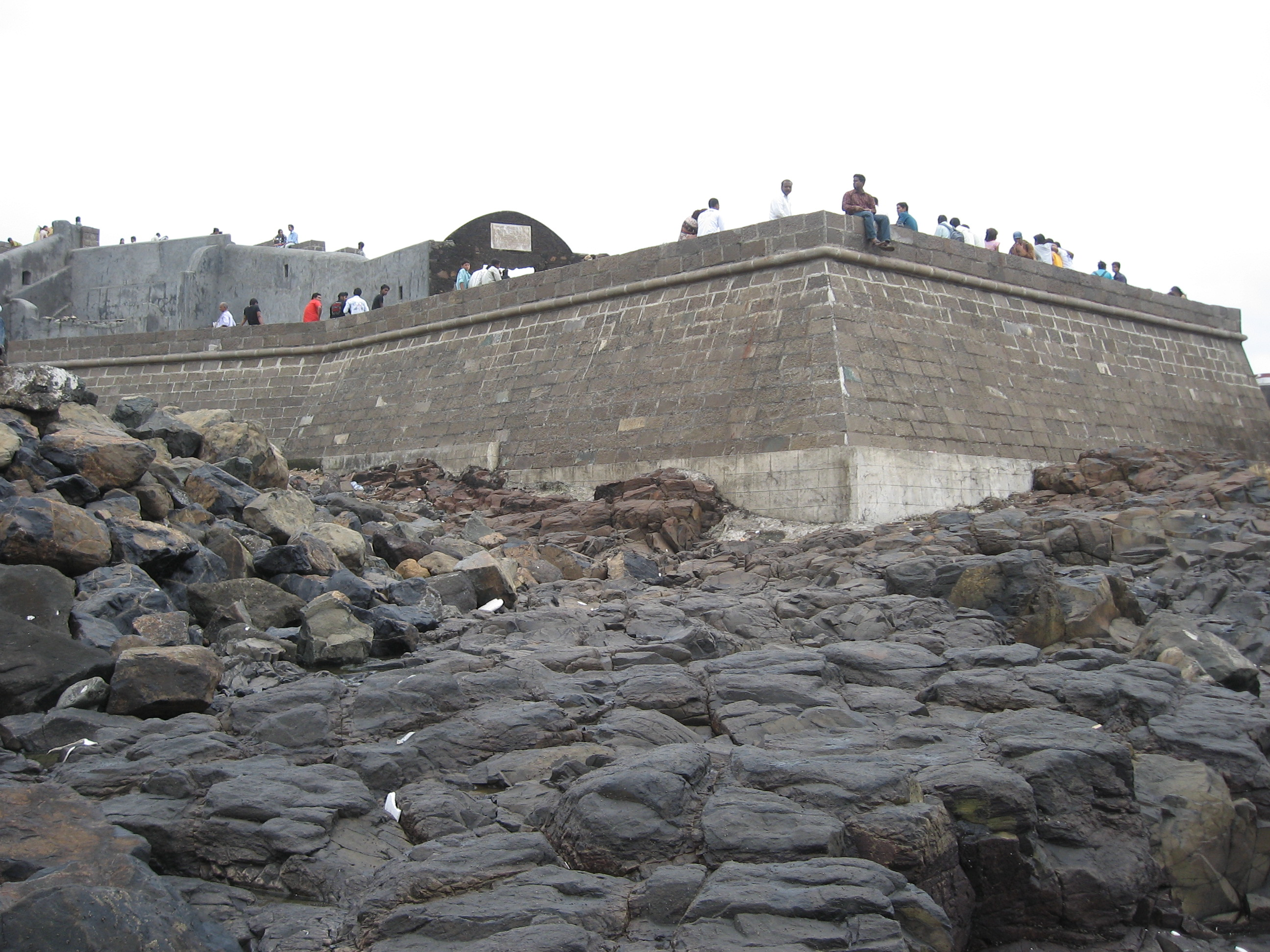
Bandra Fort, a Portuguese fort on the shoreline of Mumbai, served as the Pit Stop of this leg.
- Episode 8: "Honestly, They Have Witch Powers or Something!" (December 30, 2007)
- Prize: A trip for two to Saint Martin (awarded to TK and Rachel)
- Eliminated: Kynt and Vyxsin

Locations

- Florence (Boboli Gardens)
- Florence → Mumbai, India
- Mumbai (Khar Danda – M.R. Naik Newspaper Stall)
- Mumbai (Chauhan Alteration Tailors)
- Mumbai (Dariya Mahal)
- Mumbai (Dadar West Bridge or Dadar Flower Market)
- Mumbai (Kabutar Khana)
- Mumbai (Colaba – Bharatgas Colaba Gas Service)
- Mumbai (Bandra – Bandra Fort)

Episode summary

- At the start of this leg, teams were instructed to fly to Mumbai, India. Once there, teams had to find the M.R. Naik Newspaper Stall and then had search for an advertisement in The Times of India, which instructed them to travel by auto rickshaw to Chauhan Alteration Tailors to receive their next clue.
- For their Speed Bump, Kynt and Vyxsin had to find the yoga master at Dariya Mahal and successfully perform a series of yoga poses before they could continue racing.
- This leg's Detour was a choice between Paste 'Em or Thread 'Em. In Paste 'Em, teams had to travel to a marked underpass beneath the Dadar West Bridge and use provided supplies to properly paste a six-panel Bollywood movie poster onto the wall in order to receive their next clue. In Thread 'Em, teams had to travel to the Dadar Flower Market, find a marked flower stall, and create a traditional wedding garland by threading 108 flowers in a particular pattern. When the judge approved the garland, teams had to deliver it to a nearby bridegroom, who gave them their next clue.
- After the Detour, teams had to travel to Kabutar Khana, where they found their next clue. Teams then had to travel to the Bharatgas Colaba Gas Service in order to find their next clue.
- In this leg's Roadblock, one team member had to load a bicycle cart with six tanks of propane gas, pedal to two addresses listed on their order slips, deliver three tanks to each address, and collect receipts as proof of delivery. Once their deliveries were complete, they had to hand their two order slips and receipts to the foreman in order to receive their next clue, which directed them to the Pit Stop: Bandra Fort.

Additional note

- Kynt and Vyxsin attempted to use the U-Turn on Nicolas and Donald; however, Nicolas and Donald had already passed the U-Turn by this point and were therefore unaffected.

=== Leg 9 (India → Japan) ===
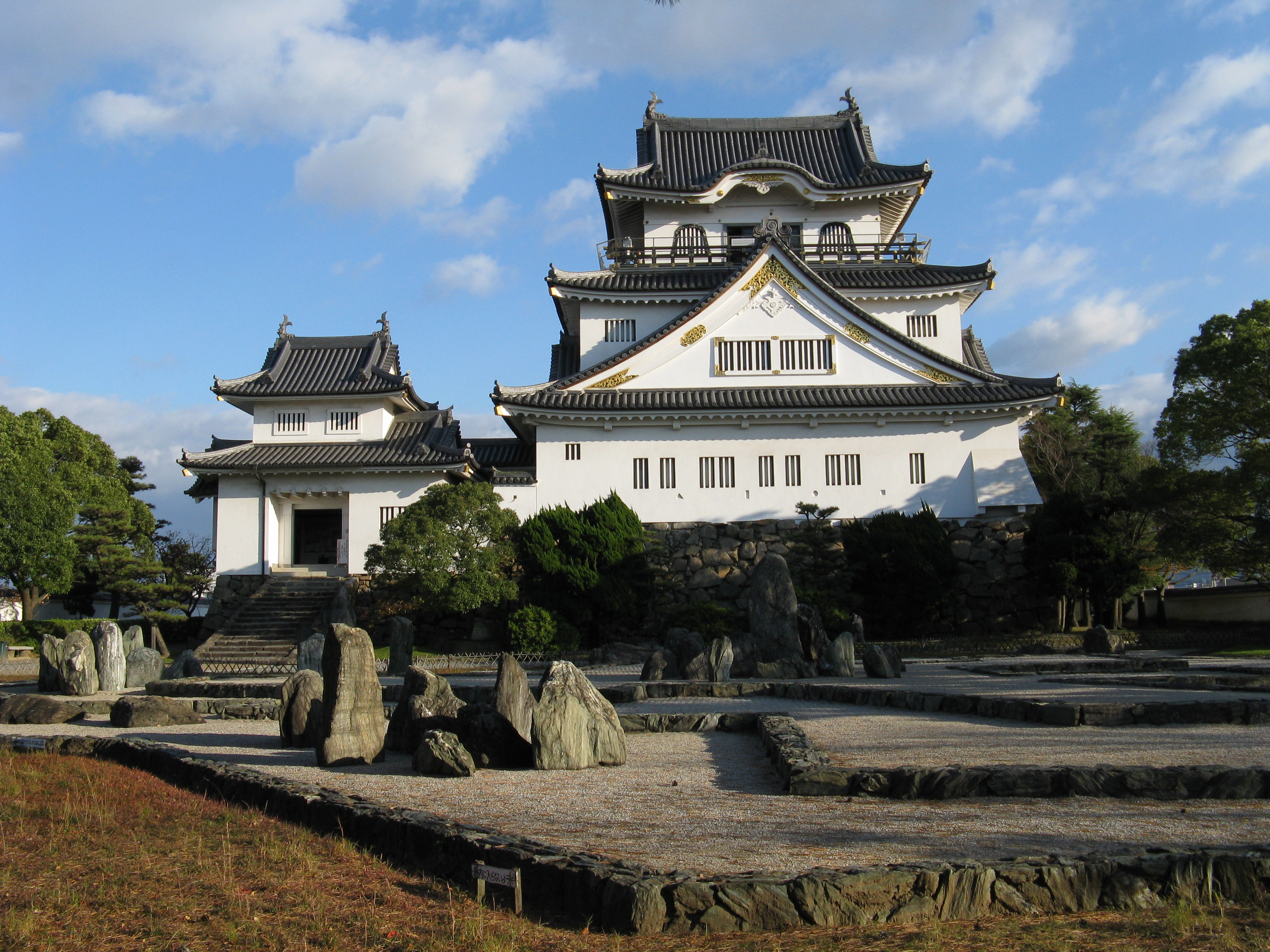
After arriving in Osaka, teams visited Kishiwada Castle to find a clue.

- Episode 9: "I Just Hope He Doesn't Croak on Us" (January 6, 2008)
- Prize: An electric car for each racer (awarded to Ronald and Christina)

Locations

- Mumbai (Bandra – Bandra Fort)
- Mumbai → Osaka, Japan
- Kishiwada (Kishiwada Castle)
- Osaka (JR Noda Station & Osaka Central Post Office)
- Osaka (Kita-Mido Temple)
- Osaka (Shimojima Building or Saera Flower Shop)
- Osaka (Tempozan Park)

Episode summary

- At the start of this leg, teams were instructed to fly to Osaka, Japan. Once there, teams had to travel to Kishiwada Castle and search the grounds for their next clue, which directed teams to the Noda Station. There, teams had to locate a janitor inside the terminal, who handed them their next clue.
- In this leg's Roadblock, one team member had to drive a Japanese couple five miles (8 km) in a taxicab through a maze of confusing one-way streets to a specified address written in Japanese: the Osaka Central Post Office. They could stop and ask for directions, but could not invite a local to lead them or join them in the car, nor could the couple help them. Once racers arrived at the post office, the couple handed them their next clue; however, they had to return to their teammate before they could read the clue.
- After the Roadblock, teams had to travel by taxi to Kita-Mido Temple to find their next clue.
- This leg's Detour was a choice between Sense of Touch or Sense of Smell. In Sense of Touch, teams traveled on foot to the Shimojima Building and had to use miniature robots, controlled by cell phones, to play a game of soccer against two robotic defenders. Once each team member scored a goal, the referee gave them their next clue. In Sense of Smell, teams traveled on foot to the Saera Flower Shop, which only sold artificial flowers. Once there, they had to use only their noses to find one real flower, hidden amongst thousands of artificial flowers, in order to receive their next clue.
- After the Detour, teams had to check in at the Pit Stop: Tempozan Park.

Additional note

- This was a non-elimination leg.

=== Leg 10 (Japan → Taiwan) ===
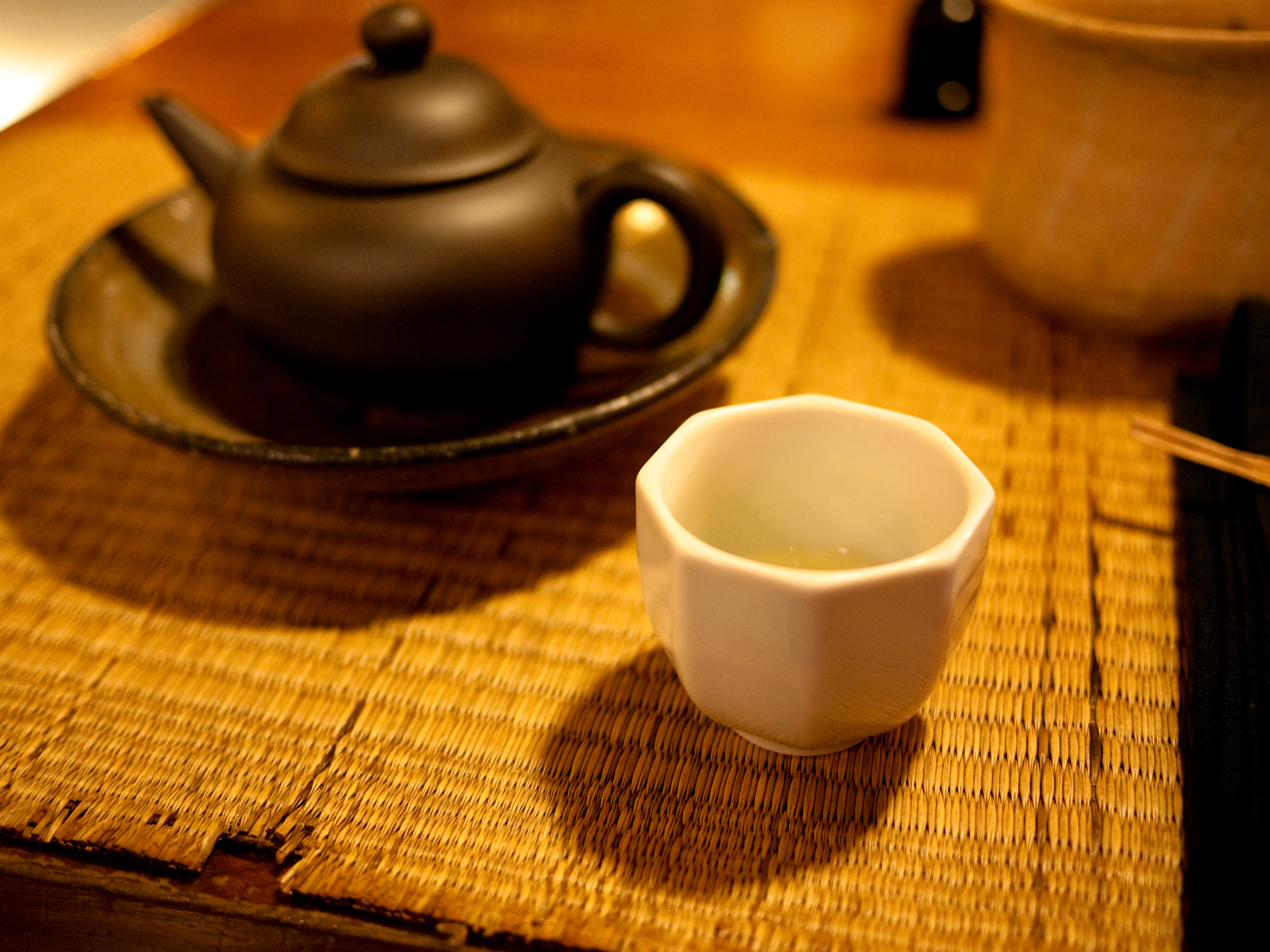
While in Taipei, teams drank a cup of tea, which had a clue written underneath in Chinese.

- Episode 10: "Sorry, Guys, I'm Not Happy to See You" (January 13, 2008)
- Prize: A five-night vacation to Curaçao (awarded to Ronald and Christina)
- Eliminated: Nathan and Jennifer

Locations

- Osaka (Tempozan Park)
- Osaka (Umeda Sky Building – Floating Garden)
- Osaka → Taipei, Taiwan
- Taipei (Taipei Main Station)
- Taipei → Taichung
- Jiji (Acrobatics Jeep)
- Jiji (Heping Elementary School)
- Taichung → Taipei
- Taipei (GK Teahouse)
- Taipei (Gong Guan Night Market)
- Taipei (Youth Park)
- Taipei (Chiang Kai-shek Memorial Hall)

Episode summary

- At the start of this leg, teams were instructed to travel to the Umeda Sky Building, take an elevator to the Floating Garden, and search for their next clue. They were then instructed to fly to Taipei, Taiwan. Once there, teams had to travel to Taipei Main Station to search outside the station for their next clue, which instructed them to travel by train to Taichung and then taxi to Acrobatics Jeep in Jiji. There, they found their next clue.
- In this leg's Roadblock, one team member had to ride in a car driven by a professional stunt driver, who maneuvered the vehicle onto a giant teeter-totter and then rocked back and forth precariously 25 feet (7.5 m) above the ground. Afterwards, they switched to an amphibious car, donned a pair of goggles, and had to hold their breath while they were driven underwater for seventeen seconds before receiving their next clue.
- For their Speed Bump, TK and Rachel had to find Heping Elementary School, don protective gear, run through a barrage of fireworks, and then get doused with water before they could continue racing.
- After the Roadblock, teams had to travel by train back to Taipei and find the GK Teahouse. There, each team member had to drink a cup of tea and find their next clue written in Chinese on the bottom of the teacup, which directed them to search the Gong Guan Night Market for a clown, who had their next clue.
- This leg's Detour was a choice between Fire or Earth. In Fire, teams would have traveled to Zhongzheng Park to participate in a mystical Chinese ritual by writing messages of luck on Kongming lanterns. Once a team had sent twenty lanterns into the air, they would have received their next clue. In Earth, teams traveled to Youth Park, where they had to walk barefoot down a 220-foot (67 m) path made of jagged stones, turn around, and then walk back to the start in order to receive their next clue. All teams chose Earth.
- After the Detour, teams had to check in at the Pit Stop: Chiang Kai-shek Memorial Hall.

=== Leg 11 (Taiwan → United States) ===
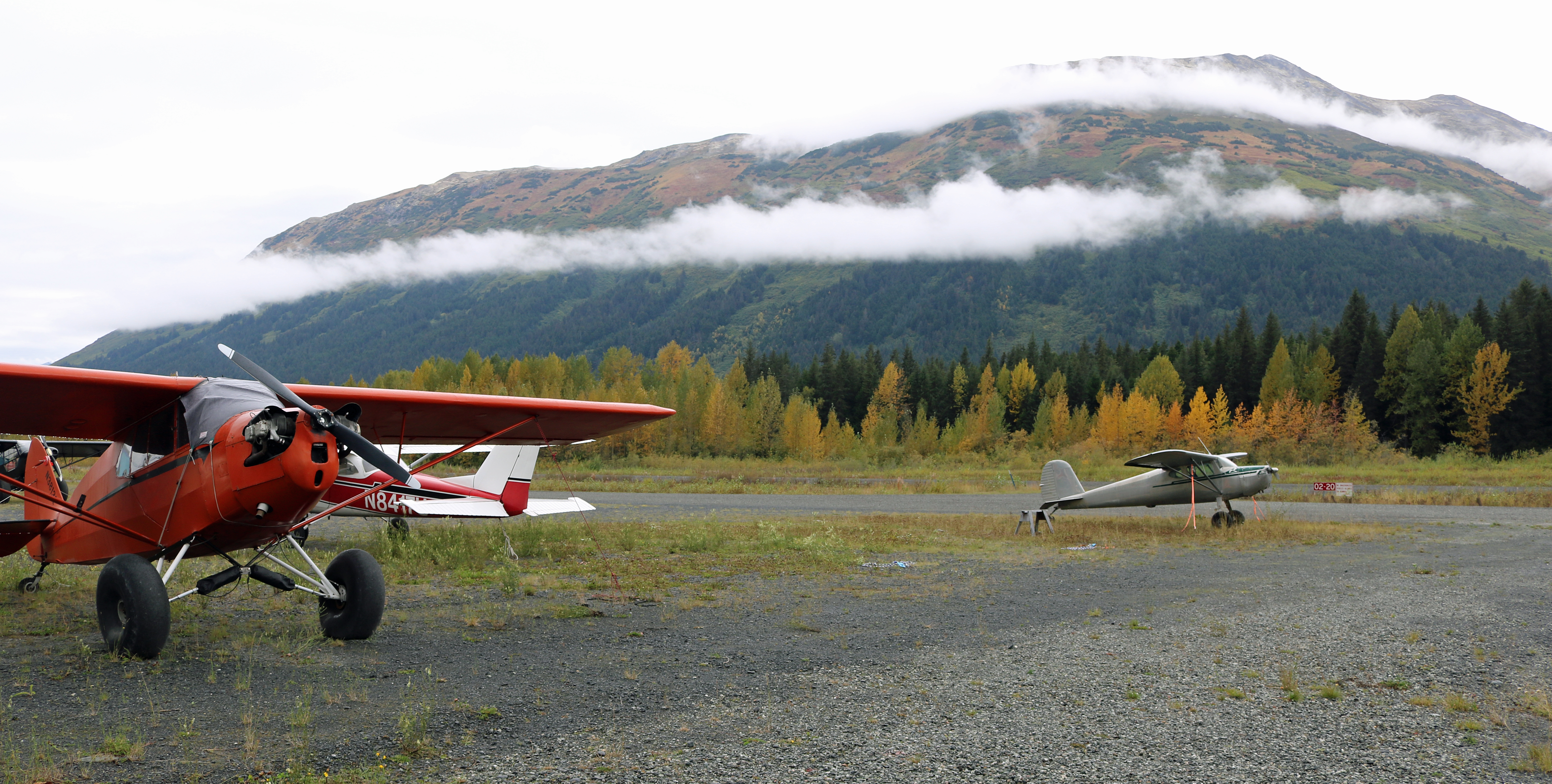
After a final leg in Anchorage, Alaska, teams crossed the finish line at Girdwood Airport.

- Episode 11: "The Final Push" (January 20, 2008)
- Prize: US$1,000,000
- Winners: TK and Rachel
- Runners-up: Ronald and Christina
- Third place: Nicolas and Donald

Locations

- Taipei (Chiang Kai-shek Memorial Hall)
- Taipei → Anchorage, Alaska
- Anchorage (6th Avenue Outfitters)
- Anchorage (Ship Creek Boat Launch)
- Anchorage (Twentymile River → Twenty-Mile Glacier)
- Anchorage (Twenty-Mile Glacier → Merrill Field)
- Anchorage (Goose Lake Park)
- Anchorage (Resolution Park – Captain Cook Statue)
- Anchorage (Alaska Center for the Performing Arts – Salmon Hooker Statue)
- Girdwood (Girdwood Airport)

Episode summary

- At the start of this leg, teams were instructed to fly to Anchorage, Alaska. Once there, teams had to find 6th Avenue Outfitters, where they picked up the gear they would need for this leg along with their next clue. They then traveled to the Ship Creek Boat Launch, where they found their next clue.
- This season's final Detour was a choice between Cut the Cod or Grab the Crab. In Cut the Cod, teams had to cut through several 50-pound (23 kg) lingcod and search for a miniature clue hidden inside one of the fish. In Grab the Crab, teams had to jump into the hold of a boat swarming with over 500 live crabs. They then had to search through the crabs for one marked with Amazing Race colors in order to receive their next clue.
- After the Detour, teams traveled to the Twentymile River, where they took a high-speed boat to the Twenty-Mile Glacier. Once there, both team members had to climb a wall of ice in order to reach their next clue. Teams were instructed to travel via helicopter to Merrill Field and then by taxi to Goose Lake Park in order to find their next clue.
- In this season's final Roadblock, one team member entered a field full of objects that they had encountered along the racecourse. They had to match 10 of 15 recognizable items to their respective legs, but the combination of items had to meet the following requirements. Only one combination of items satisfied the conditions and opened the clue box, allowing racers to retrieve their next clue.
  - Three items had to be animals or animal byproducts.
  - One had to be a U-Turn.
  - Two had to be items either at or brought to a Pit Stop.
  - Two had to be items of transportation with wheels, one of which was used at a Detour.
  - One had to be an item of transportation resembling the shape of a stick.

Leg	Country	Objects
1	Ireland	Tandem Bicycle
2	Netherlands	Bicycle
3	Burkina Faso	Camel Milk
4	Burkina Faso	Chicken
5	Lithuania	Stilts
6	Croatia	Croatian Gun
7	Italy	BlackBerry
8	India	U-Turn Board
9	Japan	Janitor
10	Taiwan	Tea

- After the Roadblock, teams were told to travel to "Cook's Eye View of the Sleeping Lady", which referred to the Captain Cook Statue at Resolution Park. There, teams found their next clue. Teams then had to search on foot for the Salmon Hooker Statue at the Alaska Center for the Performing Arts, where they found their final clue directing them to the finish line at Girdwood Airport.

== Reception ==
The Amazing Race 12 received mostly positive reviews. After the first episode concluded, Andy Dehnart of Reality Blurred praised the season's cast, writing: "This season’s group managed to deliver yet again by being alternately entertaining, obnoxious, delusional, inspiring, and annoying". New York Daily News writer David Bianculli gave the season premiere a positive review, and hailed The Amazing Race as "the reality competition series to beat". Salon's Heather Havrilesky praised the season's cast as it contained "some pretty amusing teams" and thought the challenges were entertaining and difficult. Reagan Sulewski of Box Office Prophets wrote that this season contained "one of the most successful Races in many seasons". She added: "After the twin debacles of All-Stars and Family Edition, it was sorely needed". BuddyTV staff were satisfied with the season's final three, and liked the season's reduction in physical tasks from previous editions, believing it made the race more fair for teams with older members. Oscar Dahl of BuddyTV called the season's finale "unremarkable", but appreciated its location and design. He added that he felt all of the final three teams would have been satisfying winners. In contrast, Entertainment Weekly's Josh Wolk disapproved of the final Roadblock, believing it was overly convoluted, and thought the season's conclusion would have been more satisfying had Ronald and Christina won. Christine Seghers of IGN awarded the season's finale a 9/10, and was happy that TK and Rachel had won.

Of the show's first 27 seasons, Rob Has a Podcast correspondents Mike Bloom, Dan Heaton, and Jessica Liese ranked season 12 as the show's sixth-best, citing the cast and their dynamics, elimination order, challenges, placement of non-elimination legs, and introduction of the Speed Bump and U-Turn as highlights. Gossip Cop's Jane Andrews ranked The Amazing Race 12 as the show's ninth-best season, crediting the cast as a major aspect of the season's success, particularly voicing that she was entertained by Nathan and Jennifer's frequent arguing. GameRant's Rhenn Taguiam agreed that the cast was a highlight of the season, calling it "diverse" and "unique", ultimately listing the season as the show's 11th best of the first 34.

== Ratings ==
The Amazing Race 12's premiere episode had the highest premiere ratings of the show's history.

No.	Episode	Viewers (millions)
1	"Donkeys Have Souls, Too"	13.72
2	"I've Become the Archie Bunker of the Home"	10.48
3	"Please, Lord, Give Me Milk"	11.86
4	"Let's Name Our Chicken Phil"	11.80
5	"We Really Burned Bridges, For Sure"	11.26
6	"Cherry on Top of the Sundae That's Already Melted"	11.95
7	"This is Forever, Now"	8.97
8	"Honestly, They Have Witch Powers or Something"	9.69
9	"I Just Hope He Doesn't Croak On Us"	11.99
10	"Sorry, Guys, I'm Not Happy to See You"	11.65
11	"The Final Push"	9.75

== Works cited ==
- Castro, Adam-Troy (2006). My Ox Is Broken!. BenBella Books. ISBN 978-1-932100-91-4.
