= AQY =

AQY may refer to:

- Al-Qaeda in Yemen
- IATA code for Girdwood Airport
- A model of the Volkswagen EA827 engine (discontinued)
