= Tahnee (given name) =

Tahnee is a feminine given name and a variant of Tawny. Notable people with the name include:

- Tahnee Ahtone, Kiowa bedwork artist
- Tahnee Atkinson (born 1992), Australian model
- Tahnee Robinson, (born 1988), American former professional basketball player
- Tahnée Seagrave (born 1995), British downhill mountain biker
- Tahnee Welch (born 1961), American model and actress
