= Connemara Heritage and History Centre =

- Ionad Oidhreachta agus Staire Chonamara

- Location within Ireland
- Established: 1992
- Location: Lettershea, Clifden, County Galway, Ireland
- Coordinates: 53.479462°N 9.911591°W
- Type: open-air museum
- Founders: Martin & Nora Walsh
- Owner: Walsh family
- Public transit access: none
- Parking: On-site
- Website: connemaraheritage.com

The Connemara Heritage and History Centre, also called Dan O'Hara's Homestead, is an open-air museum in the village of Lettershea, near the town of Clifden (Irish: An Clochán), County Galway, in the Connemara region, Ireland. It was established in the late 1980s.

The centre's attractions include audiovisual and history presentations, as well as outdoor exhibits including reconstructions of a crann óg, a ring fort, and a clochán. Also on the grounds are the Dan O'Hara Homestead and pre-famine farm.

It also served as the first "Pit Stop" on The Amazing Race 12.
