= Benignus of Armagh =

Roman Catholic archbishop and saint

Saint Benignus of Armagh
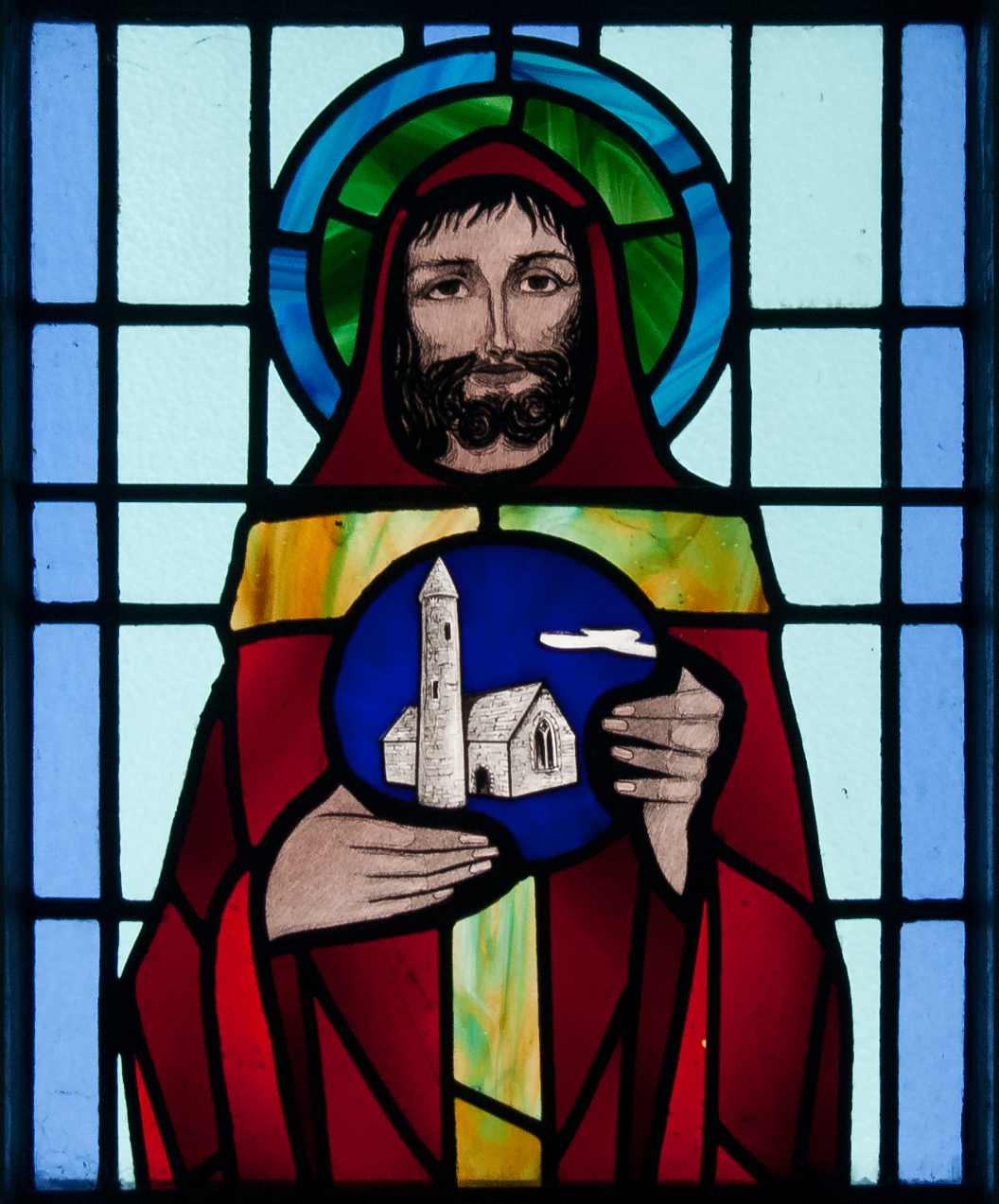
- Died: 467
- Venerated in: Roman Catholic Church, Eastern Orthodox Church
- Feast: 9 November

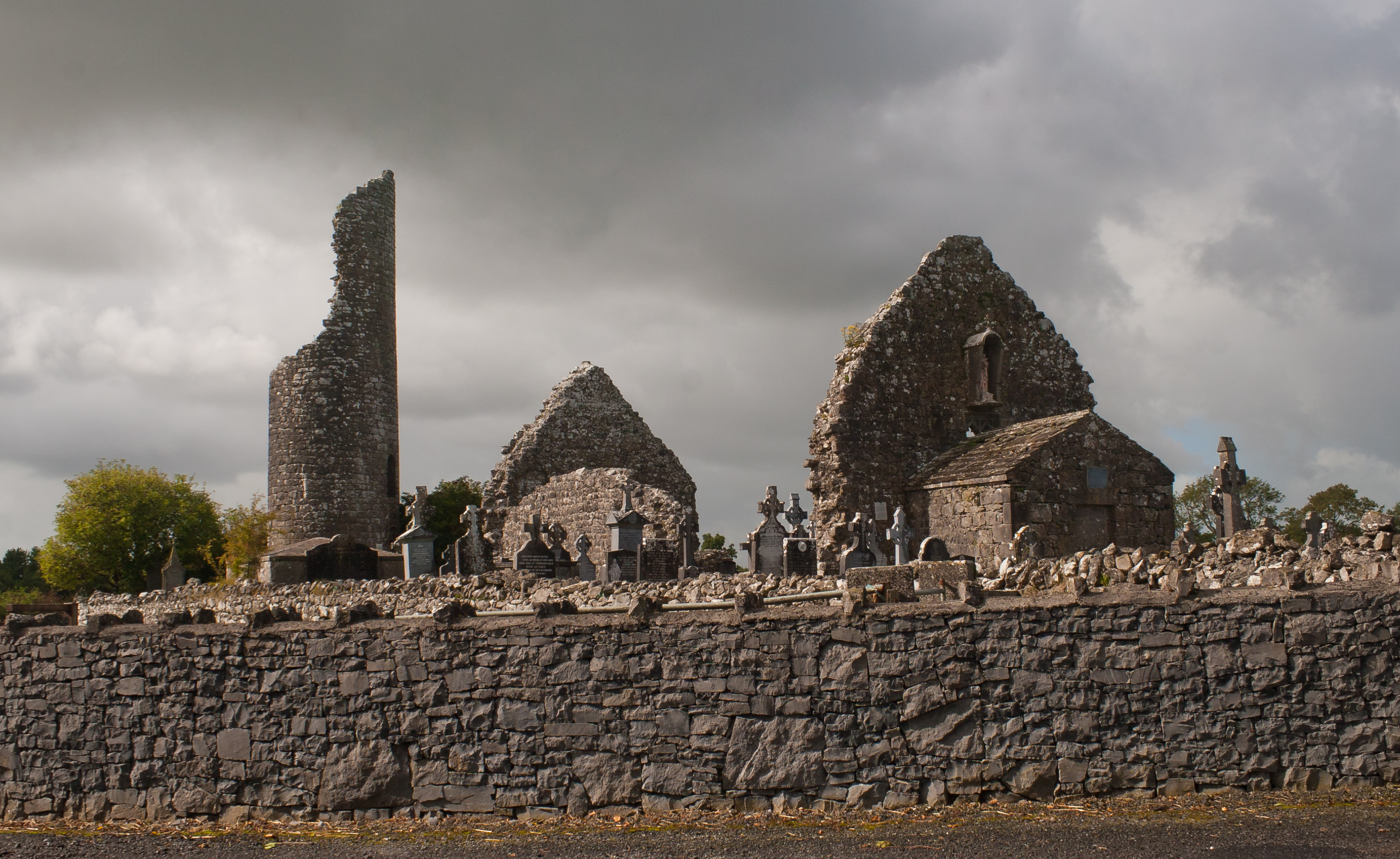
His foundation of Kilbennan in East Galway, close to Tuam, made him the patron of Connacht.

Benán (Benignus of Armagh) (died 467) was the son of Sesenen, an Irish chieftain in the part of Ireland that is now called County Meath.

== Life ==
He was baptised into the Christian faith by Saint Patrick, and became his favourite disciple and his coadjutor in the Diocese of Armagh around AD 450. His gentle disposition suggested the name Benen, which was Latinised as Benignus.

He followed his master in his travels and assisted him in his missionary labours, helping in the formation of choral services. His family may have belonged to the bardic order. From his musical achievements he was known as "Patrick's psalm-singer". As Benignus had been trained by Patrick in sacred learning from his youth and was well versed in the language and learning of his native land, he was appointed secretary to the Commission of Nine, which a few years before had been directed to compile the Brehon Laws.

Benignus is said to have contributed materials for the Psalter of Cashel, and the Book of Rights. He succeeded St. Patrick's nephew Sechnall as coadjutor and became the first rector of the Cathedral School of Armagh.

He was present at the synod that passed the canon recognising "the See Of the Apostle Peter" as the final court of appeals in difficult cases. This canon is to be found in the Book of Armagh. Benignus resigned his coadjutorship in 467 and died the same year. His feast is celebrated on 9 November.

Most authorities identified Patrick's psalm-singer with the Benignus who founded Kilbannon, near Tuam. However, Tirechán's collections in the Book of Armagh states that Benignus of Kilbannon was the son of Lugni of Connaught. Benignus of Kilbannon had a famous monastery, where Jarlath was educated, and he presided over Drumlease. His sister Mathona served as abbess of Tawney, in Tirerrill.

In Cavan, he established a monastery on Drom Benen (hill of Benan), today's Drumbannon. Other monasteries are in cill benen (church of Benan), today's Kilbonane, West Cork.

== Legends ==
=== Benén and Patrick ===
12th century traditions hold a legend where St. Patrick came to an area in Bray or on St. Patrick's Island during his preaching and decided to celebrate the coming Easter among a household of the area, around 433. He stayed with an Irish Chieftain, Sesenen's family, who were immediately baptized. The Vita tripartita Sancti Patricii (Tripartite Life of Saint Patrick) recounts a story of Sesenen's young son of seven years, Benén, placing flowers on the sleeping Saint Patrick. Benén was scolded, but Patrick saw signs of future sanctity and potential in the boy, having a prophetic vision that Benignus would succeed him and be a great bishop and successor. Benén was immediately attached to the saint, and upon his leaving begged to accompany him. Saint Patrick gave him the Latin name Benignus and brought him along, proclaiming Benignus his heir.

=== The Deer's Cry ===
In 433, Patrick clashed with King Laoghaire at Tara over religion. He ignited a Paschal Fire on the hill of Slane and violated an injunction against fires for the Feast of Tara. The druids advised Laoghaire that unless the fire were put out before midnight, it would burn forever. Laoghaire sought him to kill him, but Patrick prayed and routed the attackers, with Laoghaire making a false peace with him. Later, Laoghaire requested Patrick's presence and planned an ambush. Patrick blessed his company with "Saint Patrick's Breastplate", a Lorica. Under cloak of darkness, they went to Tara, and those waiting in ambush saw only eight deer and a fawn with a bundle on its back pass by. The eight deer were Patrick and his clerics, and the fawn was Benignus with Patrick's Epistolary on his back.

=== Trial by Fire ===
After his conflict with Laoghaire, legend reports that a trial by fire was proposed. A pagan druid (some accounts name him Luchat Mael) and Benignus were tied inside a timber building, Benignus' side of dry wood and the druid's of green wood, each wearing the other's garments out of superstition that they provided protection. Benignus was chosen because his recent baptism had purified him of sin. The former was reduced to ash, leaving behind Patrick's chasuble. Benignus was untouched, though the druid's cloak was burnt. At this turning point, Christian teaching was established.

=== Benignus and Earcnat ===
The Tripartite Life of Saint Patrick and the Martyrology of Donegal tell of a story where Earcnat, daughter of Dáire, desired Benignus and died. Benignus brought holy water from Saint Patrick, and sprinkled it upon her. After this, she returned to life, loved Benignus spiritually, and vowed chastity, repenting of her sins.

== See also ==
- Teampull Bheanáin
