= Kilbennen =

Medieval monastic site in County Galway, Ireland

- Cill Bheanáin
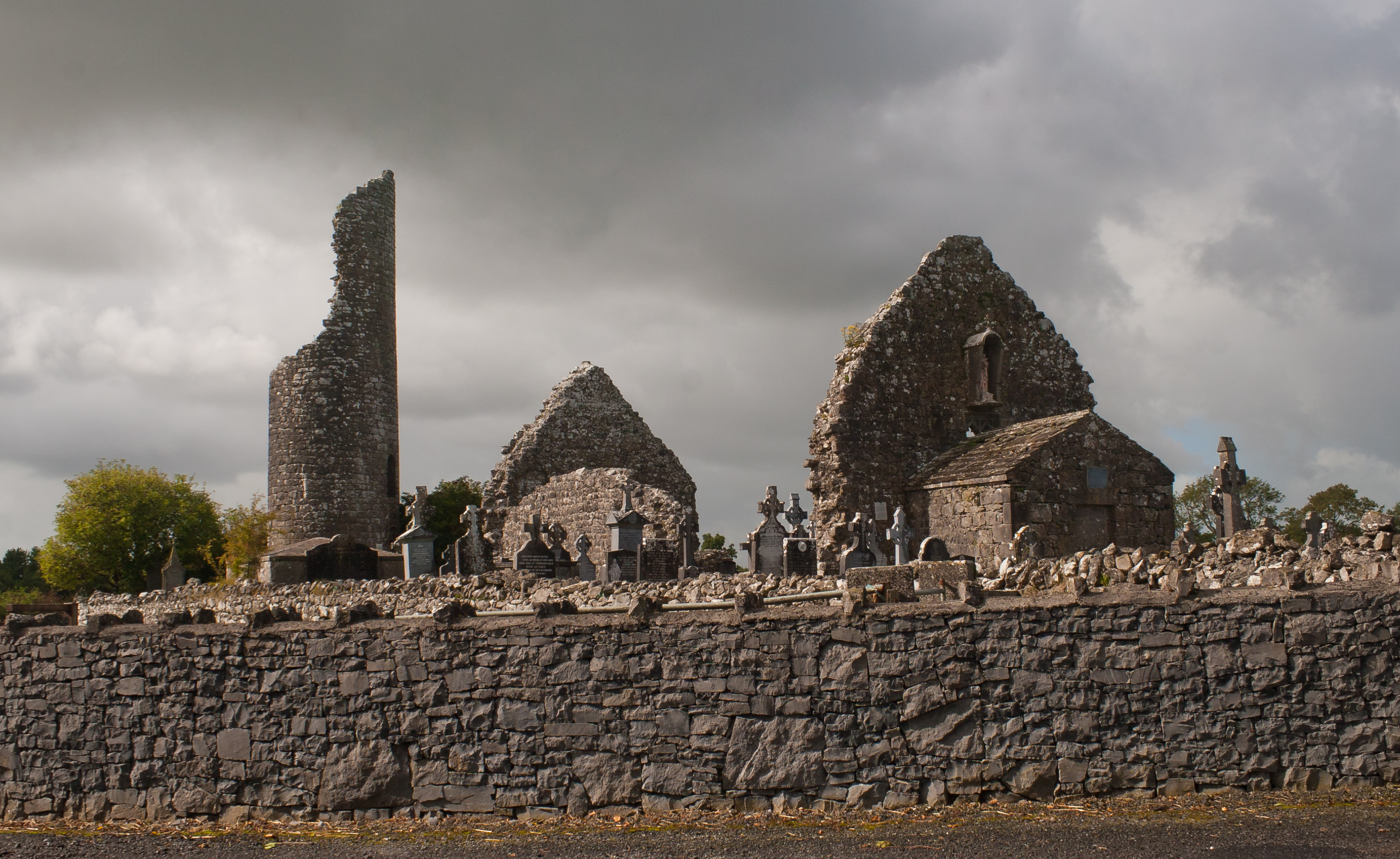

- Location within Ireland
- Interactive map of Kilbennen

Monastery information
- Other names: Kilbannon; Kilbennan; Cell-beneoin; Dun Lughaid
- Order: Franciscans (15th century)
- Established: late 5th century AD
- Disestablished: 15th/16th century
- Diocese: Tuam

People
- Founder: Benignus of Armagh

Architecture
- Status: ruined
- Style: Celtic

Site
- Location: Pollacorragune, Tuam, County Galway
- Coordinates: 53.538801°N 8.892219°W
- Visible remains: Church and round tower
- Public access: yes

Kilbennen or Kilbannon is a medieval ecclesiastical site and National Monument located in County Galway, Ireland.

== Location ==
Kilbennen is located 3.7 km (2.3 mi) northwest of Tuam, on the far side of the River Clare.

== History ==
The monastery here was founded by Benignus of Armagh (Benin, Benen, Bennan), a disciple of Saint Patrick, in the 5th century AD, although the Book of Armagh associates it with a different Benignus, of the Luighne Connacht. Iarlaithe mac Loga. (Saint Jarlath) studied here in the 6th century.. The Annals of the Four Masters record the burning of Kilbennen in 1114. In 1148 they record the death of Ceallach Ua Domhnagain, "noble head of Cill-Beneoin.". The Franciscans built a church c. 1428.. Some conservation work was done in 1880–81. The church is surrounded by a wall and a graveyard, where some ancient crosses and slabs can be seen.

== Ruins and monuments ==
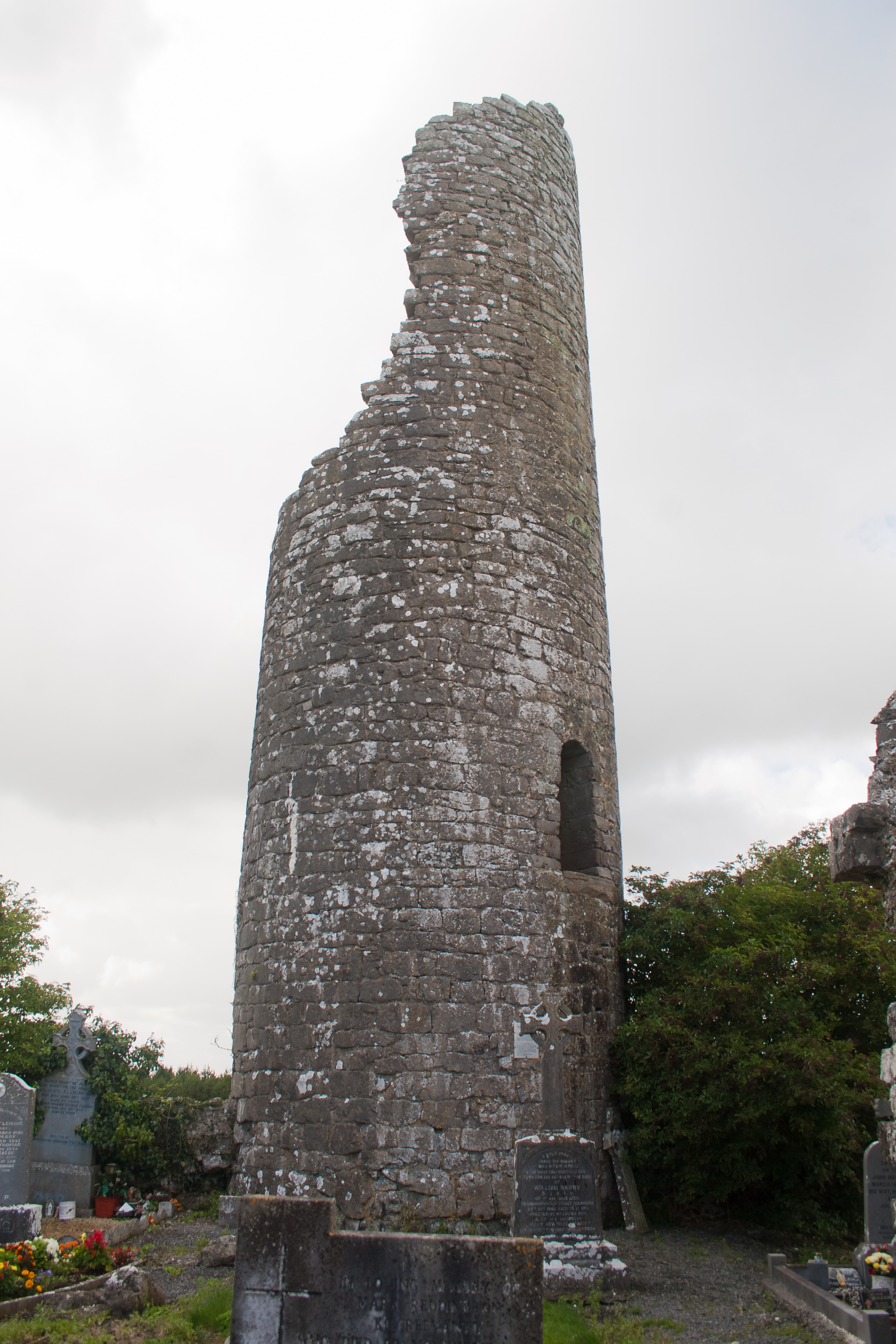
Round tower with doorway visible.

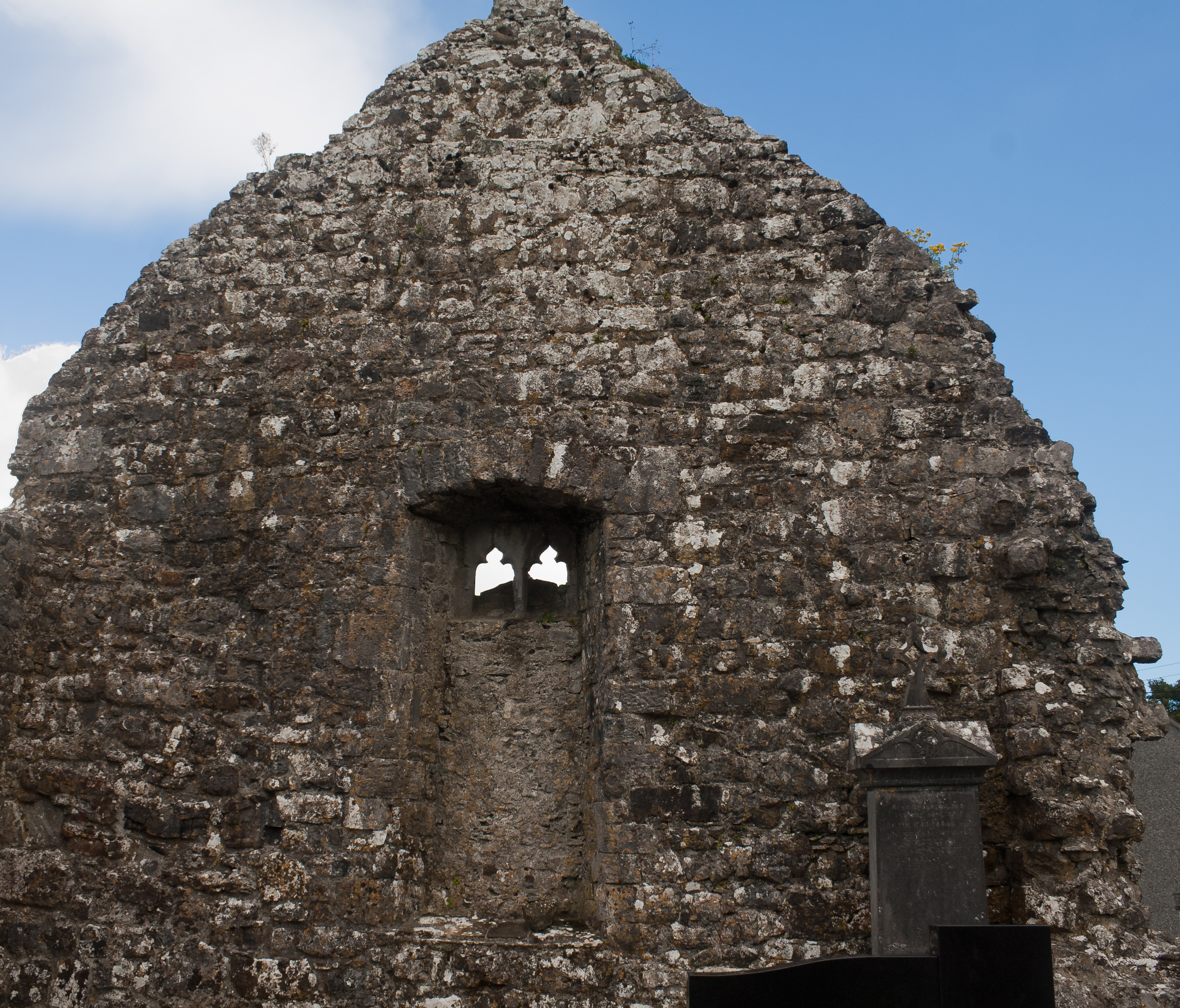
East gable window, now blocked up.

The limestone round tower is badly damaged and stands 16.5 m (54 ft) tall at its highest point and 4.8 m (16 ft) in diameter. It has a sandstone doorway 4.56 m (15.0 ft) off the ground.. Both gables are standing on the church. The east gable had a twin-light cusped ogee-headed window.. A holy well is located to the northwest, where Bennin is said to have healed nine lepers.
