= Drucker School of Management =

Business school of Claremont Graduate University

Coordinates: 34.10171°N 117.70700°W

- Other names: Peter F. Drucker and Masatoshi Ito Graduate School of Management
- Motto: "The Best Way to Predict the Future is to Create It"
- Type: Private business school
- Established: 1971
- Parent institution: Claremont Graduate University
- Accreditation: WASC, AACSB, PRME
- Dean: David Sprott
- Location: Claremont, California, U.S.
- Colors: Red & Black
- Website: www.drucker.cgu.edu

The Drucker School of Management (formally known as the Peter F. Drucker and Masatoshi Ito Graduate School of Management) is the business school of Claremont Graduate University.

== History ==
In 1971, Peter Drucker left New York University and settled in California, where he developed the MBA program for working professionals at Claremont Graduate School, now Claremont Graduate University or CGU. The university first opened its doors in 1925 and is the oldest all-graduate institution in the United States, with many notable alumni in different fields all over the world. The university established the Peter F. Drucker Graduate Management Center in his honor in 1987 (a decade later it would change from a management center to a management school). He taught his last class at the school in the spring of 2002.

Masatoshi Ito provided an initial $3 million gift to help build the school's current home and a subsequent $20 Million gift to assist the School with its future strategic plans. In January 2004, Ito's name was added to the school's name, becoming the Peter F. Drucker and Masatoshi Ito Graduate School of Management.

The school adheres to Drucker's philosophy that management is a liberal art, taking into account not only economics, but also an ethical, holistic dimension that includes history, social theory, law, and the sciences.

== Campus ==
The Drucker School of Management is located in Claremont, California in Los Angeles County. The Ron W. Burkle Family Building is home to both the Drucker School and the Drucker Institute.

== Academics ==
=== International links ===
The Drucker School's relationships with international universities allow it to offer immersive global exchange programs with Hitotsubashi University in Japan, University of St. Gallen in Switzerland, Inha University in South Korea, and Rotterdam School of Management, Erasmus University at Erasmus University Rotterdam in the Netherlands.

=== Rankings ===
Financial engineering, which is a joint program shared by the Drucker School and the university's Institute of Mathematical Sciences, rose to No. 22—its highest position in more than five years—on QuantNet's 2021 ranking of the nation's best financial engineering programs.

The Drucker School is ranked #73 in part-time MBA programs, according to U.S. News & World Report's 2021 rankings.

== People ==
Alumni of the school include Rajiv Dutta (deceased) Chief Financial Officer, eBay and President, Skype, and Tawni Cranz, former Chief Talent Officer at Netflix, Inc. and former Chief People Officer at Waymo.
