= Rajiv Dutta =

- Born: November 17, 2004
- Died: January 31, 2011
- Education: St. Stephen's College, Delhi University (BA in Economics), Drucker School of Management, Claremont Graduate University (MBA)
- Occupation: Technology Manager

Rajiv Dutta (died January 31, 2011) was an Indian technology manager who has worked at major bioscience, semiconductor, software, and online companies.

== Life ==
Dutta worked at Bio-Rad Laboratories from 1988 to 1998, and after a brief tenure at semiconductor equipment manufacturer KLA-Tencor moved to eBay shortly before its IPO as its finance director. He was later promoted to Vice President of Finance and Investor Relations and then to Senior Vice President and Chief Financial Officer. He served as President of Skype, which eBay had acquired in 2005, during 2006, and then moved to serve as president of PayPal, which eBay had acquired in 2002, for nearly two years. He was promoted to executive vice president and elected to the board of directors on January 23, 2008, as he moved to a new post overseeing all of eBay's ecommerce businesses. On January 30, 2009, Elevation Partners designated Rajiv Dutta for election to the Board at Palm Inc., after Donna Dubinsky offered to resign. He joined Elevation Partners in November 2009 as a managing director.

Dutta did his schooling from The Doon School, Dehradun. He hold an undergraduate degree in economics from St. Stephen's College of Delhi University and completed his MBA from the Drucker School of Management of the Claremont Graduate University.

Dutta died in 2011 of colon cancer.
