= Statue of James Cook (Anchorage, Alaska) =

Statue in Anchorage, Alaska, U.S.

Captain Cook Monument
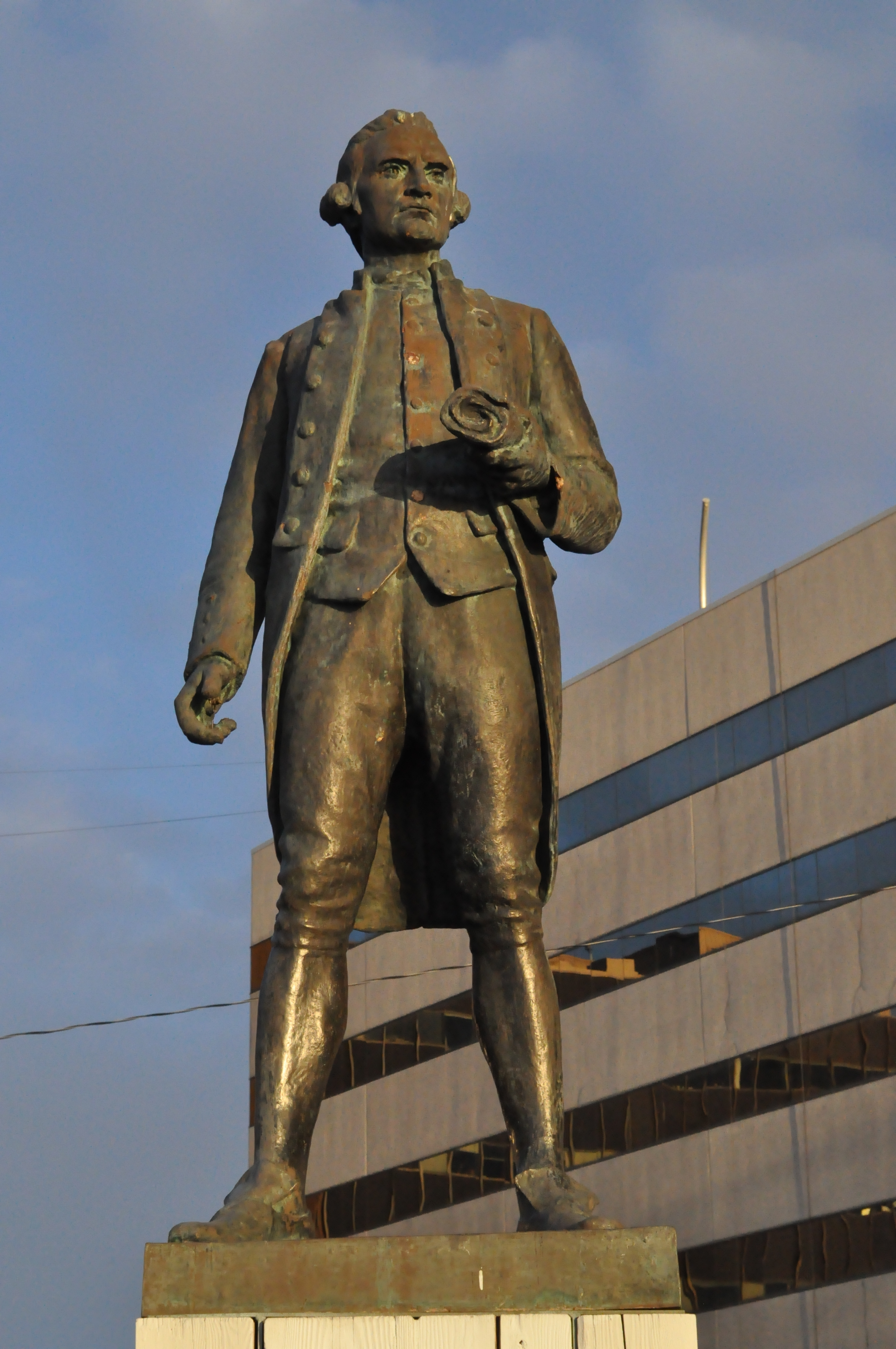
- The statue in 2018
- Artist: Derek Freeborn
- Year: 1976
- Medium: Bronze
- Subject: James Cook
- Location: Anchorage, Alaska, U.S.; 61.219305°N 149.903948°W

The Captain Cook Monument is a life-size bronze statue of the British Royal Navy Captain James Cook. It is installed in Resolution Park in Anchorage, Alaska, United States. It was installed in 1976 and was amended in 2023 to include indigenous Alaskan views of Cook.

== History ==
During the third voyage of James Cook to discover the Northwest Passage, much of what would later be named the Cook Inlet was explored in 1778 by HMS Resolution. In 1976, a statue of James Cook created by Derek Freeborn was installed in Resolution Park in Downtown Anchorage. The statue is a replica of one in Anchorage's sister city, Whitby, England, and was donated by British Petroleum to commemorate the United States Bicentennial.

In 2008, the statue appeared on the finale of The Amazing Race 12.

In the aftermath of the murder of George Floyd, some residents sought the removal of the statue due to Cook's links to colonialism and exploitation of Indigenous people. On June 25, 2020, the Mayor of Anchorage, Ethan Berkowitz stated that the native village of Eklutna would determine the monument's fate. Removal was considered on the grounds that Cook only remained in Anchorage for two weeks and never left his ship. Supporters of the statue felt it should be kept to retain good relations with their sister city of Whitby. The residents opted in favor of retaining the statue. However, a new plaque was added to the statue to put a Dena'ina native view on Cook to state that he just documented places rather than discovering them.
