= Tawny (given name) =

Tawny, Tawni or Tawney is an English given name often given in reference to the color tawny, a pale orange-brown, or yellow-brown color. It is also sometimes a transferred use of the surname Tawney, which is derived from two Norman place names, Saint-Aubin-du-Thenney and Saint-Jean-du-Thenney.

Notable people with the name include:

- Tawny Banh (born 1974), American table tennis player
- Tawni Cranz, American information technology executive
- Tawny Cypress (born 1976), American actress
- Tawny Ellis (born 1981), American film producer
- Tawny Gray, sculptor
- Tawny Kitaen (1961–2021), American actress
- Tawny Little (born 1956), American television personality
- Tawny Moyer (born 1957), American actress
- Tawny Newsome (born 1983), American actress
- Tawni O'Dell (born 1964), American novelist
- Tawny Peaks (born 1970), American pornographic actress
- Tawny Taylor, American romance author
- Tawny Weber, American writer

== See also ==
- Tawney, surname
