= Tawni Cranz =

American information technology executive

- Education: Claremont University, University of California, Santa Barbara

Tawni Cranz is an American information technology executive, formerly serving as the Chief Talent Officer of Netflix, a position she had held from October 2012 until April 2017.

== Early life and education ==
Cranz went to the University of California, Santa Barbara and graduated with a BA in psychology. She then attended graduate school at Claremont University's Peter F. Drucker and Masatoshi Ito Graduate School of Management and received an Executive MBA.

== Career ==
Cranz worked in Human Resources at Bausch & Lomb and FedEx. She joined Netflix in 2007. In October 2012 she became Chief Talent Officer.

In an interview with The Alumni Society, she said, "I wanted to work in different industries to see how HR makes a meaningful impact in a variety of industries. in each setting. I’ve never worked in the same industry twice. Until now with the move from Cruise to Waymo. I’ve worked in start-ups and in large, established organizations. That variety helps me bring a better perspective, and more unique and innovative approaches to each new role I take."

While at Netflix, she implemented a policy allowing parental leave during the first year of a child's life. The policy allows a parent, regardless of gender, to take time off or work part time while receiving full salary and benefits. Parents are not required to file for disability or other state coverage to qualify.
