= Girdwood Airport =

Coordinates: 60°57′58″N 149°07′33″W

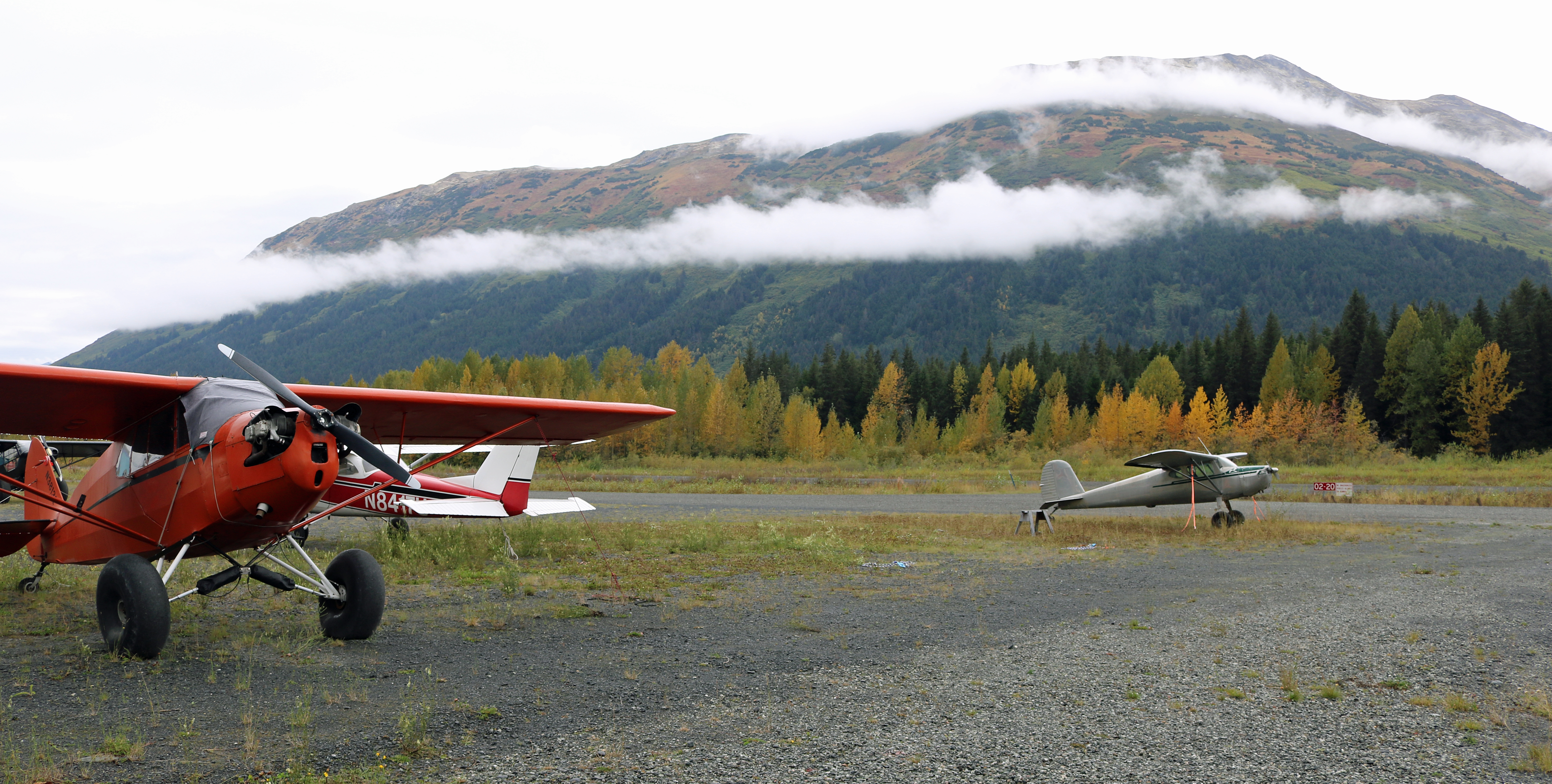
- Looking across the apron towards runway 2/20

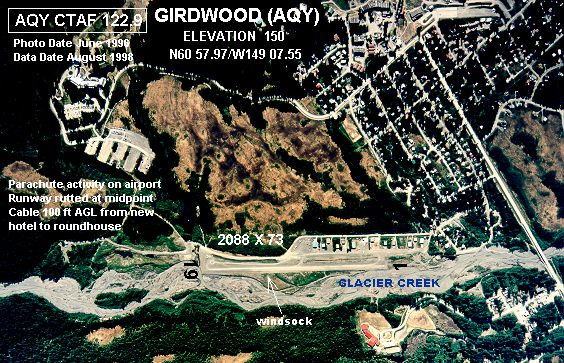
- IATA: AQY; ICAO: none; FAA LID: AQY

Summary
- Airport type: Public
- Owner: State of Alaska DOT&PF - Central Region
- Serves: Girdwood, Alaska
- Elevation AMSL: 150 ft (46 m)
- Interactive map of Girdwood Airport

Runways
Direction	Length		Surface
Direction	ft	m	Surface
2/20	2,095	639	Gravel

Statistics (2019)
- Aircraft operations: 4,000
- Source: Federal Aviation Administration

Girdwood Airport (IATA: AQY, FAA LID: AQY) is a state-owned public-use airport located three miles (5 km) northeast of the central business district of Girdwood, in Anchorage Borough, Alaska, United States.

Girdwood Airport also served as the Finish Line for the 12th season of the popular 5-time Emmy winning reality TV show, The Amazing Race.

== Facilities and aircraft ==
Girdwood Airport has one runway designated 2/20 with a gravel surface measuring 2,095 by 60 feet (639 m × 18 m). For the 12-month period ending December 31, 2019, the airport had 4,000 aircraft operations, an average of 11 per day: 50% general aviation and 50% air taxi.

== See also ==
- List of airports in Alaska
