= Tawney =

Tawney is a surname that refers to:

- C. H. Tawney (1837–1922), English educator and translator
- Cyril Tawney (1930–2005), English singer and songwriter
- James Albertus Tawney (1855–1919), American politician from Minnesota; U.S. representative 1893–1911
- Lenore Tawney (1907–2007), American fiber artist
- R. H. Tawney (1880–1962), English writer, economist, and historian

== See also ==
- Tawny (given name)
- Tamney, a village in County Donegal, Ireland (sometimes called 'Tawney')
