= Bharat Gas Resources =

Indian company

Bharat Gas Resources Limited
- Company type: Subsidiary
- Industry: Oil and gas
- Headquarters: Mumbai, Maharashtra, India
- Owner: Ministry of Petroleum and Natural Gas
- Parent: Bharat Petroleum Corporation Limited

Bharat Gas Resources Limited (BGRL) is a wholly-owned subsidiary of Bharat Petroleum Corporation Limited (BPCL), India's second-largest oil marketing company led by the Ministry of Petroleum and Natural Gas, Government of India. It was amalgamated with the parent with effect from 16 August 2022. The Corporate Affairs Ministry issued the final order on 8 August 2022, approving the scheme of BGRL's amalgamation with BPCL.

The main business of BGRL is gas sourcing and retailing. Headquartered in Mumbai, BGRL was incorporated in June 2018 to set up city gas distribution networks in different geographical areas and streamline the corporate structure and consolidate the assets and liabilities of BGRL with BPCL.

BGRL entered into a sale and purchase agreement with Mozambique Lng1 Company Pte. Ltd. for sourcing LNG from Mozambique.
