= Teampall Bheanáin =

Oratory in the Aran Islands, Ireland

Coordinates: 53.1025°N 9.6661°W

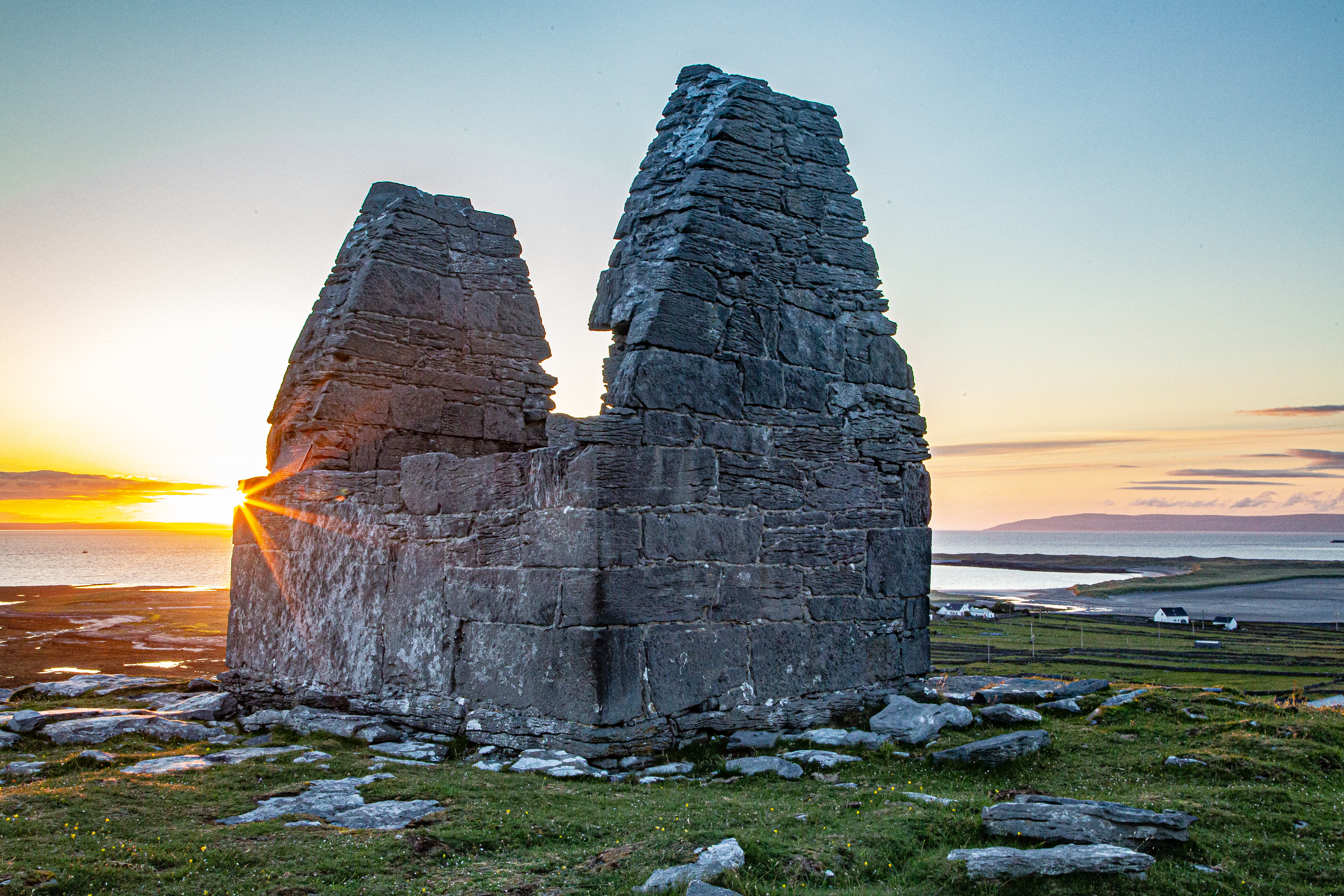
Sunrise at Teampall Bheanáin

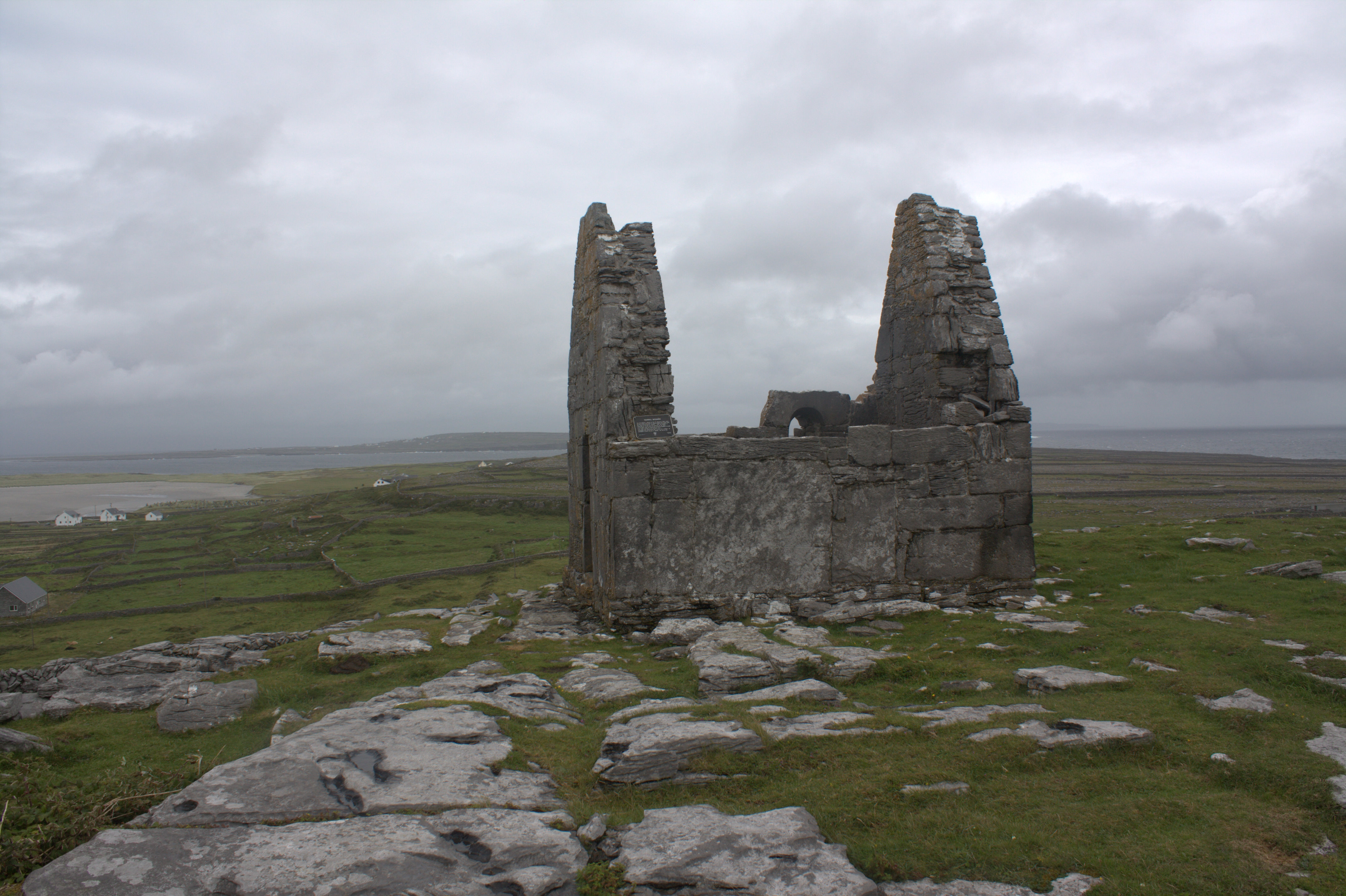
Teampull Bheanáin

The oratory Teampall Bheanáin (Irish pronunciation: [ˈtʲamˠpˠəl̪ˠ ˈvʲaːnˠaːnʲ]; meaning "Benan's Temple") is situated near Kilronan on Inishmore, Aran, Galway Bay, Ireland. A unique example of Celtic church construction. It marks the location of the original monastic settlement founded by Benen, a disciple of St. Patrick, the national saint of Ireland. It dates from the 11th century, and has stood unaltered a thousand years.

It is not a conventional church in the sense of its ability to hold a congregation. It is reasonably assumed to be the tomb-shrine of the saint. This ensured its survival when the adjacent round tower and medieval monastery were recycled to fortify the now-ruined Cromwellian coastal fortress nearby.

The oratory is situated high on a ridge, which dominates the windward southeast sea approach to the main island port. Roofless and with unusually high squared gables it cuts a striking, almost oriental silhouette against the skyline, even though internally it measures a tiny 3.2 m x 2.1 m. It is formed from massive blocks of stone (a single slab forms a half of one side), and is bonded by mortar and very careful fitting. Its thick walls are pierced by a traveated (three beam) narrow north doorway with inclining jambs, and cut away lintel. A small east window with a single stone semi-circular head keeps a vigil towards the mainland of Ireland. The altar faces south rather than east/west which is the usual position, though the symbolism of this is not known.
