= Tamney =

Village in County Donegal, Ireland

Coordinates: 55.199°N 7.691°W

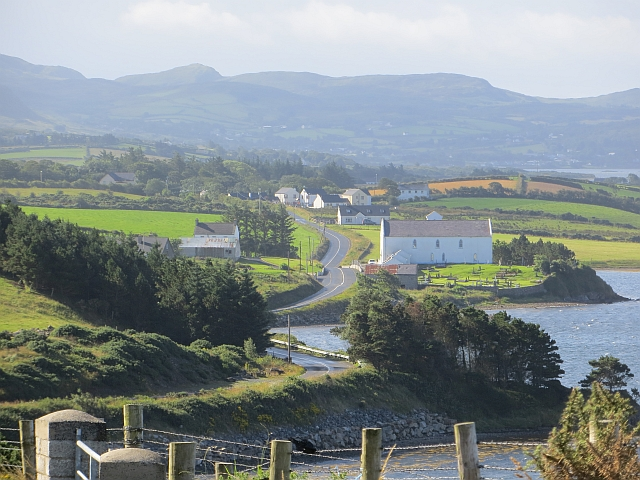
Tamney (also known as Tawny) on the Fanad Peninsula in the north of County Donegal

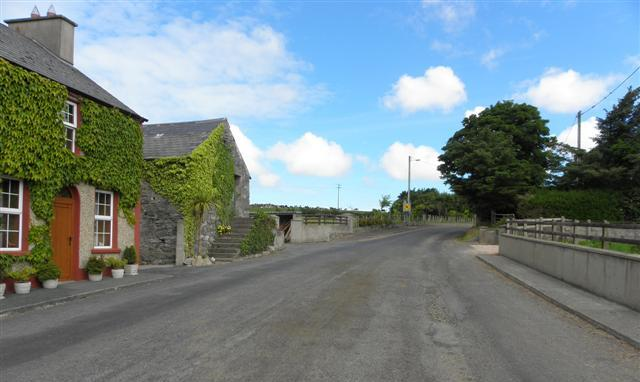
Road and buildings in An Tamhnaigh / Tamney

Tamney, also known as Tawney or Tawny (Irish: An Tamhnaigh, meaning 'arable place or field'), is a small village and townland in Fanad in the north of County Donegal in Ireland. It was the only postal town of the peninsula of Fanad (or Fannet/Fannett) in the late 18th and early 19th centuries. Tawny townland, which has an area of approximately 0.96 square kilometres (0.37 sq mi), had a population of 40 people as of the 2011 census.

Evidence of ancient settlement in the area includes a bullaun stone (in Tawny townland) and a ringfort (in Croaghan). St Columba's Catholic Church (better known as Massmount Chapel, and located in Croaghan) was built c. 1780, with St. Columba's Parochial House (Tawny) built c. 1885. The local national school, St Davaddog's or Tamney National School, had an enrollment of 30 pupils as of 2024.

In 1904, Seumas MacManus wrote a one-act play The Townland of Tamney.
