= Aran Islands bibliography =

This is a bibliography of works relating to the Aran Islands.

- O'Cillin, Tomas. Short Annals of Aran. Tuam: Archiepiscopal Library.
- "A Sketch of the History and Antiquities of the Southern Islands of Aran". Royal Irish Academy Transactions. 14: 1821–5.
- Gill, M. H. (1857). The Aran Isles: A Report. Dublin: Excursion of the Ethnological Section of the British Association from Dublin to the Western Islands of Aran.
- Haverty, Martin (1859). Ethnological Excursion to the Aran Islands. Dublin.
- Wright, E. P. (1866). "Notes on the Flora of the Islands of Arran". Proceedings Dublin Natural History Society. 5.
- Kinahan, George Henry. "Notes on Some of the Ancient Villages in the Aran Isles". Royal Irish Academy Proceedings. 10. County of Galway: 1866–70.
- Kilbride, Rev. William (1868). "Notes on Some Antiquities on Aranmore in the Bay of Galway". Journal of the Historical and Antiquarian Association of Ireland. 1 (3).
- Hart, H. C. (1875). A List of Plants Found in the Aran Islands. Dublin.
- Murphy, Denis. "On Two Sepulchral Urns Found in June 1885, in the South Isles of Arran". Royal Irish Academy Proceedings. 12: 1879–88.
- Barry, James G. "Aran of the Saints". Royal Society of Antiquaries of Ireland Journal. 7: 1885–6.
- Burke, Oliver J. (1887). The South Isles of Aran. London: Kegan, Paul, Trench and Co.
- A. C. Haddon & C. R. Browne. "The Ethnography of the Aran Islands". Royal Irish Academy Proceedings. 2 (3): 1891–3.
- Report on the Aran Islands. Congested Districts Board. 1893.
- Colgan, Nathaniel (1893). "Notes on the Flora of the Aran Islands". Irish Naturalists' Journal.
- Colgan, Nathaniel (1895). "Witchcraft In the Aran Islands". Royal Society of Antiquaries of Ireland Journal. 25.
- MacAlister, R. A. S. (1895). "Crosses at Kilbrecan, Aran". Royal Society of Antiquaries of Ireland Journal. 25.
- Westropp, Thomas J. (1895). "The North Isle of Aran". Royal Society of Antiquaries of Ireland Journal. 25.
- Die araner mundart, Franz Nikolaus Finck, Marburg 1899
- Smuainte ar Árainn, Úna Ní Fhaircheallaigh, ar n-a cur amac do Connrad na Gaedilge, Dublin, 1902
- Synge, John M. (July 1905). The Kelp Makers. Manchester Guardian.
- The Aran Islands, John M. Synge, Elkin Mathews, London, 1907
- Westropp, Thomas J. (1910). "A Study of the Fort of Dun Aengusa in Inishmore, Aran Isles, Ireland: Its Plan, Growth and Records". Royal Irish Academy Proceedings. 28 (C). London: Hodges, Figgis & Co.: 1909–10.
- Westropp, Thomas J. (1910). "A Study of the Early Forts and Stone Huts in Inishmore, Aran Islands". Royal Irish Academy Proceedings. 28 (C).
- Phillips, R. A. (1910). "The Non-Marine Mollusca of Inishmore". Irish Naturalists' Journal. 19.
- Westropp, Thomas J. (1912–13). "Brasil and the Legendary Islands of the North Atlantic". Royal Irish Academy Proceedings. 30.
- MacAlister, R. A. S. (1913). "The Stone of the Seven Romans". Royal Society of Antiquaries of Ireland Journal. 3 (6).
- Hedderman, B. N. (1917). Glimpses of My Life in Aran. London: Simpkin, Marshall, Hamilton, Kent & Co.
- MacAlister, R.A.S. (1922). "The Cross Inscribed Holed Stone at Mainster Chiarain, Aran, Co. Galway". Royal Society of Antiquaries of Ireland Journal. 52.
- Klimm, L. E. (1927). "Inishmore: An Outpost Island". Geographical Review. 17 (3): 387–396. doi:10.2307/208322. JSTOR 208322.
- O'Ceallaigh, Tadhg (April 1929). Ailleadoireacht i nArainn. An Stoc.
- Oileáin Árann, Mártan Ó Domhnaill, Muinntir C. S. Ó Fallamhain, Dublin, 1930
- Murphy, Robert Cushman (June 1931). "The Timeless Arans". National Geographic Magazine.
- Stelfox, A. W. (November 1933). "On the Occurrence of a Peculiar Race of the Humble Bee, Bombus Smithianus White, on the Aran Islands in Western Ireland". Irish Naturalists' Journal. 4 (12).
- Man of Aran. Robert Flaherty. 1934.
- Oidhche Sheanchais or The Story Teller. Robert Flaherty. 1934.
- O'Flaherty, Tom (1934). Aranmen All. Dublin: Hamish Hamilton Ltd.
- O'Flaherty, Tom (1935). Cliffmen of the West. London.
- Mullen, Pat (1935). Man of Aran. New York: E.P. Dutton & Co.
- Klimm, L. E. (1935). "The Relation Between Field Patterns and Jointing in the Aran Islands". Geographical Review. 25 (4): 618–624. doi:10.2307/209400. JSTOR 209400.
- Mullen, Pat (1936). Hero Breed. London.
- Klimm, L. E. (1936). "The Rain Tanks of Aran". Bulletin of the Geographical Society of Philadelphia.
- McNeill, D. B. (1938). "The Antiquarian Remains of Inisheer, Aran, County Galway". Royal Society of Antiquaries of Ireland Journal. 68.
- Mullen, Pat (1940). Come Another Day. London: Faber & Faber.
- Inishmore, Aran (1943). "Finding of Whales' Vertebrae in Clochan-na-Carraige". Royal Society of Antiquaries of Ireland Journal. 73. Co. Galway: H. G. Leask.
- "History of the Aran Islands", T.V. O'Brien, 1945 (manuscript copies in Trinity College Dublin (#3198) and London Library)
- Rivers, Elizabeth (1946). "Stranger in Aran". Dublin: Cuals Press.
- Mason, Thomas H. (1950). The Islands of Ireland; their scenery, people, life, and antiquities. London: Batsford.
- Goulden, J. R. W. (March 1952). "Arkin: Outpost in Aran". Irish Sword. 1 (4).
- De Paor, Liam (June 1955). "The Limestone Crosses of Clare and Aran". Journal of the Galway Archaeological and Historical Society. 26.
- Armstrong, Edward A. (October 1957). "Birds of the Aran Islands". Irish Naturalists' Journal. 12 (8).
- Hackett, Earle and Folan (June 1958). "The ABO and RH Blood Groups of the Aran Islanders". Irish Journal of Medical Science. 33 (390): 247–261. doi:10.1007/BF02951578. PMID 13549082. S2CID 42880127.
- Barrett, John H. (October 1958). "Birds Seen on Inishmore, Aran Islands". Irish Naturalists' Journal. 12 (12).
- Gailey, R. A. (1959). "Settlement and Population in the Aran Islands". Irish Geography. 4 (1): 65–78. doi:10.1080/00750775909555528.
- Synge, John M. (1962). Four plays and the Aran Islands. London: Oxford University Press.
- Marshall, Arthur Calder (1963). The Innocent Eye. London.
- Pyle, Hilary (1964). "When the Vestal Came to Aran". The Irish Times.
- Síocháin, P. A. Ó (1967) [1962]. Aran: Islands of Legend (3rd ed.). Dublin: Devin-Adair.
- Messenger, John C. (1983) [1969]. Inis Beag: Isle of Ireland. Long Grove, IL, USA: Waveland Press. ISBN 0881330515. OCLC 10578752.
- Messenger, John C. (1971). "Sex and Repression in an Irish Folk Community". In Donald S. Marshall; Robert C. Suggs (eds.). Human Sexual Behavior: Variations in the Ethnographic Spectrum. New York: Basic Books. ISBN 9780465031573.
- The Aran Islands and Galway City including Westropp's Account of the Aran Islands. Dublin: Mount Salus Press. 1971.
- Thomas, Veronica (April 1971). "The Arans, Ireland's Invincible Isles". National Geographic Magazine.
- Synge, J. M. (1971). Lilo Stephens (ed.). My Wallet of Photographs. Dublin: Dolmen Press. ISBN 9780851051895.
- Skelton, Robin (1971). J. M. Synge and His World. Viking Press. ISBN 9780670407293.
- The Aran Islands, Daphne Pochin Mould, David & Charles, Newton Abbot, 1972
- Ruth Wills Shaw & Devin-Adair, ed. (1975). J.M. Synge's Guide to the Aran Islands. Old Greenwich.
- Daly, Leo (1975). Oileain Arann. Swinford.
- Robinson, Tim; Cill Ronain (1975). Oileain Arann, a Map of the Aran Islands.
- Field and Shore: Daily Life & Traditions: Aran Islands 1900. Dublin: O'Brien Educational. 1977.
- Curriculum Development Unit (1977). A World of Stone. Dublin: O'Brien Press.
- Cuaiart ar Oilean Arann; Dara O'Connaola (1978). Guide to the Aran Islands. Ceard Shiopa Inis Oirr Teo.
- George Stoney (1978). How the Myth Was Made. New York: Museum of Modern Art.
- Ó Siadhail, Micheal (1978). Téarmaí tógálá agus tís as Inis Meáin. Dublin: Institiúid Ardléinn Bhaile Átha Cliath.
- O'Connaola, Dara (1979). An Gaiscioch Beag. An Gum.
- Smith, Dennis (1980). Aran Islands, a Personal Journey. Garden City: Doubleday & Co.
- Tim Robinson; Cill Ronain (1980). Oileain Arann, a Map and Guide.
- Webb, D. A. (1980). "The Flora of the Aran Islands". Journal of Life Sciences. 2. Royal Dublin Society.
- Powell, Antoine (1984). Oileain Arann, Stair na nOilean Anuas Go dti. Dublin: Wolfhound Press.
- Robinson, Tim (1986). Stone of Aran: Pilgrimage. Dublin: Lilliput Press & Mullingar/Wolfhound Press.
- Conamara Agus Arainn, 1880-1980, Gneithe den Stair Shoisialta, Micheal O'Conghaile, Clo Iar-Chonnachta Teo., Beal an Daingin, Conamara, 1988
- P. M. McCarthy; M.E. Mitchell (1988). Lichens of the Burren Hills and the Aran Islands. Galway Officina Typographica.
- Thatched Homes of the Aran Islands, An Teachin Ceanntui, Dara O'Connaola, Ceard Shiopa Inis Oirr Teo., 1988
- Messenger, John C. (1989). Inis Beag revisited: the anthropologist as observant participator. Salem, Wisconsin: Sheffield. ISBN 0-88133-408-1.
- An Aran Reader. Dublin: Lilliput Press. 1991.
- Goldman, Arnold; Colin Smythe (1991). Synge's the Aran Islands: A World of Grey. Gerrards Cross.
- Harmony Guide to Aran Knitting. London: Lyric Books Ltd. 1991.
- Archaeological Inventory of County Galway. Dublin: Stationery Office. 1993.
- Concheanainn, Peadar Ó (1993). Inis Meáin : seanchas agus scéalta. Dublin: An Gúm.
- Hart, William E. (1993). Synge's First Symphony: the Aran Islands. New Britain, CT, USA: Mariel Publications.
- Pedersen, Holger (1994). Scéalta Mháirtín Neile : Bailiúchán scéalta ó Árainn. Dublin: Comhairle Bhéaloideas Éireann An Coláiste Ollscoile.
- Robinson, Tim (1995). Stones of Aran: Labyrinth. Dublin, Ireland: Lilliput Press.
- Eolas, Tir (1995). The Book of Aran.
- "The Aran Isles". National Geographic Magazine. April 1996.
- Dirrane, Bridget (1997). A woman of Aran: the life and times of Bridget Dirrane. Dublin: Blackwater Press. ISBN 9780861219629.
- McDonagh, Martin (1997). The Cripple of Inishmaan. London: Methuen Drama.
- O'Donnell, Edward Eugene (1998) [1925]. Images of Aran: photographs by Father Browne. Dublin: Wolfhound Press.
- Nelson, E. Charles (1999). Wild plants of the Burren and the Aran Islands: a Simple Souvenir Guide to the Flowers and Fern. Wilton, Cork, Ireland: Collins Press.
- Doyle, Bill (1999). The Aran Islands: Another World. Dublin: Lilliput Press. ISBN 9781901866155.
- Dara Ó Maoildhia; Aisling Árann; Inis Mór (2002). Legends in the Landscape, Pocket Guide to Árainn, Inis Mór, Aran Islands. Co Galway, Ireland.
- Ruairí Ó Síocháin (2003). Aran Islands - A Journey through Changing Times (DVD). Dublin.
