= Peter Cox (photographer) =

Peter Cox is an Irish landscape photographer, author and gallery owner. Originally from Dublin, he worked as a computer systems engineer in the United States before returning to Ireland in 2005 to become a full-time landscape photographer. He was named landscape photographer of the year at the 2007 Irish Professional Photographers Association National Photographic Awards. He has published three books of Irish landscape photography, and is known for his aerial work, including what was described as the first Irish photography book made using drone cameras. He operates a gallery in Glengarriff, County Cork.

== Career ==
Cox grew up in Dublin and worked as a computer systems engineer in the United States before returning to Ireland and taking up photography full-time in 2005. He briefly undertook commercial and wedding work before concentrating on landscape photography, citing the American photographer Ansel Adams as an influence. Profiling him in the Irish Independent in May 2011, entertainment editor Ken Sweeney wrote that Cox had been "hailed as 'Ireland's Ansel Adams'".

In 2010 the Irish Independent reported on Cox flying over Iceland to photograph the erupting Eyjafjallajökull volcano from the air. In 2017 the British magazine Outdoor Photography published a profile of him.

Cox has provided aerial and repeat photography for coastal geoscience fieldwork in the west of Ireland led by his sister, the geologist Rónadh Cox of Williams College, whose team tracks the movement of large coastal boulders by comparing photographs and drone imagery taken year on year. He is a co-author of the team's 2018 paper in Earth-Science Reviews, which reported that storms in the winter of 2013–2014 moved boulders weighing as much as 620 tonnes.

In October 2017 his work was shown in An t-Oileán (The Island), a group exhibition by the IrishLight Collective at the CHQ Building in Dublin, which was covered in The Times.

Cox opened his first gallery in Killarney, County Kerry, in 2011. In 2026 he opened a gallery in Glengarriff, County Cork.

== Books ==
Cox has published three books of his photography:

- The Irish Light (2012; third edition 2016, with a foreword by the English landscape photographer Joe Cornish). ISBN 9781908655059 Funded through Kickstarter after conventional publishers passed on it, it collects 90 images from seven years' work.
- Atlantic Light: The West Coast of Ireland in Photographs (2015), a collection of aerial photographs of the Wild Atlantic Way described as the first Irish photography book produced using drone cameras. The aerial filming undertaken for the book was covered by the photography website PetaPixel in 2015.
- The Skelligs: Islands on the Edge of the World (2020), photographed over nearly a decade on and around the Skellig Islands off County Kerry.

The Irish Light was reviewed in The Sunday Times's Culture section, the Sunday Business Post, the Evening Herald, and the landscape photography journal On Landscape. The Skelligs was featured in the Irish Examiner, and Cox discussed it in interviews on RTÉ Radio 1's Arena (2020), Today FM's The Last Word (2020), and Virgin Media Television's Ireland AM (2020). His images also appear in the Cork University Press book accompanying the RTÉ series Secrets of the Irish Landscape.

== Television ==
Aerial footage filmed by Cox featured in the RTÉ One documentary The Du Plantier Case (2017), about the killing of Sophie Toscan du Plantier in West Cork, and in Jim Sheridan's Sky documentary series on the same case, Murder at the Cottage: The Search for Justice for Sophie (2021). Cox appeared as a contributor in the RTÉ One series Great Lighthouses of Ireland, discussing and showing his photography of Irish lighthouses, including in the second-series finale broadcast in 2022. His work has also been used in the RTÉ series Creedon's Wild Atlantic Way. In 2008 he acted as photographic mentor on the TG4 series I bhFócas le, in which public figures took up photography; among those he tutored was the future Taoiseach Enda Kenny, who later opened Cox's Killarney gallery. He appeared in Irlande : les îles d'Aran, a 2023 episode of the Arte documentary series L'Histoire secrète des paysages, about the landscape of the Aran Islands. In 2014 Cox was filmed on the Dingle Peninsula for the Ireland instalment of the Arte series Wanderlust! Europas schönste Wanderwege ("Wanderlust! Europe's Most Beautiful Hiking Trails"), presented by the travel writer Bradley Mayhew. Mayhew joins him while he is photographing near Dunmore Head and the two walk the coast together, Cox discussing his approach and the landscape of the peninsula; the commentary describes his pictures as capturing "unique moments of atmospheric light and colour", returning to the same location "year in, year out, in the hope of capturing the perfect shot". He shot the aerial photography for An tOileán Tiar / The Western Island, a short film on the history and culture of the Blasket Islands made for the Office of Public Works visitor centre at Dún Chaoin, County Kerry, and shares its photography credit.
