= Dún Aonghasa =

Hill fort on Inis Mór, western Ireland

- Dun Aengus
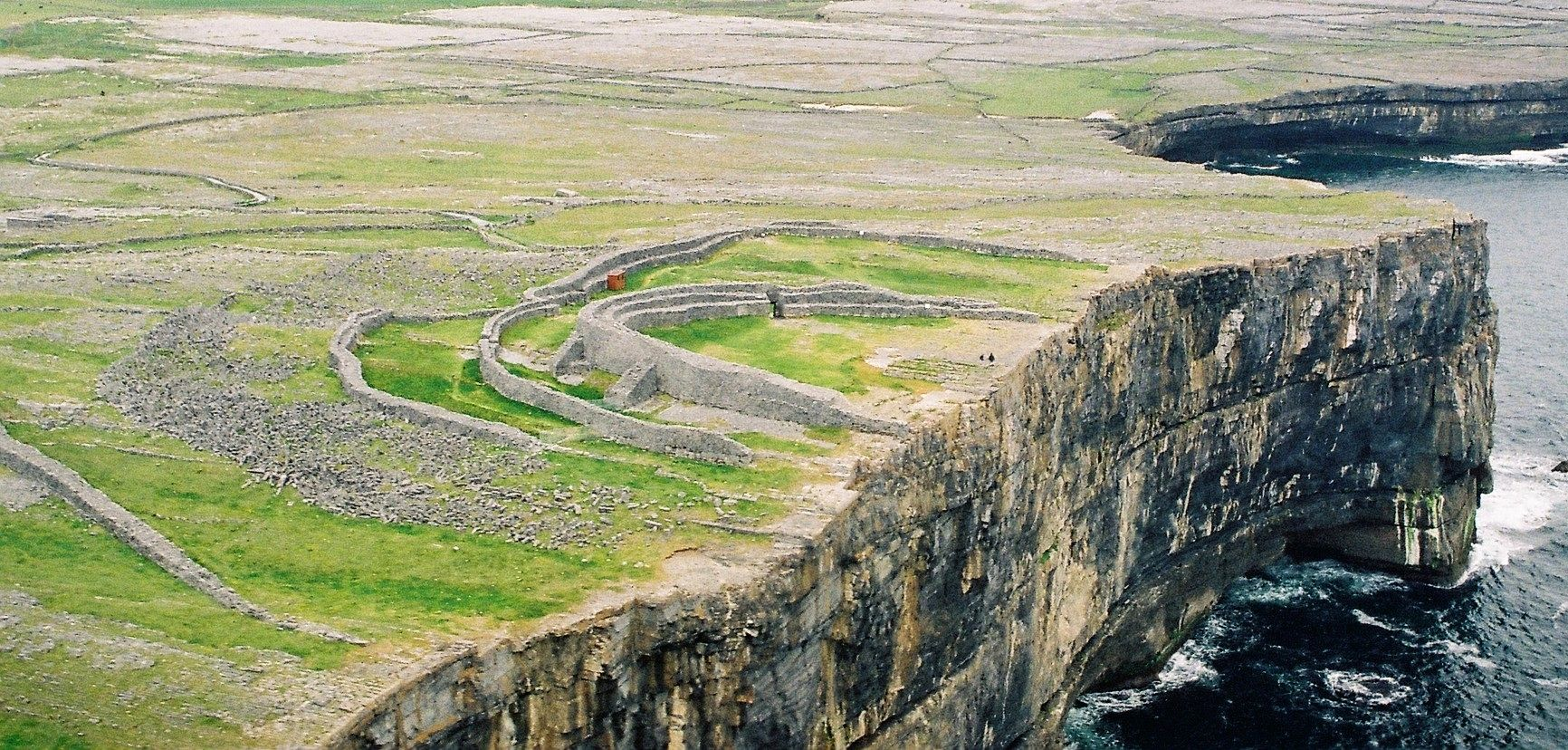

- Location within Ireland
- 53°7′33″N 9°46′5″W
- Type: hill fort/promontory fort
- Periods: Bronze Age, Iron Age, early Medieval
- Location: Inis Mór
- Region: Ireland

History
- Built: from 1100 BC

Site notes
- Material: limestone
- Area: 6 ha (15 acres)
- Public access: yes

National monument of Ireland
- Reference no.: 23

Dún Aonghasa (unofficial anglicised version Dun Aengus) is the best-known of several prehistoric hill forts on the Aran Islands of County Galway, Ireland. It lies on Inis Mór, at the edge of a 100-metre-high (330 ft) cliff.

A popular tourist attraction, Dún Aonghasa is also an important archaeological site.

== History ==
It is not known exactly when Dún Aonghasa was built, though it is now thought that most of the structures date from the Bronze Age and Iron Age. An early Iron Age bird-head Fibula (brooch) was discovered in a wall of the site in 1839. T. F. O'Rahilly surmised in what is known as O'Rahilly's historical model that it was built in the 2nd century BC by the Builg following the Laginian conquest of Connacht. Excavations at the site indicate that the first construction goes back to 1100 BC, when rubble was piled against large upright stones to form the first enclosure. Signs of human habitation and moulds for casting bronze were found and dated towards the end of the Bronze Age in Europe (around 900 BC). Around 500 BC, the triple wall defences were probably constructed along the fort's western side.

Its name, meaning 'Fort of Aonghas', may refer to the pre-Christian god of the same name described in Irish mythology, or the mythical king, Aonghus mac Úmhór. It has thus traditionally been associated with the Fir Bolg.

== Form and function ==
The fort consists of a series of four concentric walls of dry stone construction, built on a high cliff some one hundred metres above the sea. At the time of its construction sea levels were considerably lower and a recent RTÉ documentary estimates that originally it was 1000 metres from the sea. Surviving stonework is four metres wide at some points. The original shape was presumably oval or D-shaped but parts of the cliff and fort have since collapsed into the sea. Outside the third ring of walls lies a defensive system of limestone spikes, known as a cheval de frise, planted in upright or slanting outwards positions in fissures of the limestone are still largely well-preserved (cheval de frise can also be found in County Clare at Ballykinvarga). These ruins also feature a huge rectangular stone slab, the function of which is unknown. Impressively large among prehistoric ruins, the outermost wall of Dún Aonghasa encloses an area of approximately 6 hectares (14 acres).

== Today ==
The walls of Dún Aonghasa have been rebuilt to a height of 6m and have wall walks, chambers, and flights of stairs. The restoration is easily distinguished from the original construction by the use of mortar.

There is a small museum illustrating the history of the fort and its possible functions. Also in the vicinity is a Neolithic tomb and a small heritage park featuring examples of a traditional thatched cottage and a poteen distillery.

== Nearby sites ==
Dún Dúchathair ('Black Stone Ringfort"), Dún Eoghanachta ('Fort of the Eóganachta'), and Dún Eochla are similar prehistoric sites on Inis Mór. Dún Chonchúir ('Fort of Conchobar') is located on nearby Inis Meáin.

== Image gallery ==
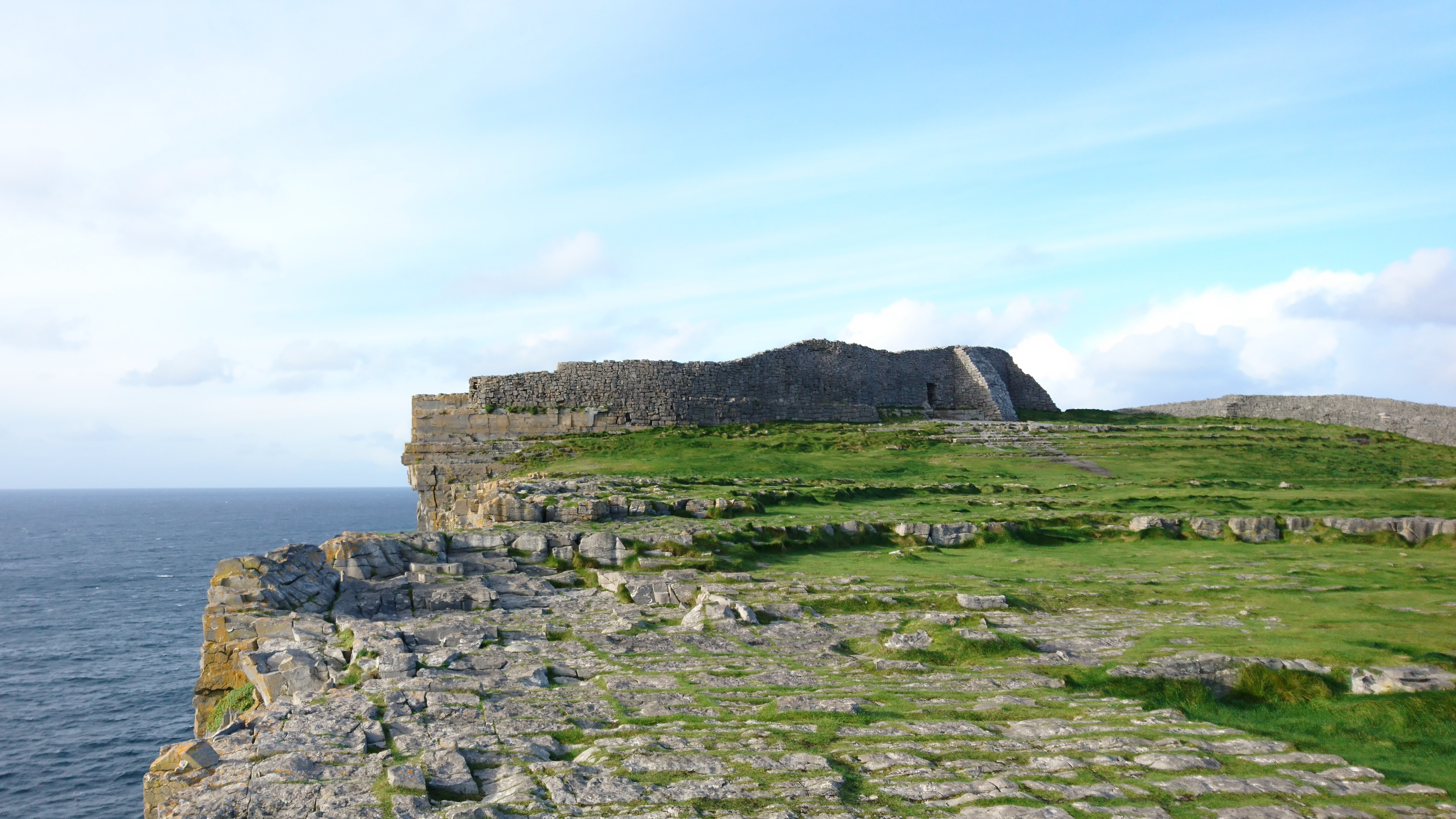

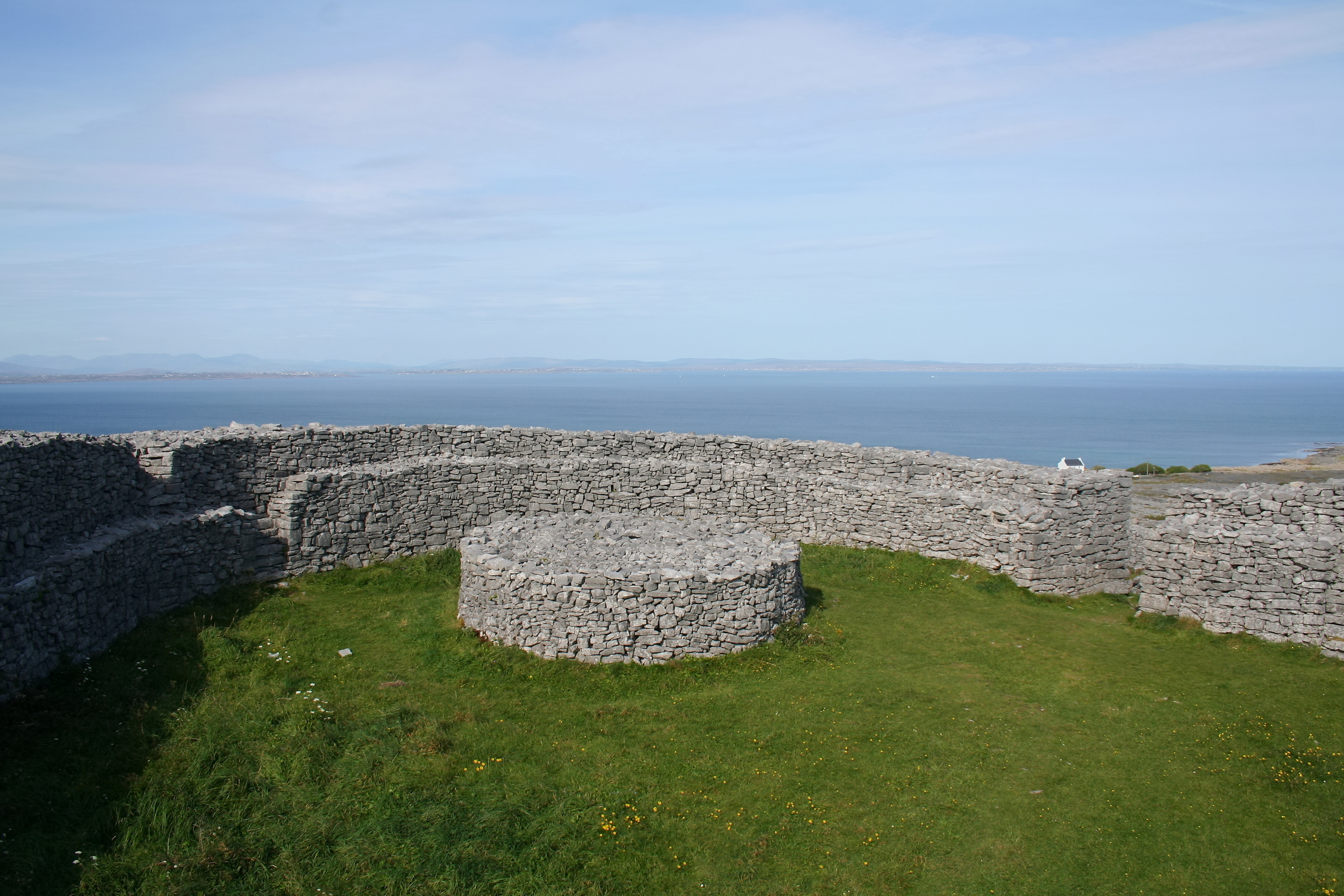
Interior of Dún Eochla

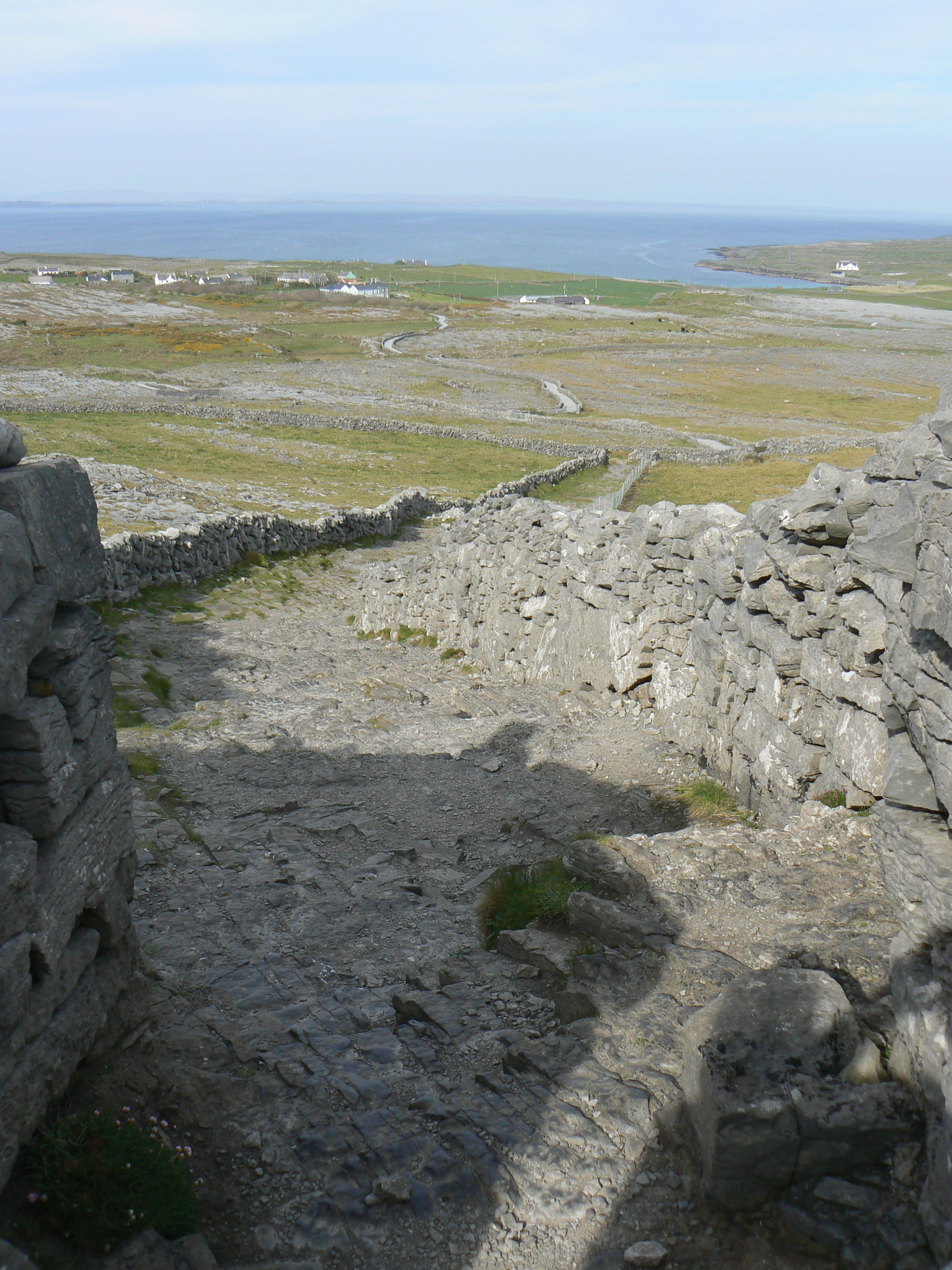

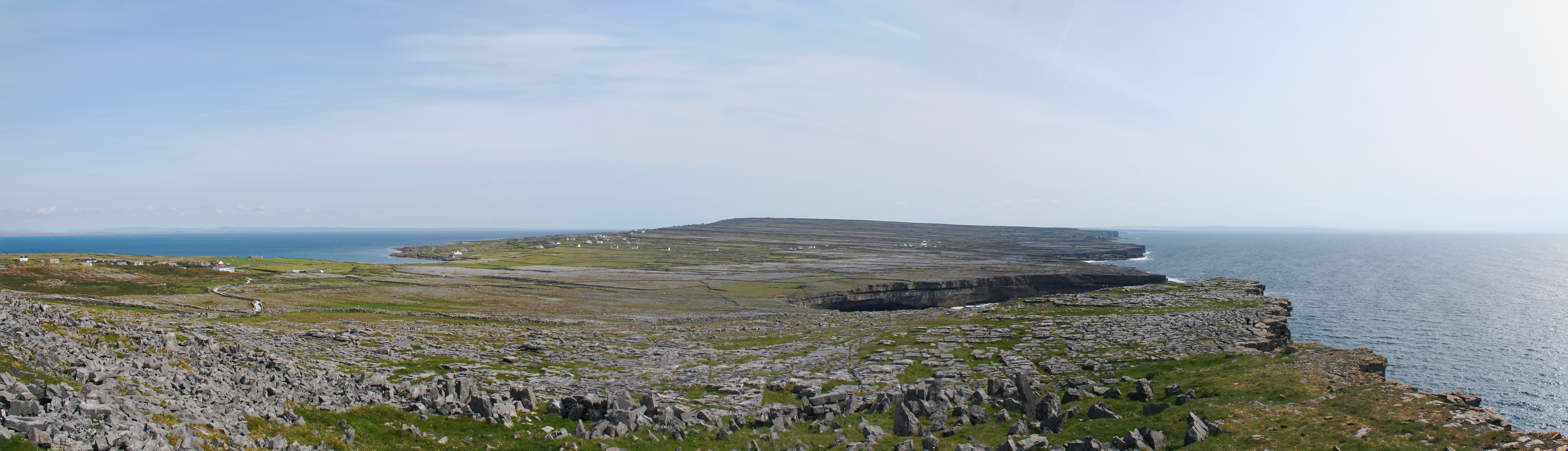
A view over the karst landscape on Inis Mór from Dún Aonghasa

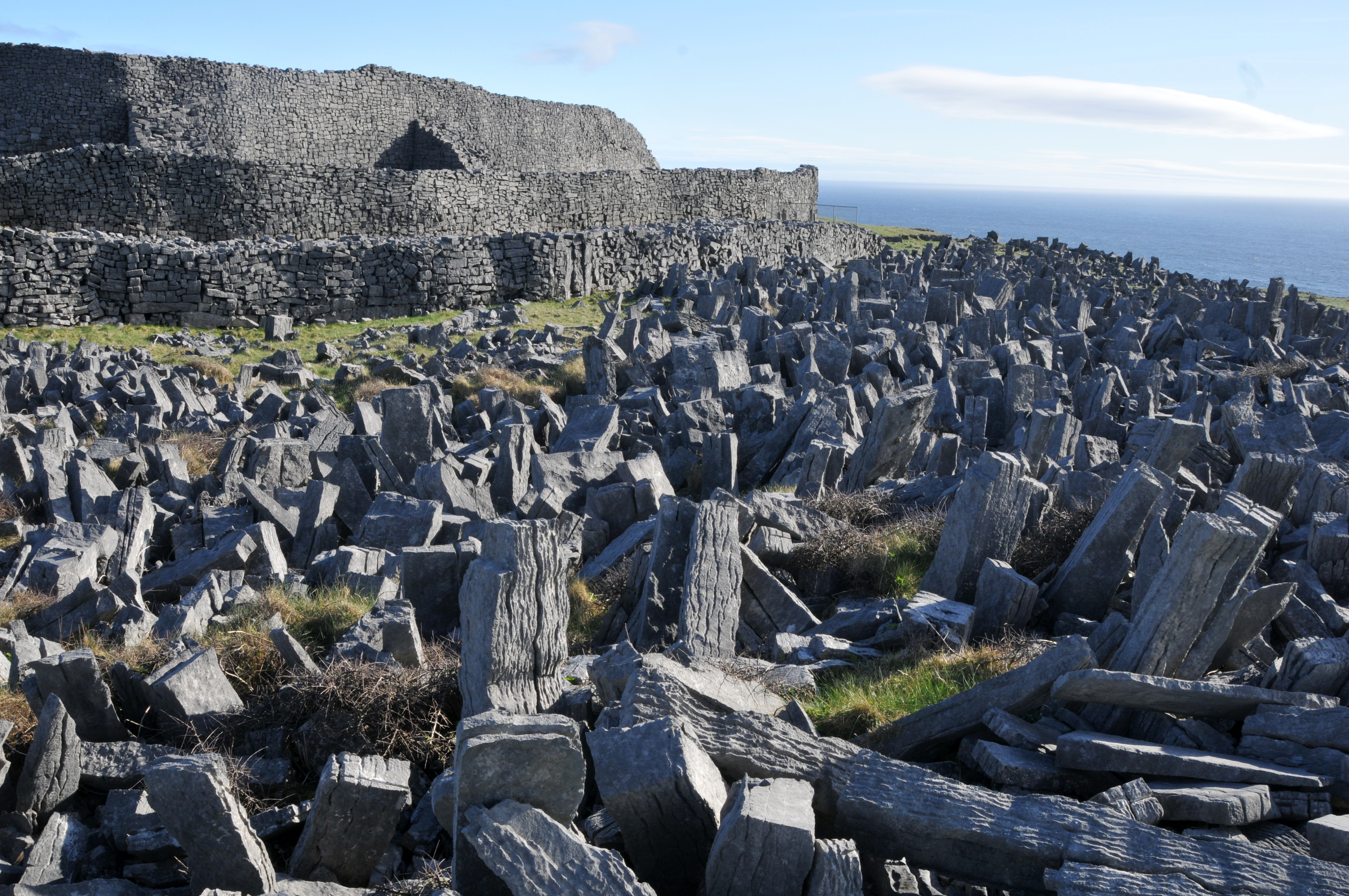
Cheval de frise on the west side of Dún Aonghasa

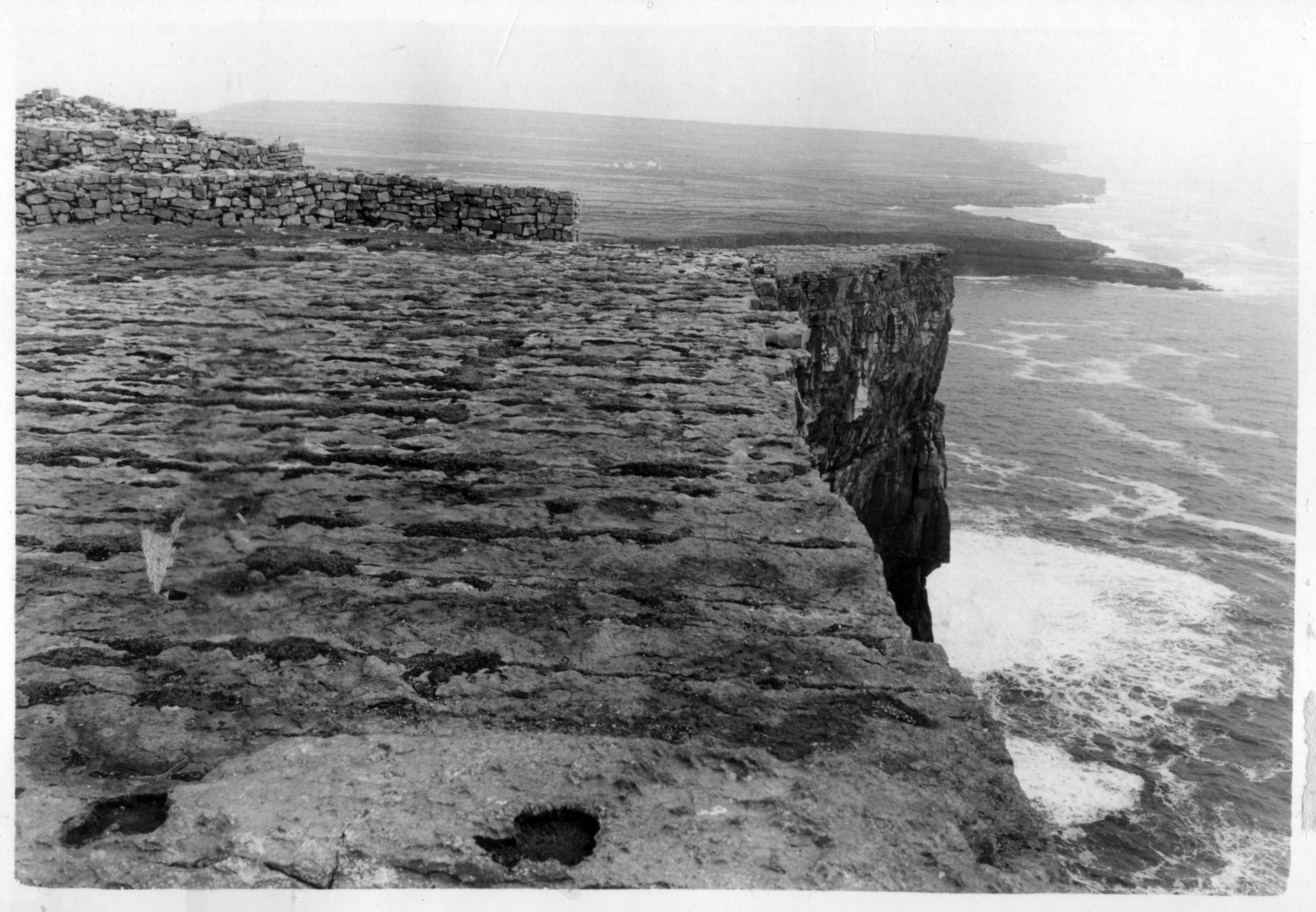
The cliffs at Dún Aonghasa

== See also ==
- Atlantic Bronze Age
