= Inisheer Rocket Crew =

Maritime rescue team on Inisheer, County Galway, Ireland

The Inisheer Rocket Crew were a group of men trained in maritime rescue, on Inisheer, one of the Aran Islands, County Galway off the coast of Ireland.

The MV Plassey was driven onto the rocks near Inisheer after heavy storms in 1960. Its crew of 11 men were trapped on the ship. The Rocket Crew rescued the entire crew from the stricken vessel using a breeches buoy. The breeches buoy had been in existence on the island since 1901, but had never been used prior to this. The Rocket Crew had only enough fuel to launch three rockets, and stood up in their necks in the water to rescue the crew.

The Rocket Crew consisted of Coleman Conneely, Andrew Conneely, Martin Conneely, Patrick Conneely x2, Liam Conneely, Joseph Conneely, Anne Conneely, Martin Folan, Martin Flaherty, Edward Flaherty, Sean Sharry, Martin Sharry, Thomas Costelloe, Martin O'Donnell, Patrick Griffin and Michael O'Donnell.

The event is captured in a pictorial display at the National Maritime Museum in Dún Laoghaire.

== Gallery ==
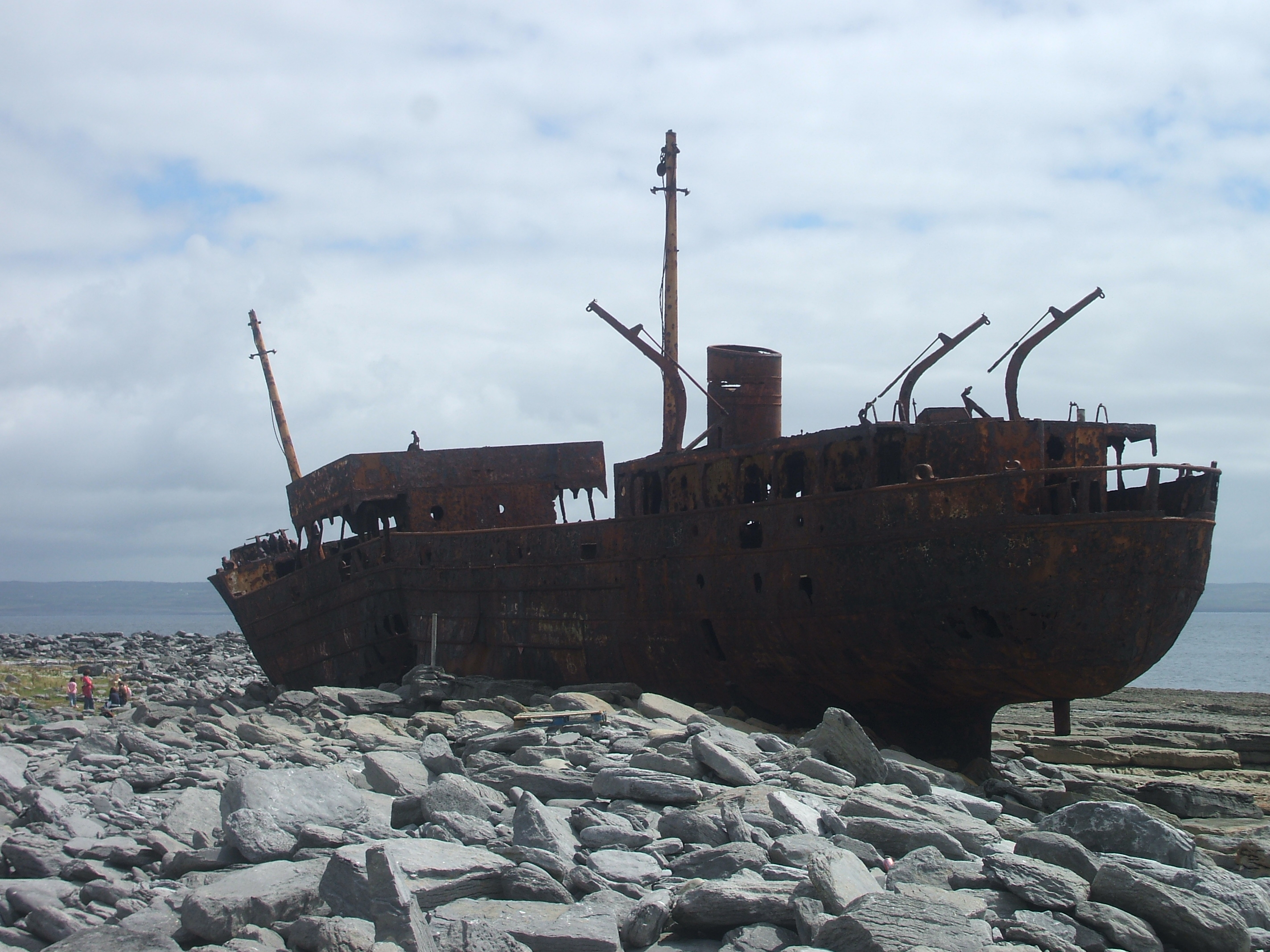
The wreck of the Plassey

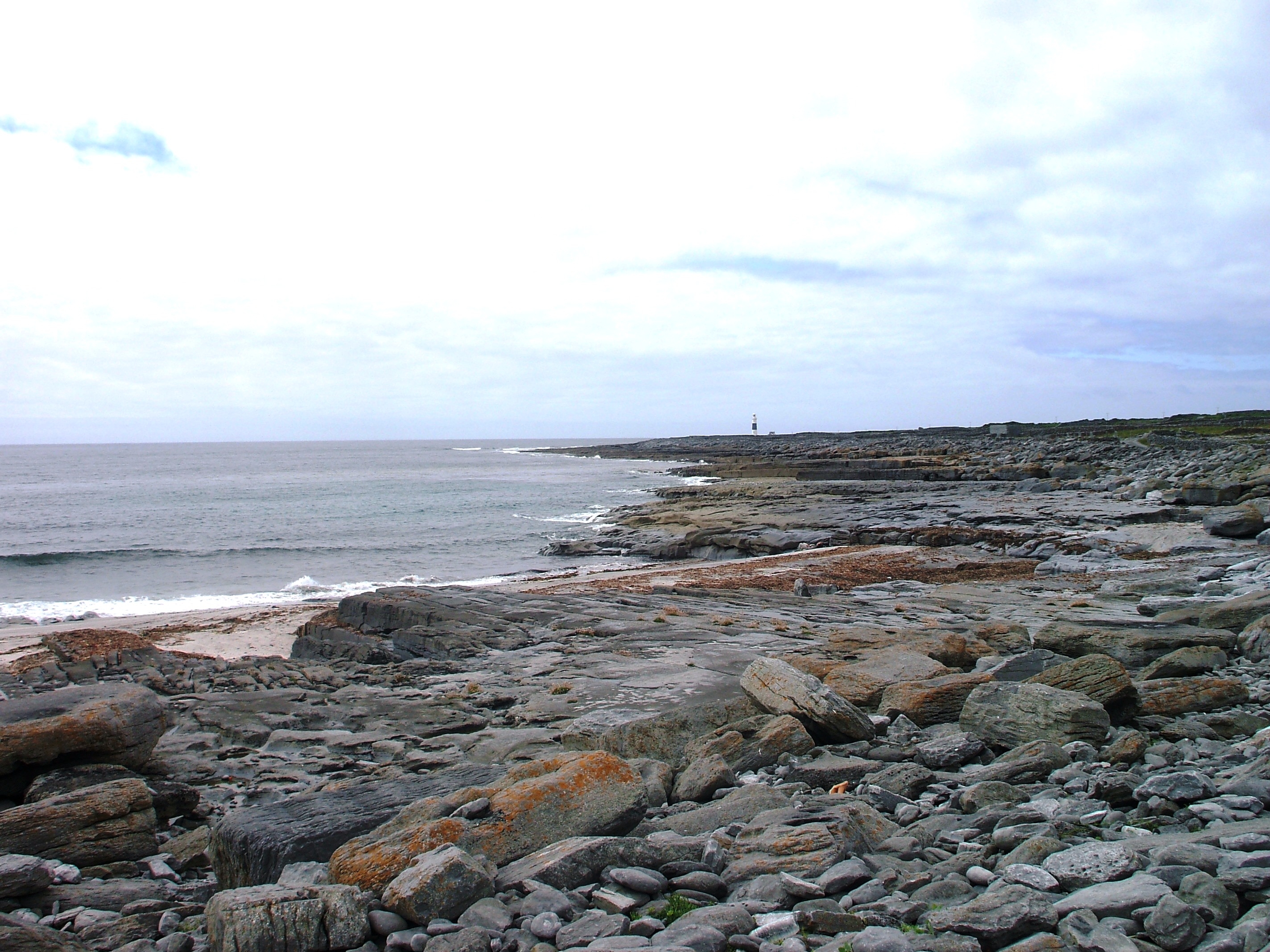
Inisheer Eastern coastline
