= Rónadh Cox =

Irish geologist

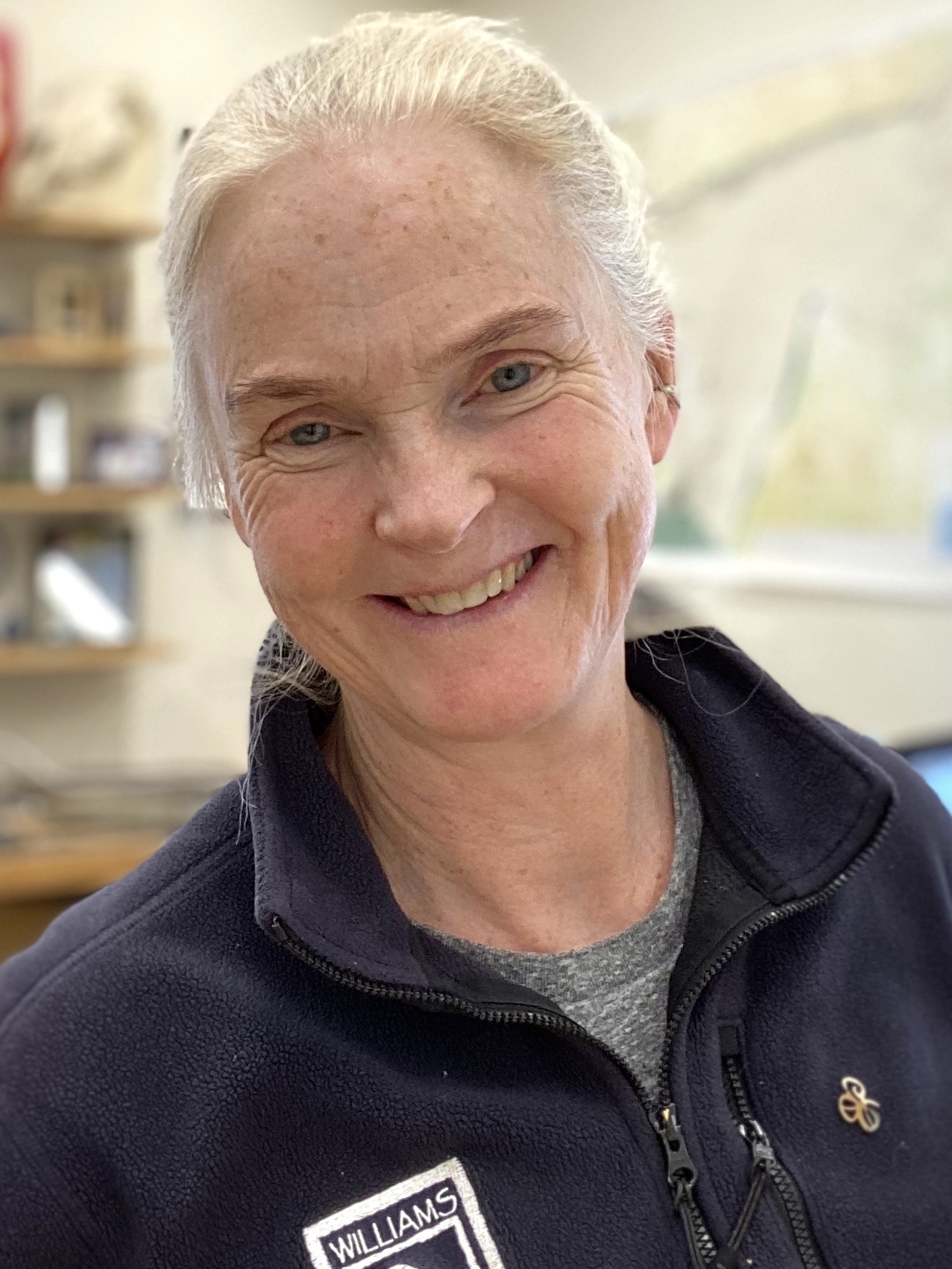
- Ronadh Cox (geologist)
- Born: 1962 (age 63–64); Dublin, Ireland
- Education: University College Dublin (BS); Stanford University
- Scientific career
- Workplaces: Rand Afrikaans University; Williams College
- Thesis: Sediment recycling, crustal development and compositional evolution of clastic sediments, southwestern United States (1993)

Rónadh Cox (born 1962) is an Irish geologist who is the Edward Brust Professor of Geology and Mineralogy at Williams College, Massachusetts. Her research considers the impact of storms on coastal boulders. She is a Member of the Royal Irish Academy and a Fellow of both the Geological Society of America and the American Association for the Advancement of Science.

== Early life and education ==
Cox is from Ireland. She says she became interested in geology as a teenager, because her geography teacher "delighted in the natural world,". She attended University College Dublin for her undergraduate degree, where she majored in geology. After earning her bachelor's degree, Cox moved to BP, where she worked as a geological assistant. She moved to the United States for her graduate research, joining Stanford University as a doctoral student. After earning her doctorate, Cox was appointed to the Rand Afrikaans University as a postdoctoral researcher. She spent two years in South Africa before returning to North America.

== Research and career ==
Cox joined the faculty at Williams College in 1996, and was eventually promoted to Edward Brust Professor of Geology and Mineralogy. In 2019 she was concurrently appointed a Visiting Professor in the School of Earth Sciences at UCD.

Cox's research considers how storm waves move boulders. She has studied the impact of strong storms (some equivalent to category 3 hurricanes) on Ireland's west coast, with focus on the Aran Islands. In particular, she showed that 2013-14 Atlantic winter storms in Europe moved numerous hundred-tonne boulders, so-called 'megagravel' the largest ever dislocated by the waves of storms. Her team also demonstrated formation of new boulders quarried from bedrock by wave action, well above sea level. In 2020, she was awarded a new grant from the National Science Foundation to study the dynamic evolution of boulder beaches.

From 2012 to 2016, Cox served as editor of the journal Geology, and went on to serve on the editorial board.

== Awards and honours ==
- 2013 Elected Fellow of the Geological Society of America
- 2020 Appointed Fellow of Future Earth Coasts
- 2020 EU Atlantic Strategy Atlantic Project Award
- 2020 Distinguished Service Award of the Geological Society of America
- 2021 Elected to the Royal Irish Academy
- 2022 Elected Fellow of the American Association for the Advancement of Science

== Selected publications ==
- Cox, Rónadh; Lowe, Donald R.; Cullers, R. L. (1 July 1995). "The influence of sediment recycling and basement composition on evolution of mudrock chemistry in the southwestern United States". Geochimica et Cosmochimica Acta. 59 (14): 2919–2940. Bibcode:1995GeCoA..59.2919C. doi:10.1016/0016-7037(95)00185-9. ISSN 0016-7037.
- Cox, Rónadh; Lowe, Donald R. (1995). "A Conceptual Review of Regional-Scale Controls on the Composition of Clastic Sediment and the Co-Evolution of Continental Blocks and their Sedimentary Cover". SEPM Journal of Sedimentary Research. 65A. doi:10.1306/d4268009-2b26-11d7-8648000102c1865d. ISSN 1527-1404.
- Cox, Rónadh; Armstrong, Richard A.; Ashwal, Lewis D. (1 November 1998). "Sedimentology, geochronology and provenance of the Proterozoic Itremo Group, central Madagascar, and implications for pre-Gondwana palaeogeography". Journal of the Geological Society. 155 (6): 1009–1024. Bibcode:1998JGSoc.155.1009C. doi:10.1144/gsjgs.155.6.1009. ISSN 0016-7649. S2CID 128493704.
- Cox, Rónadh; Jahn, Kalle L.; Watkins, Oona G.; Cox, Peter (2018). "Extraordinary boulder transport by storm waves (west of Ireland, winter 2013-2014) and criteria for analysing coastal boulder deposits". Earth-Science Reviews. 177: 623–636. Bibcode:2018ESRv..177..623C. doi:10.1016/j.earscirev.2017.12.014.

== Personal life ==
Whilst a doctoral student in California, Cox met her husband, Mark Brandriss.
