= Clíodhna Lyons =

Irish cartoonist, animator and printmaker

- Born: Aran Islands, County Galway
- Website: www.ztoical.com

Clíodhna Lyons is an Irish cartoonist, animator and printmaker. She has created several comics and zines and is a director working for Lighthouse Studios.

== Biography ==
Lyons was born in the Aran Islands, Galway, and studied animation at Ballyfermot College in Dublin before going to complete a BFA in comics at the School of Visual Arts in New York City. Lyons has worked with a number of other artists such as Maeve Clancy. Lyons is now based in Kilkenny and travels to Dublin regularly for comics-related events such as 24 Hour Comics Day which she helps run.

== Filmography ==
Year	Title	Role	Type
2024	Póg mo Pigeon	Director	Animated Short
2023	Rick and Morty	Assistant Director	TV Series
2022	El Deafo	Assistant Director	Limited Series
2021	Little Ellen	Assistant Director	TV Series
2020	Powerbirds	Episode Director	TV Series
