= MV Plassy =

Cargo ship wrecked off Inisheer, Island

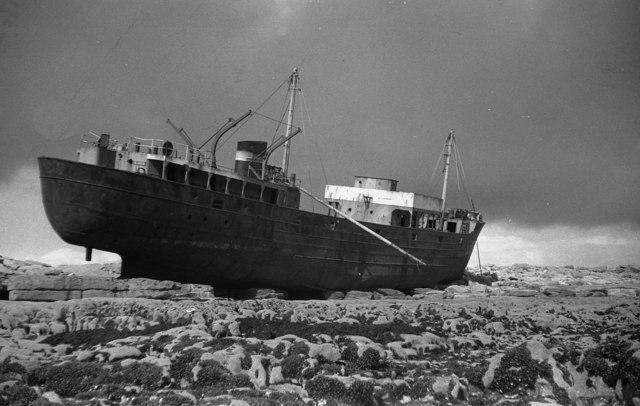
- Plassy aground, photographed in 1962

History

United Kingdom
- Name: Juliet
- Namesake: Juliet
- Builder: Cook, Welton & Gemmell, Beverley
- Yard number: 669
- Laid down: 23 May 1940
- Launched: 2 October 1940
- Commissioned: 20 Mar 1941
- Renamed: Renamed Peterjon in 1947; Renamed Plassy in 1951
- Identification: Pennant: T 136
- Fate: converted to cargo vessel, sold 1947

History

United Kingdom
- Name: Plassy (or Plassey)
- Namesake: Plassey, County Limerick
- Owner: Limerick Steamship Company
- Operator: Roycroft Ltd
- Port of registry: London
- Acquired: 1951
- Fate: Wrecked on 8 March 1960; 53°3.3502′N 9°30.2175′W

General characteristics
- Class & type: Shakespearian-class trawler
- Type: coastal trading vessel
- Displacement: 545 tons
- Length: 164.0 ft (50.0 m)
- Beam: 27.8 ft (8.5 m)
- Draught: 11.0 ft (3.4 m)
- Propulsion: single screw; 1941: Triple expansion steam engine, 1 shaft, 850ihp; 1947: 8-cylinder 2S.C.SA Diesel
- Speed: 12.25 knots (22.69 km/h)
- Armament: 1 × 12 pounder 76 mm (3.0 in) gun; 3 × Oerlikon 20 mm AA guns; 30 × depth charges

MV Plassy, or Plassey, was a cargo ship in the Irish Merchant Service, operating during the 1950s. It was built as HMS Juliet, a Shakespearian-class naval trawler of the Royal Navy at the start of the Second World War, and sold into merchant service at the end of the conflict. As Plassy it was wrecked in a storm off Inisheer, and is best known as the wreck seen on the foreshore of 'Craggy Island' in the TV comedy, Father Ted.

== As Juliet ==
Juliet was built by Cook, Welton & Gemmell at Beverley, Yorkshire, at the beginning of World War II. It was ordered on 12 December 1939 and laid down the following May. It was launched on 2 October 1940 and entered service with the Royal Navy on 20 March 1941 as a minesweeper. Juliet served in home waters until November 1942 when it took part in Operation Torch, the Allied landings in French North Africa. Thereafter it worked in the Mediterranean. At the end of the conflict Juliet was no longer required by the Royal Navy and in 1947 it was converted into a cargo vessel and sold into the British Merchant service as Peterjon.

== As Plassy ==
In 1951 it was acquired by the Limerick Steamship Company and renamed Plassy after the Plassey area near Limerick, which was in turn named after Robert Clive (Baron Plassey), who took his title from the 1757 Battle of Plassey, in India. As Plassy (sometimes spelled Plassey) it operated around the coast of Ireland carrying general cargo until her loss in 1960.

== Fate ==
On 8 March 1960, while sailing through Galway Bay carrying a cargo of whiskey, stained glass and yarn, it was caught in a severe storm and ran onto Finnis Rock, Inisheer, Aran Islands.

A group of local Islanders, the Inisheer Rocket Crew, rescued the entire crew from the stricken vessel using a breeches buoy; an event captured in a pictorial display at the National Maritime Museum in Dún Laoghaire.

Several weeks later, a second storm washed the ship off the rock and drove it ashore on the island.

== The wreck today ==
The wreck still lies on the shoreline and is a tourist attraction. It is visible in the opening credits of the television series Father Ted. In early January 2014, Storm Christine shifted the wreck's position on the coast for the first time since 1991.

== Gallery ==
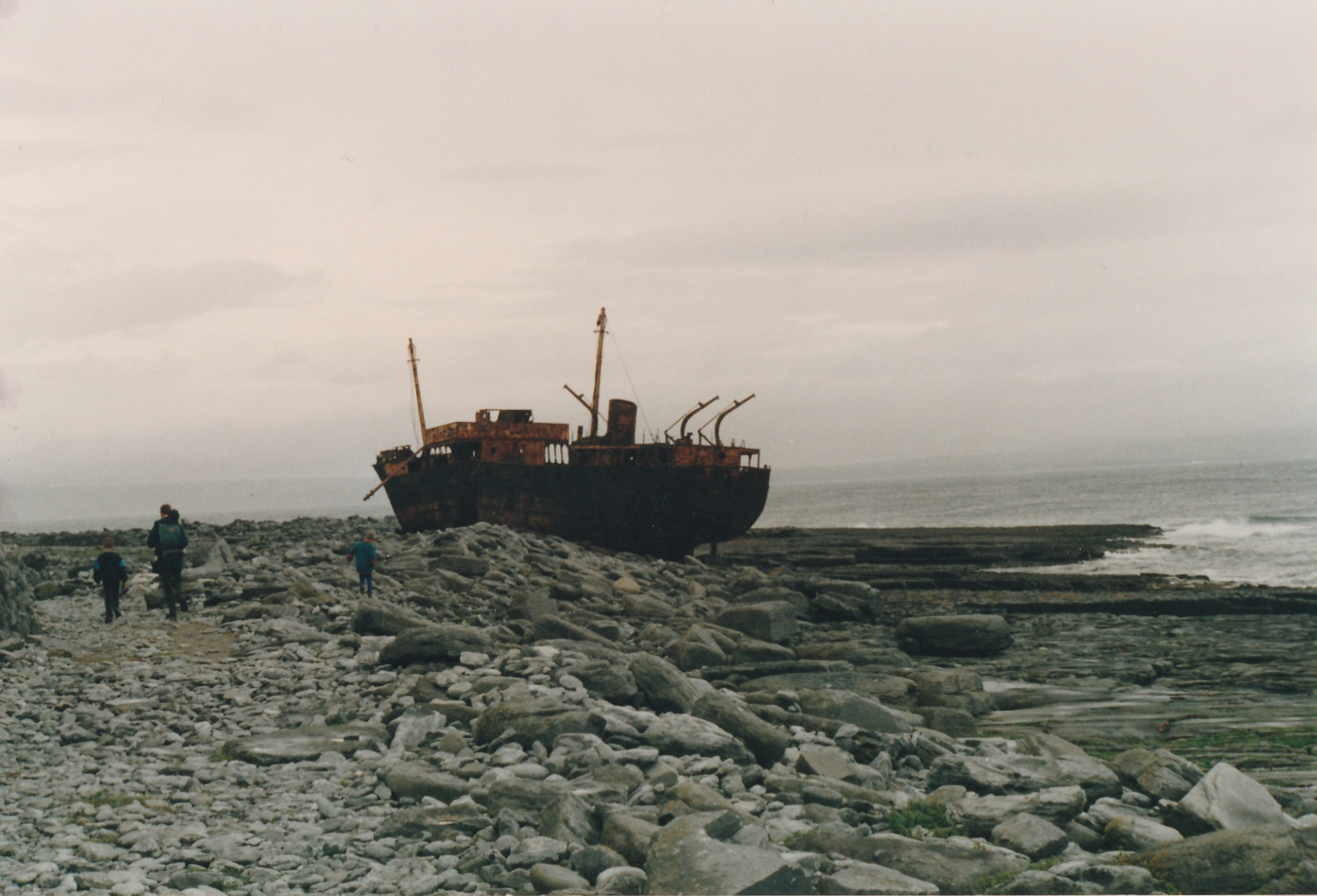
The wreck, July 1991

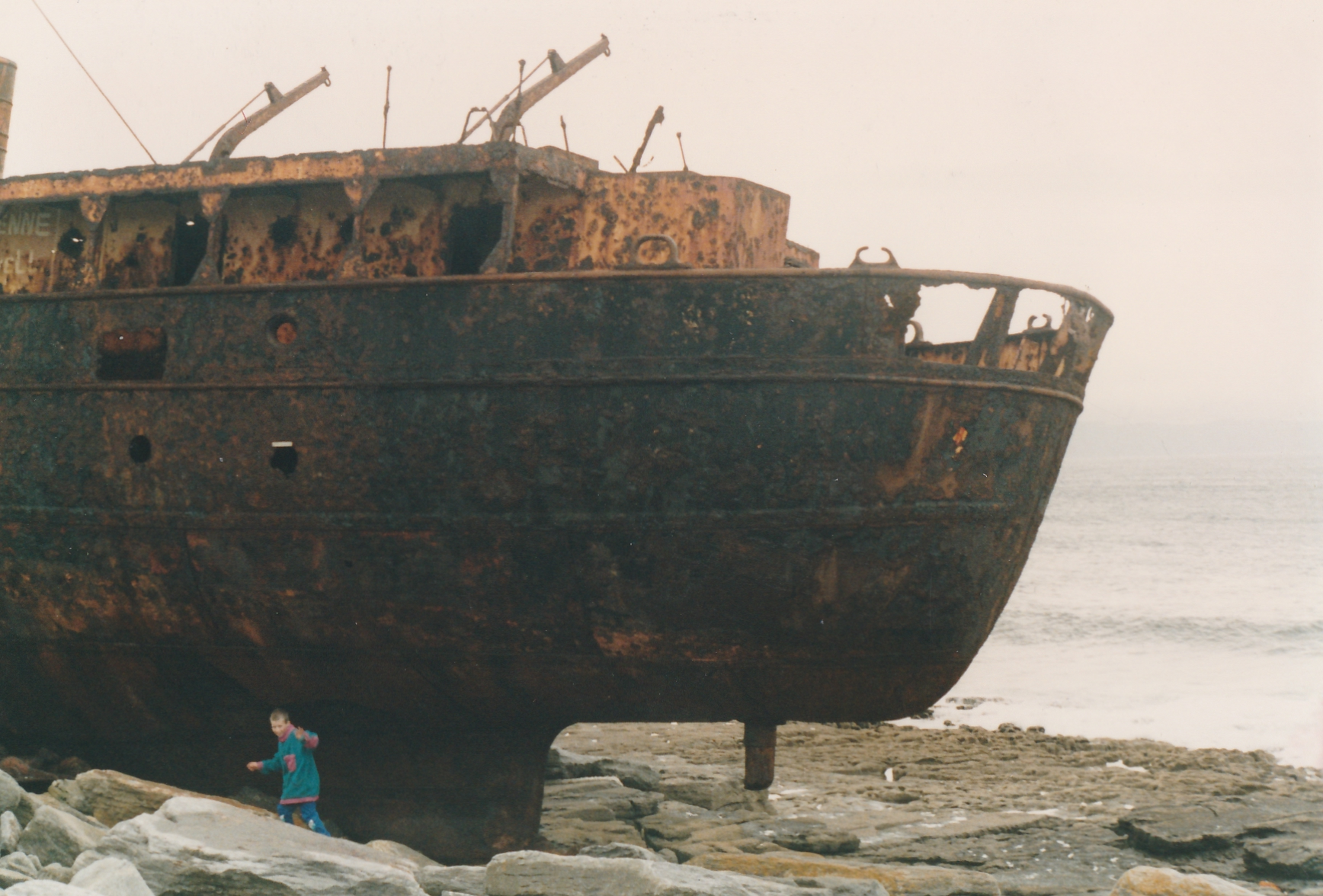
The stern of the wreck, July 1991

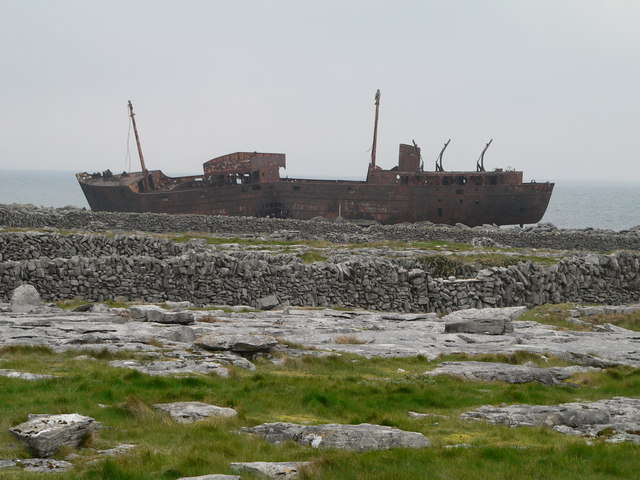
The wreck, 2005

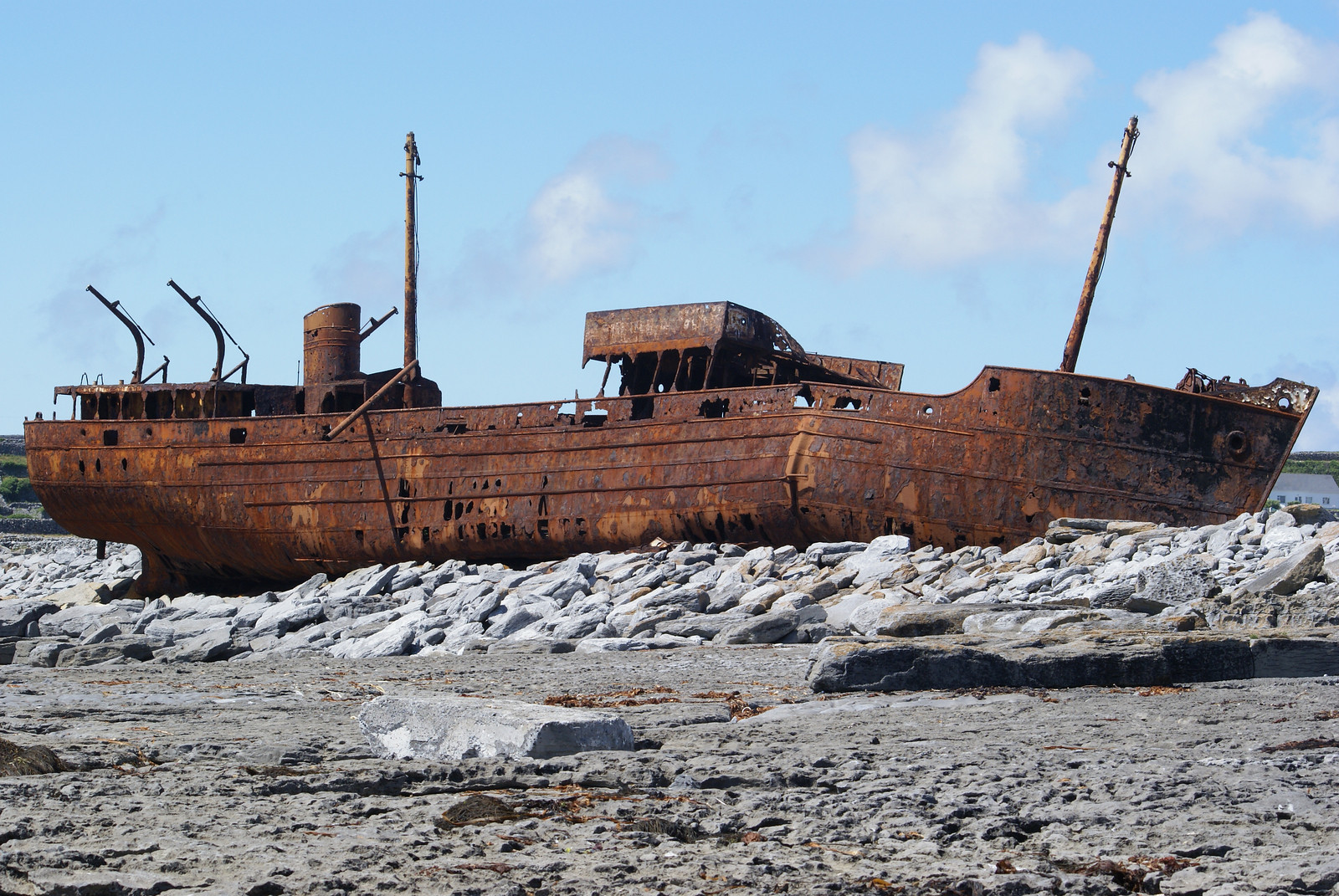
The wreck, June 2010

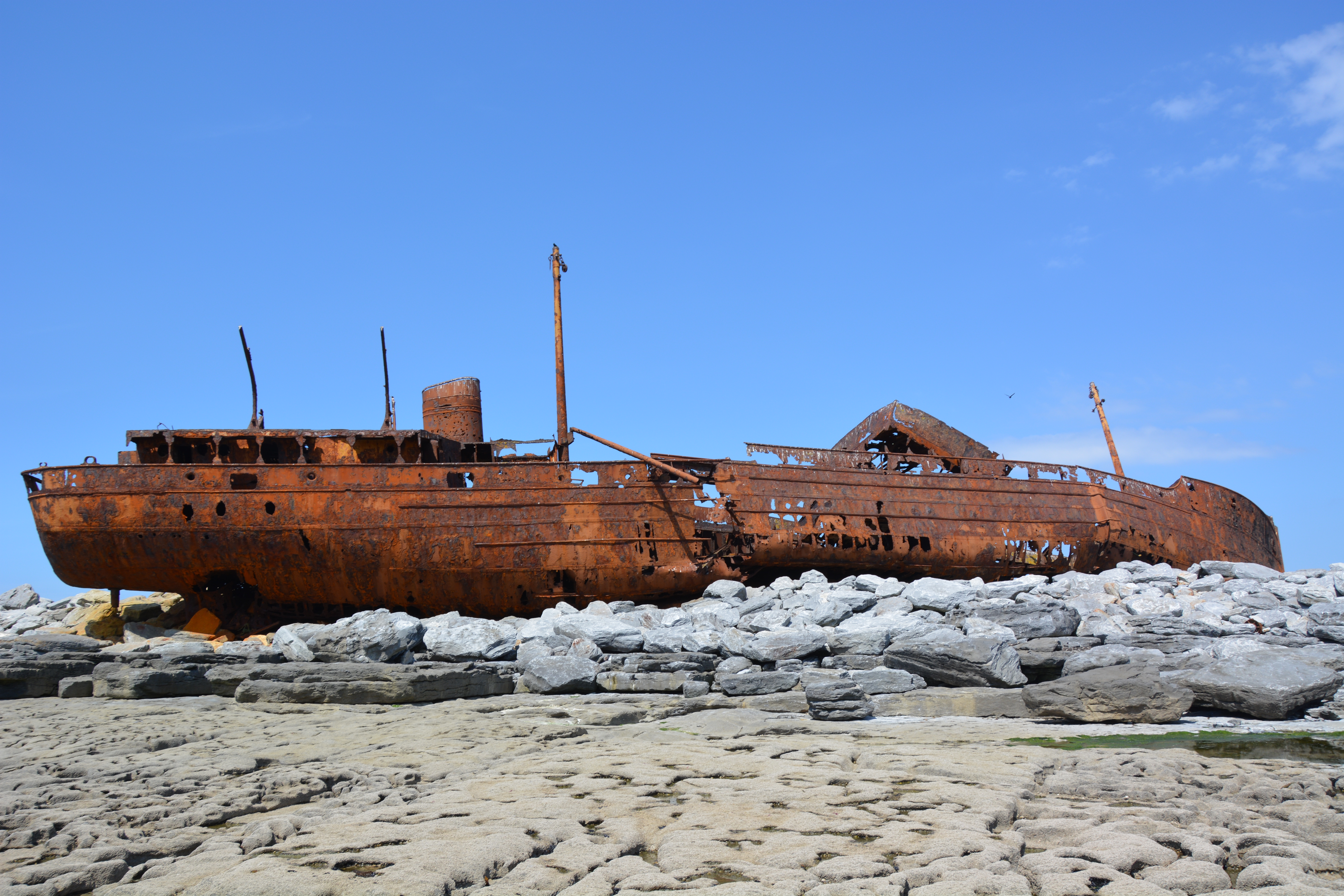
The wreck, June 2016

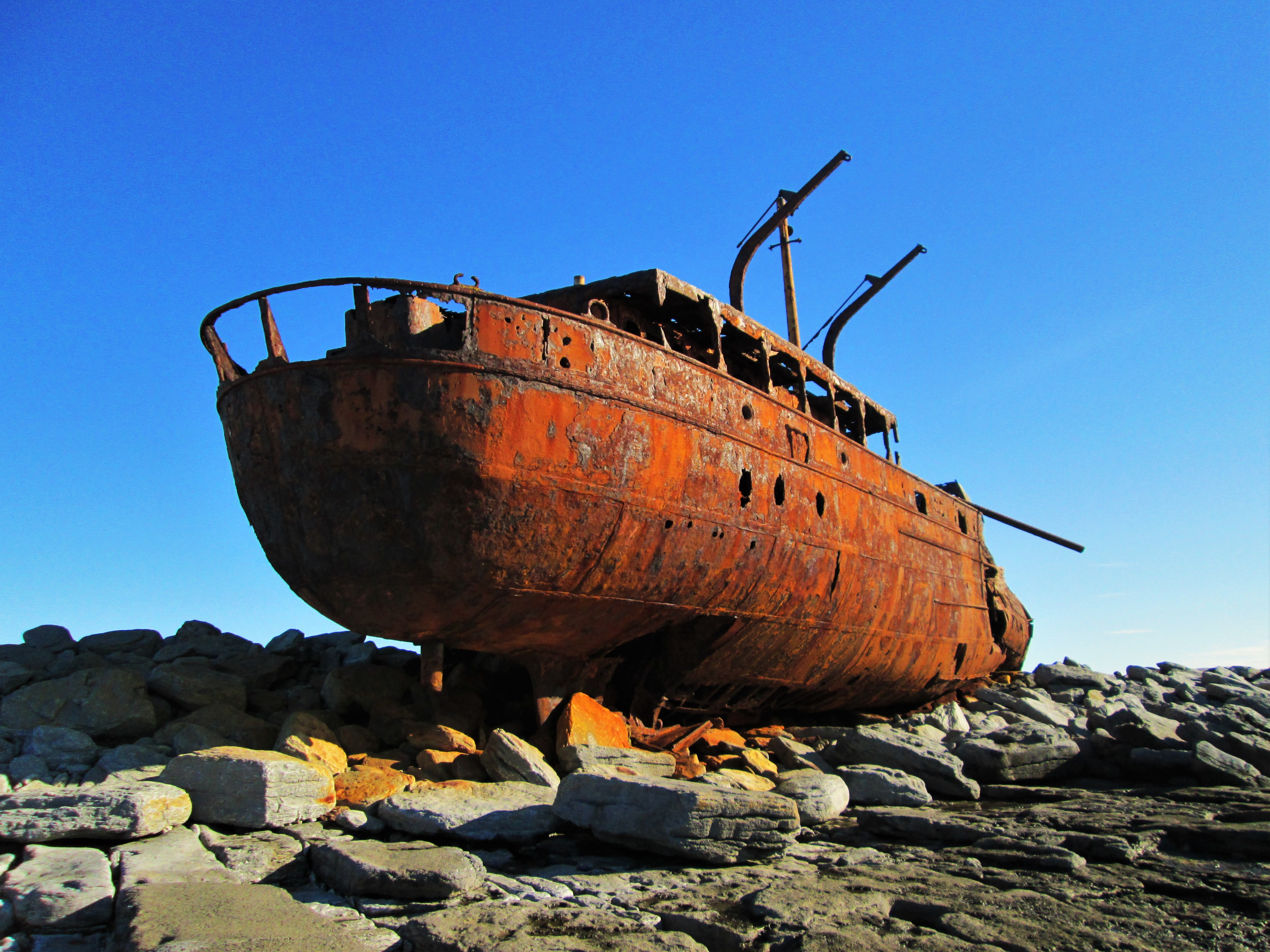
The wreck, October 2016
