= Inis Beag =

Pseudonymous Irish island used by John Cowan Messenger

Coordinates: 53.399°N 9.897°W

Inis Beag (Irish, 'Little Island') is a pseudonymous Irish island in the 1960s, as described by American cultural anthropologist John Cowan Messenger. Messenger lived on the island and studied the community in 1959 and 1960. He subsequently wrote several academic works about his experience, including Inis Beag: Isle of Ireland and Sex and Repression in an Irish Folk Community.

== Location ==
Messenger describes Inis Beag as a remote island off the coast of Connemara, Ireland, near the Aran Islands in the 1960s. It contains a small, isolated, Irish-speaking, Catholic population. Messenger states that during the period of his study between 1958 and 1966, Inis Beag supported a population of around 350, mostly living by subsistence farming and fishing. The name "Inis Beag" is a pseudonym and was used by Messenger to protect the privacy of the island's people. Subsequent texts have stated that the island's true identity is Inisheer.

== Island life ==
Messenger characterises the Gaelic revival movement as nativism. He states that members of the revival and those involved in the Irish independence movement held up the island the surrounding areas as examples of true Irish identity. Messenger argues that many of the written works by these members were "romanticized," focusing on cultural forms that outsiders found attractive. These included "the traditional garb of the folk, their skill in rowing the famed canoe, called curach, the manner in which they manufacture soils and grow in them a variety of crops, and their Gaelic speech."

Messenger argues that these customs were as not as pure as other outsiders stated. He found that 11 of the 111 adult males and 9 of the 85 adult females had given up the traditional local clothing for imported styles from the mainland. This behaviour was especially prevalent among the younger women, with no adherents between the ages of 18 and 29. He also found that use of the local curach had declined in recent decades, from 30 to 50 three-man crews fishing nearly all year in the early 1900s to nine crews working from the island in 1960. Messenger found that essentially all of the islanders older than eight spoke English proficiently, mixed English regularly into their speech, and even confessed to their priests in English. He attributed the rise in English to a practical view of language; many young people emigrate and would be disadvantaged by speaking only Irish.

== Sexuality ==
Messenger reported that Inis Beag had no formal sex education, and sexual intercourse was treated by both sexes and the local curate as a "duty" which must be "endured." Messenger proposed that the institutionalisation of repression of sexual conduct was due to early replacement of physical affection with verbal affection by the time a child can walk. He stated that "any forms of direct or indirect sexual expression—masturbation, mutual exploration of bodies, use of either standard or slang words relating to sex, and open urination and defecation" were "punished severely by word and deed." He found that children were separated by gender in almost all activities. He also reported that islanders tended to bathe only the hands, face, and feet and developed an "obsessive fear" of nudity early in life. In some households, "dogs [were] whipped for licking their genitals and soon [learned] to indulge in this behavior outside when unobserved."

He argues that repression of sexuality also manifested in intercourse. Elders of the island boasted that there was no premarital sex, although some young men did admit to it in rumor. Messenger states that when couples did have sex with each other the husband always initiated and the wife was commonly passive. Messenger found that couples left their underclothes only partially removed and used only the male superior position, and when the man orgasmed, he fell asleep almost immediately.

Messenger argues that people of the island behaved like this due to informal and formal social control and extreme ignorance. He states that menstruation and menopause were regarded with profound misgivings. He states that women asked Messenger's wife about the female cycle more than any other question about sex phenomena. He states that young women were often traumatized by menarche, and that in 1960 at least three older women had confined themselves entirely to bed to avoid a potential "madness" induced by menopause. Women sent their children out of the room when Messenger's wife would inquire about their pregnancies.

Messenger viewed the men as grossly ignorant about sex. He found that female orgasm was unknown to the men, not experienced by the women, or shunned and hidden. Messenger reported that one middle-aged bachelor who considered himself "wise in the ways of the outside world . . . described the violent bodily reactions of a girl to his fondling" and when Messenger explained, he "admitted not knowing that women also could achieve climax." Men of the island thought sexual intercourse would weaken them, and would abstain the night before an exhausting task. Despite all this, Messenger could not report a single family that was childless due to ignorance. He states that this was a phenomenon in some other regions of Ireland. When Messenger inquired how newly married couples learned how to copulate, he was told that "after marriage, nature takes its course."

== Reception ==
In Marriage in Ireland, a collection of essays edited by Art Cosgrove covering history of marriage practices and norms in Ireland from the 8th century to the 1980s, Trinity College Dublin historian David Fitzpatrick is critical of this work. He describes Messenger's account in Inis Beag (1969), along with two other American anthropological works on Irish society from that time as “highly coloured”. In the context of these works he states that Irish post-famine sexual mores were common across European peasant communities. He argues that if Ireland was sick (as implied by these works), so was rural Europe.

== Bibliography ==
- A more recent edition, with an ISBN, is: Messenger, John C. Inis Beag: Isle of Ireland. Long Grove: IL: Waveland Press, 1983. ISBN 0-88133-051-5, OCLC 10578752
- John C. Messenger, "Sex and Repression in an Irish Folk Community", in Donald S. Marshall and Robert C. Suggs, eds., Human Sexual Behavior: Variations in the Ethnographic Spectrum, 1971. Basic Books, New York.
- John C. Messenger, Ines Beag Revisited: The Anthropologist as Observant Participator. Publisher: Salem, Wisconsin: Sheffield, 1989. ISBN 0-88133-408-1
- John Messenger, Peasants, Proverbs, and Projection. Central Issues in Anthropology April 1991, Vol. 9, No. 1: pp. 99–105 doi:10.1525/cia.1991.9.1.100
