= Dún Dúchathair =

Stone fort in County Galway, Ireland

Coordinates: 53°6′16.40″N 9°41′15.25″W

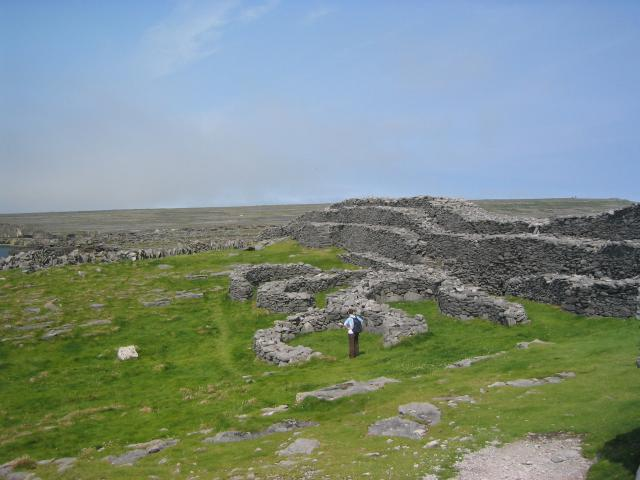
Dúchathair

Dún Dúchathair or simply Dúchathair (anglicized Doocaher), meaning "black fort", is a large stone fort on the cliffs at Cill Éinne, (Killeany), Inishmore (one of the Aran Islands) in County Galway, Ireland. Due to erosion, it now sits on a rocky promontory that stretches out into the sea. On its outer side there are large walls, reaching 6 metres high and 5 metres wide. On the inside are the ruins of clocháns (beehive huts) but no water supply. There is also evidence of a cheval de frise protecting the entrance.

Its age is unknown.
