= Earth-Science Reviews =

- Discipline: Earth sciences
- Language: English
- Edited by: A. Chin, C. Doglioni, J.L. Florsheim, M.F.J. Flower, G.R. Foulger, A. Gómez-Tuena, S. Khan, S. Marriott, A.D. Miall, G.F. Panza, J.A. Sanchez-Cabeza, M. Strecker, E.S. Takle, M. Widdowson, P.B. Wignall

Publication details
- History: 1966–present
- Publisher: Elsevier
- Frequency: Monthly
- Impact factor: 12.413 (2020)

Standard abbreviations
- ISO 4: Earth-Sci. Rev.

Indexing
- CODEN: ESREAV
- ISSN: 0012-8252
- LCCN: 66009960
- OCLC no.: 641015272

Links
- Journal homepage; Online access

Earth-Science Reviews is a monthly peer-reviewed scientific journal published by Elsevier. It covers all aspects of Earth sciences. The editors-in-chief for this journal are A. Chin, C. Doglioni, J.L. Florsheim, M.F.J. Flower, G.R. Foulger, A. Gómez-Tuena, S. Khan, S. Marriott, A.D. Miall, G.F. Panza, J.A. Sanchez-Cabeza, M. Strecker, E.S. Takle, M. Widdowson, and P.B. Wignall.

== Abstracting and indexing ==
This journal is abstracted and indexed by:

- Science Citation Index
- Current Contents/Physical, Chemical & Earth Sciences
- The Zoological Record
- Chemical Abstracts Service
- Bibliography and Index of Geology
- GEOBASE
- Inspec
- PASCAL
- Physics Abstracts
- Scopus

According to the Journal Citation Reports, the journal has a 2012 impact factor of 7.339.
