= Aran Islands =

Group of three islands off the west coast of Ireland

Native name: Oileáin Árann
- Location of the Aran Islands

Geography
- Location: Galway Bay
- Coordinates: 53.0971°N 9.6326°W
- Total islands: 3
- Major islands: Inishmore (Árainn); Inishmaan (Inis Meáin); Inisheer (Inis Oírr)
- Area: 46 km^{2} (18 sq mi)
- Highest elevation: 120 m (390 ft)
- Highest point: Cliffs near Dún Aonghasa

Administration
- Ireland
- County: County Galway
- Province: Connacht

Demographics
- Population: 1,347 (2022)
- Languages: Irish; English

Additional information
- Time zone: WET (UTC±0)
  - Summer (DST): IST (UTC+1)
- Official website: www.aranislands.ie

The Aran Islands (/ˈærən/ ARR-ən; Irish: Oileáin Árann, pronounced [əˈlʲaːnʲ ˈaːɾˠən̪ˠ]) or The Arans (na hÁrainneacha [n̪ˠə ˈhaːɾˠən̠ʲəxə]), are a group of three islands at the mouth of Galway Bay, off the west coast of Ireland, with a combined area of about 46 km^{2} (18 mi^{2}). They form the historic barony of Aran in County Galway.

From west to east, the islands are Inishmore (Árainn / Inis Mór), (Note: The official Irish name for the largest island is Árainn, but the British Ordnance Survey created the name Inishmore in the 19th century, likely to avoid confusion with Arranmore (also known as Aran Island) in County Donegal. The Gaelicised form Inis Mór has since become widely used.) the largest; Inishmaan (Inis Meáin), the second-largest; and Inisheer (Inis Oírr), the smallest. Several smaller islets also lie in the group.

The population of 1,347 (as of 2022) primarily speaks Irish, making the islands part of the Gaeltacht. Most residents are also fluent or proficient in English. The population has declined steadily since 1841, when it was approximately 3,500.

== Location and access ==
The bay between the Aran Islands and the mainland divides as follows:

- North Sound / An Súnda ó Thuaidh (more accurately Bealach Locha Lurgan) lies between Inishmore and Lettermullen, County Galway.
- Gregory's Sound / Súnda Ghríoghóra (formerly known as Bealach na h-Áite) lies between Inishmore and Inishmaan.
- Foul Sound / An Súnda Salach (formerly known as Bealach na Fearbhaighe) lies between Inishmaan and Inisheer.
- South Sound / An Súnda ó Dheas (formerly known as Bealach na Fínnise) lies between Inisheer and County Clare.

Ferries operate year-round to all three islands from Rossaveal in County Galway, and there is also a seasonal service from Doolin in County Clare.

From Connemara Airport near Inverin flights are operated by Aer Arann Islands.

== History ==
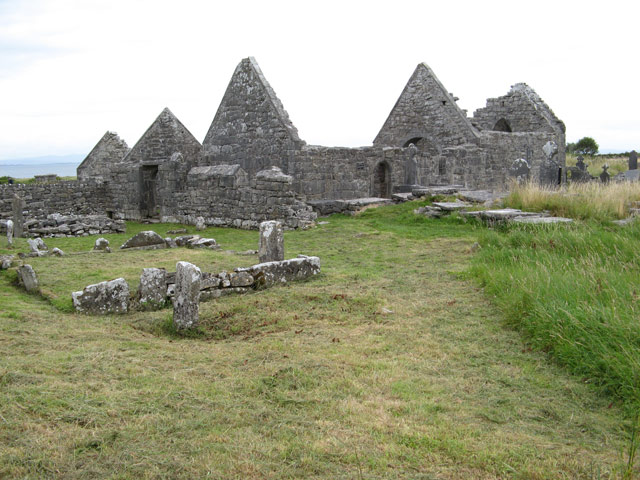
Teampall Brecan, Inishmore

Little is known about the first inhabitants to cross over to the islands, but they likely came across in search of a safe haven from attack. The islands are made up of Carboniferous limestone and have no naturally occurring topsoil. Early settlers augmented the soil with seaweed and sand from the shore. Drystone walls were built to protect the soil. Seven prehistoric stone forts are on the islands. Dún Aonghasa, on Inishmore, dates to 1100 BC.

Enda of Aran founded the Killeany monastery in Inishmore, AD 490. It became a centre of learning, piety, and asceticism. Also on Inishmore is Tempull Breccain, the fifth-century Church of Saint Brecan. A ringfort on Inisheer, called Dún Formna, became the site of a castle built by the O'Briens around the 15th century. Cromwell's soldiers destroyed the castle and all but two of the seven churches established by Brecan.

In 1693 the islands were briefly captured and held by Jacobite privateer Thomas Vaughan, whose crew plundered Protestant settlements there.

The typical settlement was a clachan, a scattered cluster of small, single-storey cottages with thatched roofs. Typical clothing for an Aran man was homespun trousers and waistcoats made of grey or light-brown tweed; for women, a calf-length woven skirt along with a knitted sweater. Aran knitters were highly skilled. In the 1820s, harvesting kelp was an important sideline to raise money for the land rents. Salvaging flotsam often produced wood for building and fuel..

In 1898, John Millington Synge started spending his summers in the Aran Islands. His 1904 play Riders to the Sea is set on Inishmaan. He published The Aran Islands, six plays set in or strongly influenced by his time in Aran.

== Geology ==
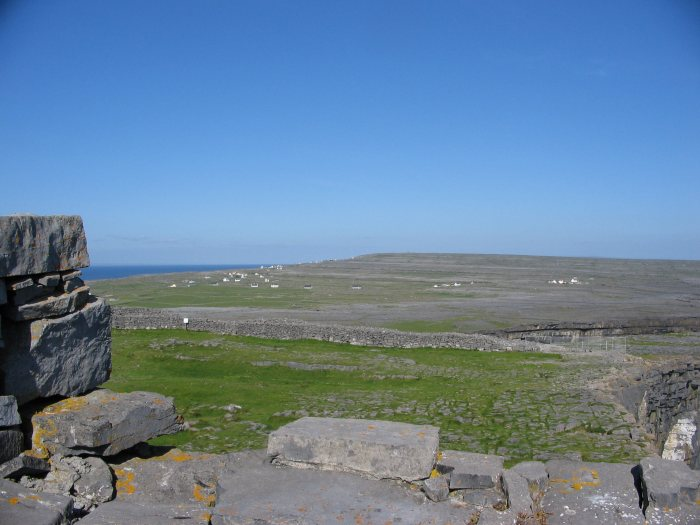
A view over the karst landscape on Inishmore, from Dún Aonghasa, an ancient stone fort

The islands' geology is mainly karst limestone, related to the limestone plateau of the Burren in County Clare (to the east), not the granites of Connemara to the north. This is most obvious in the construction of the walls around the fields.

The limestones date from the Viséan age of the Lower Carboniferous, formed as sediments in a tropical sea approximately 350 million years ago, and compressed into horizontal strata with fossil corals, crinoids, sea urchins, and ammonites. Glaciation following the Namurian facilitated greater denudation. The result is that the Aran Islands are one of the finest examples of a Glacio-Karst landscape in the world. The effects of the last glacial period (the Midlandian) are most in evidence, with the islands overrun by ice during this glaciation. The impact of earlier karstification (solutional erosion) has been eliminated by the last glacial period. Any karstification now seen dates from around 11,000 years ago, so the island karst is recent.

Solutional processes have widened and deepened the grykes of the limestone pavement. Pre-existing lines of weakness in the rock (vertical joints) contribute to the formation of extensive fissures separated by clints (flat, pavement-like slabs). The rock karstification facilitates the formation of subterranean drainage.

== Coastal geomorphology ==
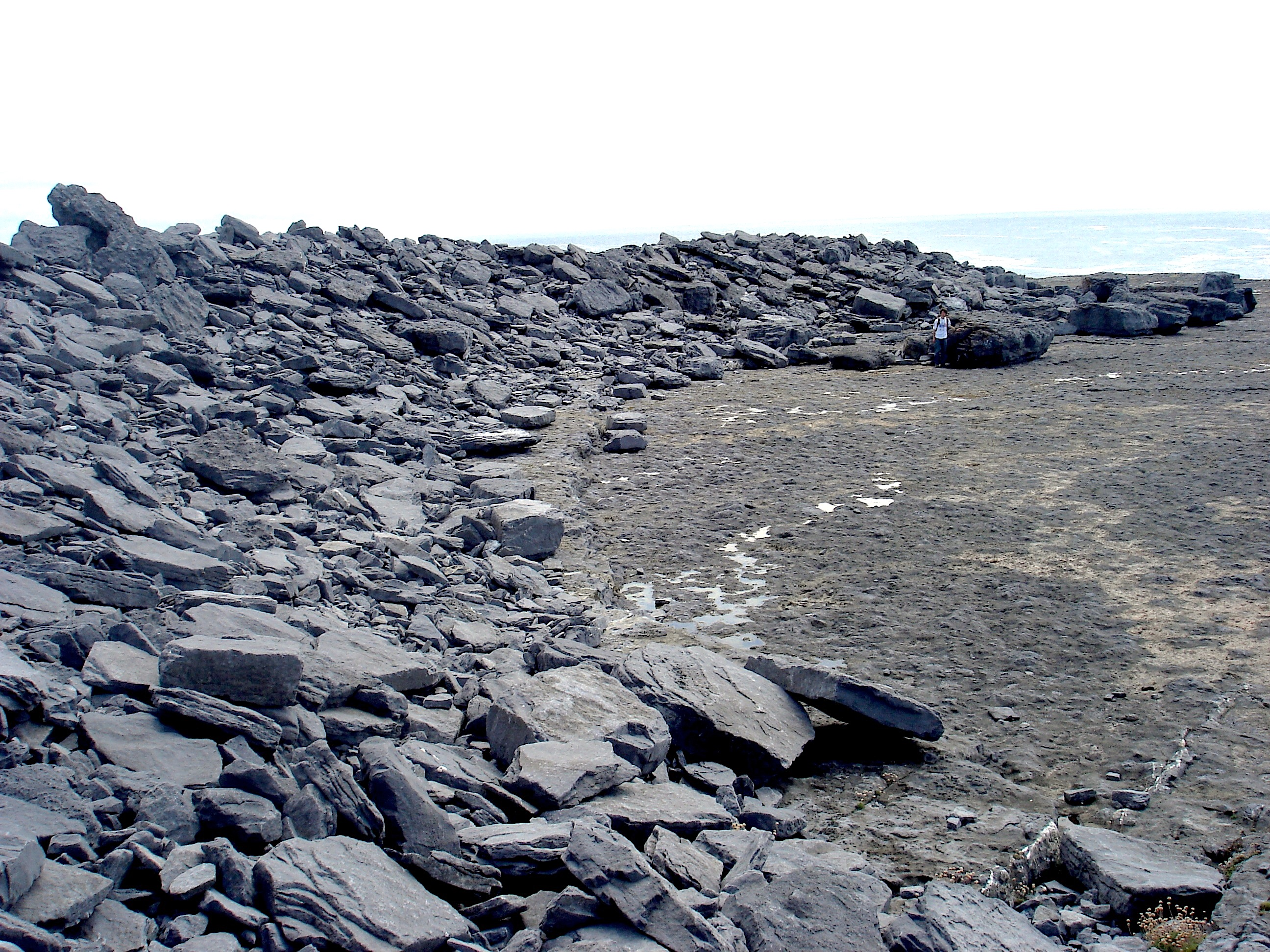
Coastal boulder deposits on the west coast of Inishmore. Person standing next to the large boulder on the bedrock platform gives a sense of scale. This is about 16 m above sea level and 90 m inland.

Huge boulders up to 50 m (160 ft) above the sea at parts of the west-facing cliffs are an extreme form of storm beach, cast there by waves. Previously considered possible tsunami deposits, these coastal boulder deposits have recently been shown (by Rónadh Cox and collaborators) to be definitively the work of storms.

== Climate and agriculture ==
The islands have an unusually temperate climate. Average air temperatures range from 15 °C (59 °F) in July to 6 °C (43 °F) in January. The soil temperature does not usually drop below 6 °C (43 °F) (the winter of 2010 recorded a prolonged period of snow, the first in living memory). Since grass will grow once the temperature rises above 6 °C (43 °F), this means that the island (like the neighbouring Burren) has one of the longest growing seasons in Ireland or Britain, and supports diverse and rich plant growth. Late May is the sunniest time and also likely the best time to view flowers, with the gentians and avens peaking (but orchid species blooming later).

== Population ==
Historical population

Year	Pop.	±%
1841	3,521	—
1851	3,333	−5.3%
1861	3,291	−1.3%
1871	3,038	−7.7%
1881	3,148	+3.6%
1891	2,890	−8.2%
1901	2,845	−1.6%
1911	2,668	−6.2%
1926	2,152	−19.3%

Year	Pop.	±%
1936	2,106	−2.1%
1946	1,968	−6.6%
1951	1,765	−10.3%
1956	1,678	−4.9%
1961	1,648	−1.8%
1966	1,612	−2.2%
1971	1,496	−7.2%
1979	1,377	−8.0%
1981	1,368	−0.7%

Year	Pop.	±%
1986	1,339	−2.1%
1991	1,322	−1.3%
1996	1,303	−1.4%
2002	1,280	−1.8%
2006	1,225	−4.3%
2011	1,251	+2.1%
2016	1,226	−2.0%
2022	1,347	+9.9%

Source: Central Statistics Office. "CNA17: Population by Off Shore Island, Sex and Year". CSO.ie.

== Flora and fauna ==
The islands support arctic, Mediterranean and alpine plants side-by-side, due to the unusual environment. Like the Burren, the Aran islands are renowned for their remarkable assemblage of plants and animals.

The grikes (crevices) provide moist shelter, thus supporting a wide range of plants including dwarf shrubs. Where the surface of the pavement is shattered into gravel, many of the hardier Arctic or alpine plants can be found, but when the limestone pavement is covered by a thin layer of soil, patches of grass are seen, interspersed with plants such as gentian and orchids.

Notable insects present include butterflies—pearl-bordered fritillary Boloria euphrosyne, brown hairstreak Thecla betulae, marsh fritillary Euphydryas aurinia, and wood white Leptidea sinapis; moths—the burren green Calamia tridens, Irish annulet Odontognophos dumetata, and transparent burnet Zygaena purpuralis; and the hoverfly Doros profuges.

== Traditional life and Irish language ==
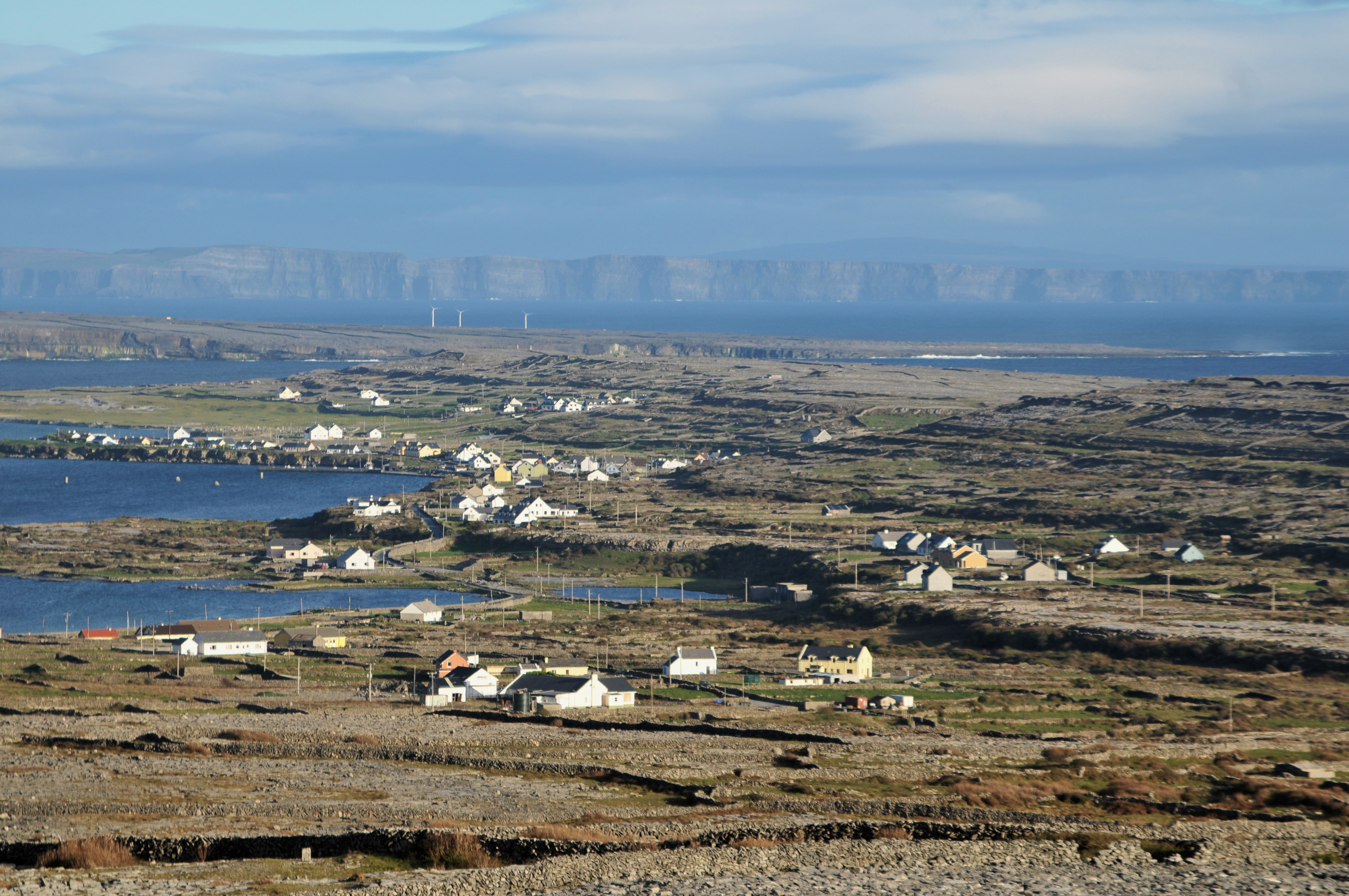
A view over Inishmore, from Dún Eochla, with Inishmaan and the Cliffs of Moher in the background

On the cliff tops, ancient forts such as Dún Aonghasa (Dún Aengus) on Inishmore and Dún Chonchúir (Fort of Conchobar) on Inishmaan are some of the oldest archaeological remains in Ireland. A lacework of ancient stone walls across all three islands (1,600 km or 1,000 mi in all) encloses networks of small fields to contain local livestock. Also found are early clocháns (dry-stone beehive huts from the early-Christian period). Enda of Aran founded the first true Irish monastery near Killeany (Cill Éinne or Church of Enda). In time, a dozen monasteries were on Inishmore alone. Many Irish saints had some connection with Aran: St. Brendan was blessed for his voyage there; Jarlath of Tuam, Finnian of Clonard, and St. Columba called it the "Sun of the West". In total, 38 national monuments are on the Aran Islands.

The islands were first populated in larger numbers, probably at the time of the Cromwellian conquest of Ireland in the mid-17th century, when the Catholic population of Ireland had the choice of going "to hell or to Connacht". Many fled to the numerous islands off the west coast, where they adapted to the raw climatic conditions, developing a survival system of total self-sufficiency. Their methods included mixing layers of sand and seaweed on top of rocks to create fertile soil, a technique used to grow potatoes and other vegetables. The same seaweed method also provided grazing grass within stone-wall enclosures for cattle and sheep which in turn provided leather, wool, and yarn to make hide shoes, handwoven trousers, skirts and jackets, hand-knitted jumpers, shawls, and caps. The islanders also constructed unique boats called currachs for fishing, building their thatched cottages from the materials available, or trading with the mainland.

The Aran Islands are a Gaeltacht or Irish-speaking area which gives official status to the language as the medium of all official services, including education. An unusually high rate of Irish-language monolingualism was found among senior inhabitants until the end of the 20th century, in large part because of the isolating nature of the traditional trades practised and the natural isolation of the islands in general from mainland Ireland over the course of the islands' history. Young islanders can take their school-leaving examinations, the Leaving Certificate, at the age of 18, then most leave for third-level education. Many blame the decline of Irish-speaking among young members of the island community on English-language television, available since the 1960s; furthermore, many younger islanders leave for the mainland when they come of age.

== Transport ==
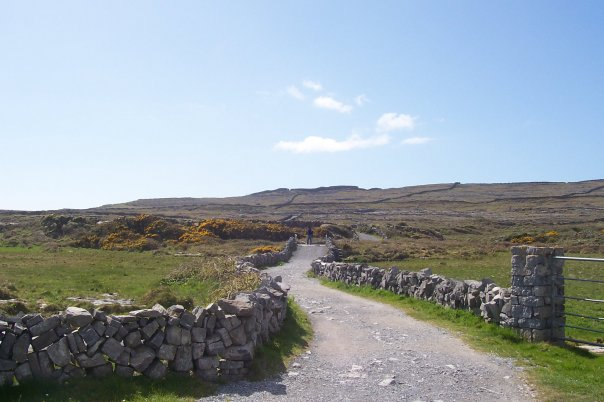
Road in Inishmore

Year-round ferry passenger services exist. Aran Island Ferries operate a year-round service from Rossaveal in County Galway, connected by a bus service from Galway city. A heavy-cargo service operates several times a week from Galway Harbour, and is operated by Lasta Mara.

Aer Arann Islands operates an air service from Inverin to Inishmore Airport, which has a connecting bus from Galway city. The airline announced that it would cease all flights in December 2018, but an agreement was reached to continue the service until 30 September 2019.

Ferries are also available to the Aran Islands from Doolin in County Clare (seasonal 1 April – 31 October).

A road network exists on each of the islands, and a speed limit of 50 km/h (31 mph) applies. Cars on the islands are exempt from road-worthiness testing. Most visitors to the island hire bikes and an increasing number hire ebikes, as they are the most convenient way to see the islands.

== Tourism ==
=== Visitors and attractions ===
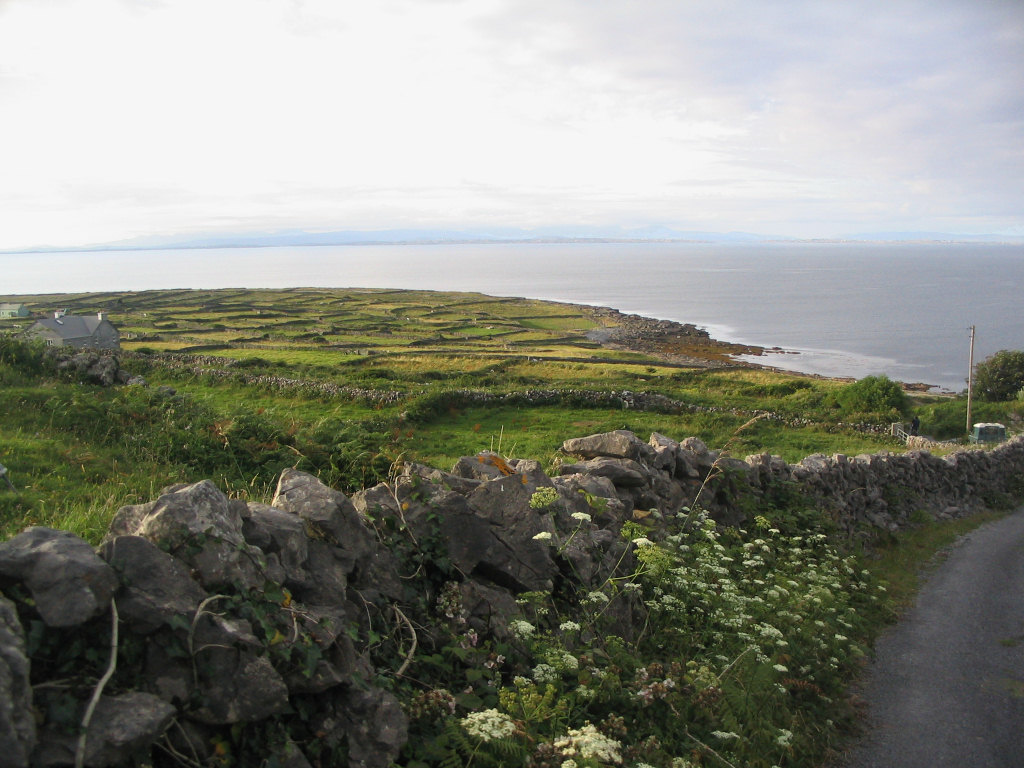
Inishmore

Visitors come in large numbers, particularly in the summer. Several Bronze Age and Iron Age forts and attractions are on the islands:

- Dun Aengus (Dún Aonghasa, Aran Islands Dialect: dūn aŋgəs) is a Bronze Age and Iron Age fort on the edge of a 100 metres (330 ft) cliff overlooking the Atlantic Ocean on Inishmore. It consists of a series of concentric circular walls. The innermost—the citadel—encloses an area approximately 50 metres (160 feet) in diameter with 4-metre (13-foot) thick walls of stone.
- Black Fort (Dún Dúchathair)
- O'Brien's Castle on Inisheer was built in the 14th century. The castle was taken from the O'Briens by the O'Flaherty clan of Connemara in 1582.
- Teampall Bheanáin is considered the smallest church in the world, and is notable for its orientation: north–south instead of east–west.
- Teampall an Cheathrair Álainn has a holy well, which inspired J. M. Synge's play The Well of the Saints.

== Arts ==
=== Local artists ===
One of the major figures of the Irish Renaissance, Liam O'Flaherty, was born in Gort na gCapall, Inishmore, on 28 August 1896. Máirtín Ó Díreáin, one of the most eminent poets in the Irish language, was also from Inishmore. Since 2000, Áras Éanna Arts Centre, Inisheer, has been welcoming artists in residence, both local and international, to stay and work on the inspirational Aran Islands for periods of one month. Clíodhna Lyons, born on the islands, is an Irish cartoonist, animator, and printmaker, who has created several comics and 'zines and is now a director for Brown Bag Films.

=== Visiting artists ===
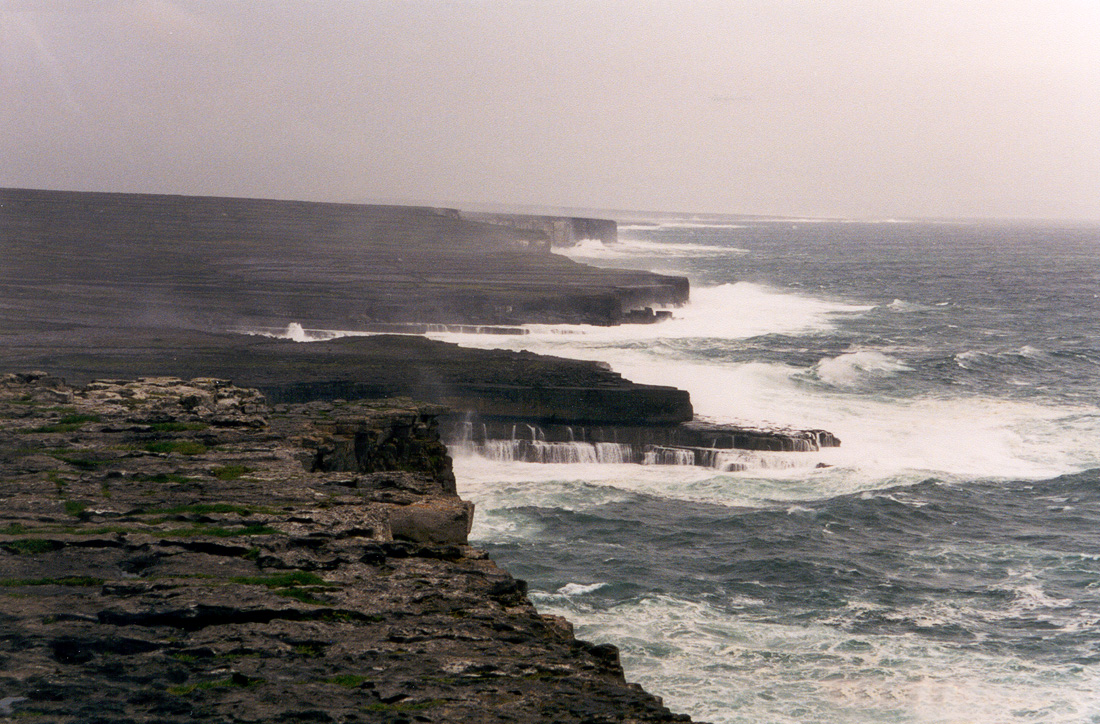
View of Inishmore coastline.

The islands have historically attracted a number of artists. For example, starting in 1908, Harry Clarke spent a number of weeks each summer for six years on Inisheer, accompanied by friends and his future wife, Margaret Clarke (artist). Sketches by and of Clarke exist from these trips, regarded as formative in his upbringing, as they marked the first occasions in which convalescing off the mainland of Ireland was necessary for the artist.

The cultural and physical history of the islands has made them the object of visits by a variety of writers. For example, Lady Gregory came to Aran in the late 19th century to learn Irish. At the start of the 20th century and throughout his life, Seán Keating spent time painting on the islands every year. Elizabeth Rivers also moved from London and lived in Aran, where she created two books of art and was herself visited by artists such as Basil Rakoczi.

A further, related, kind of visitor was those who attempted to collect and catalogue the stories and folklore of the island, treating it as a kind of societal "time capsule" of an earlier stage of Irish culture. Visits of this kind include that captured in Robert J. Flaherty's 1934 classic documentary Man of Aran. The film's depiction of man's courage and repudiation of the intellect appealed to Germany's Nazi party, who noticed it during the Berlin Festival in 1935.

John Millington Synge's The Aran Islands is a work that straddles these first two modes, being both a personal account and also an attempt at preserving information about the pre- (or il-) literate Aran culture in literary form. The motivations of these visitors are exemplified by W. B. Yeats' advice to Synge: "Go to the Aran Islands, and find a life that has never been expressed in literature."

In the second half of the 20th century, until perhaps the early 1970s, a third kind of visitor came to the islands. They came not necessarily because of the uniquely "Irish" nature of the island community, but simply because the accidents of geography and history conspired to produce a society that some found intriguing or even beguiling, and they wished to participate in it directly. At no time was there a single "Aran" culture; any description is necessarily incomplete and can be said to apply completely only to "parts" of the island at certain points in time. Visitors who came and stayed, though, were mainly attracted to aspects of Aran culture such as its reliance on local oral tradition for entertainment and news, isolation, reliance on subsistence or near-subsistence, farming and fishing.

For these reasons, the Aran Islands were "decoupled" from cultural developments that were at the same time radically changing other parts of Ireland and Western Europe. Though visitors of this third kind understood that the culture they encountered was intimately connected to that of Ireland, they were not particularly inclined to interpret their experiences as those of "Irishness". Instead, they looked directly towards ways in which their time on the islands put them in touch with more general truths about life and human relations, and they often took pains to live "as an islander", eschewing help from friends and family at home. Indeed, because of the difficult conditions they found—dangerous weather, scarce food—they sometimes had little time to investigate the culture in the more detached manner of earlier visitors. Their writings are often of a more personal nature, being concerned with understanding the author's self as much as the culture around him.

This third mode of being in Aran died out in the late 1970s due in part to the increased tourist traffic and in part to technological improvements made to the island, that relegated the above aspects to history. A literary product of this third kind of visitor is An Aran Keening, by Andrew McNeillie, who spent a year on Aran in 1968. Another, Pádraig Ó Síocháin, a Dublin author and lawyer, learning to speak Irish to the fluency of an islander, became inextricably linked to the Aran handknitters and their Aran sweaters, extensively promoting their popularity and sale around the world for nearly forty years.

A fourth kind of visitor to the islands, still evident today, comes for spiritual reasons often connected to an appreciation for Celtic Christianity or more modern New Age beliefs, the former of which finds sites and landscapes of importance on the islands.

Finally, many thousands of visitors come for broadly touristic reasons, to see the ruins, hear Irish spoken (and Irish music played) in the few pubs on the island, and to experience the geology of cliffs. Some of these visitors create "travelogues" of note. Examples include Tim Robinson's Stones of Aran: Pilgrimage (1986) and Stones of Aran: Labyrinth (1995), and his accompanying detailed map of the islands.

== Island crafts ==
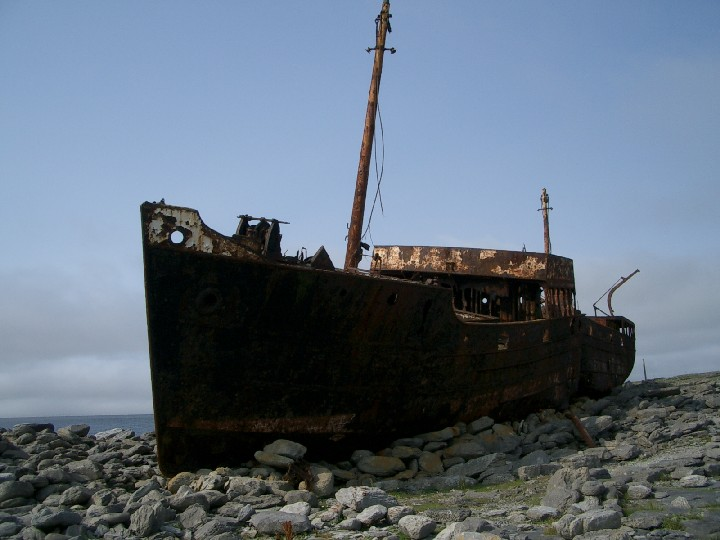
The wreck of the Plassey sits on the shore of Inisheer. Fishing is a small but important part of the area's economy.

=== Aran Island jumper ===
The islands are the home of the Aran jumper (a woollen garment), which gained worldwide appeal during the 20th century. Many of the jumpers sold in the islands are made elsewhere in Ireland.

=== Aran currach ===
The (modern) Aran version of the lightweight boat called the currach (Aran Islands Dialect: kørəx, korəx) is made from canvas stretched over a sparse skeleton of thin laths, then covered in tar. It is designed to withstand the very rough seas that are typical of islands that face the open Atlantic. Indeed, the Aran fishermen are said to not learn to swim, since they would certainly not survive any sea that swamped a currach, so it would be better to drown quickly. Despite the undoubted strength of these boats, they are very vulnerable to puncture.

== Sport ==
Some of the limestone sea cliffs have attracted interest from rock-climbers. GAA sports such as Gaelic football, hurling, and Irish handball are the islands' main sports.

== In popular culture ==
- John Millington Synge wrote a book-length journal, The Aran Islands, completed in 1901 and published in 1907.
- The Aran Islands are mentioned in James Joyce's short story "The Dead" (1914) as a place where native Irish is spoken.
- The 1934 ethnofiction documentary film Man of Aran
- Gilbert Bécaud's two-act L'Opéra d'Aran (1962) features a plot taking place on the Aran Islands.
- Seamus Heaney's first book of poems, Death of a Naturalist (1966), contains a poem entitled "Lovers on Aran".
- The Aran Islands featured in the comedy television series Father Ted from 1995 to 1998, set on the fictional Craggy Island, with real local sights such as the shipwreck of the steam trawler MV Plassy in the opening sequence. The island of Inishmore hosted a Friends of Ted festival in 2007.
- The 1996 play The Cripple of Inishmaan by Martin McDonagh is set on the Aran Islands. The play is the first in the Aran Islands Trilogy, followed in 2001 by The Lieutenant of Inishmore, and the unpublished The Banshees of Inisheer.
- The 1997 romantic comedy film The MatchMaker starring Janeane Garofalo is partially set on the Aran Islands.
- The 2000 song "El pozo de Aran" by Galician Celtic musician Carlos Núñez, with lead vocals by Portuguese singer Anabela, is about a mother's pilgrimage to a holy well in the islands to heal her sickly child.
- The 2010 film Leap Year was partially filmed on Inishmore.
- The 2020 novella "The fourth island" by Sarah Tolmie is set on the fictional Aran island of Inis Caillte, to where lost souls are swept over.
- The 2022 film The Banshees of Inisherin was partially filmed on Inishmore.
- The songs from the album Man of Aran by the group Sea Power all relate to the Aran Islands.
- In the pilot episode of Talking Tom and Friends, Talking Hank mentions a show set on the Aran Islands.

== Notable people ==
- Mary O'Hara resides on one of the Aran Islands.

== See also ==
- List of tourist attractions in Ireland
- Inis Beag: a fictional name for Inisheer
- Tim Robinson (cartographer)
