= Inishmore =

Island off the west coast of Ireland

Native name: Árainn
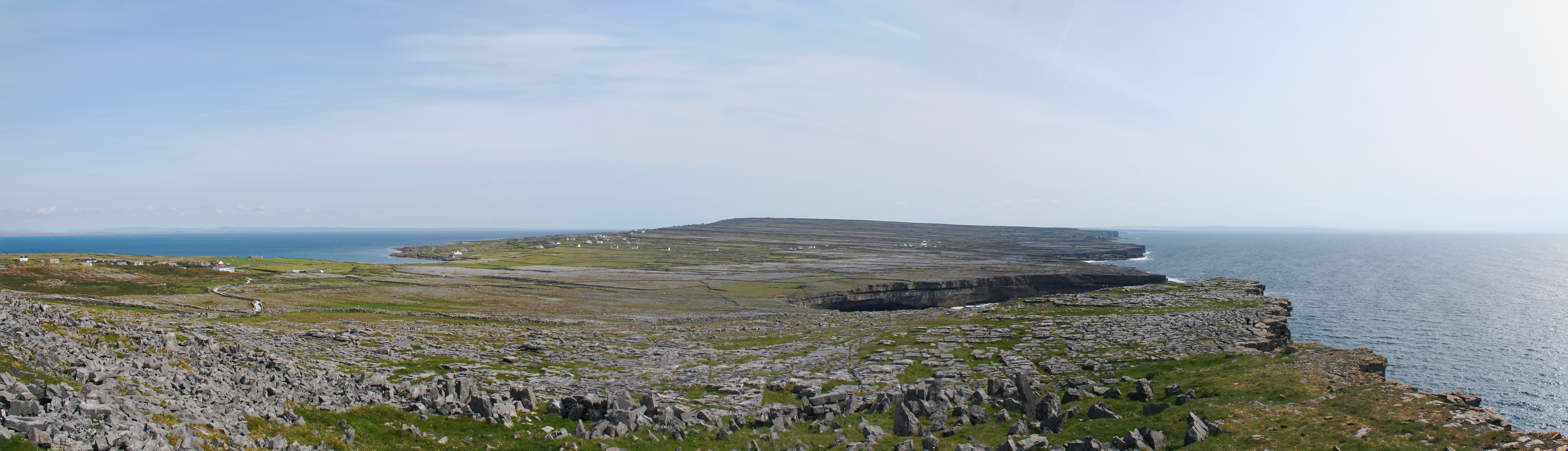
- The karst landscape on Inishmore from Dún Aonghasa

- Location within island of Ireland

Geography
- Location: Atlantic Ocean
- Coordinates: 53°07′25″N 9°43′39″W
- Area: 7,636 acres (3,090 ha)
- Length: 14 km (8.7 mi)
- Width: 3.8 km (2.36 mi)
- Highest elevation: 123 m (404 ft)
- Highest point: An Droim Rua

Administration
- Ireland
- Province: Connacht
- County: Galway

Demographics
- Population: 820 (2022)
- Pop. density: 24.7/km^{2} (64/sq mi)

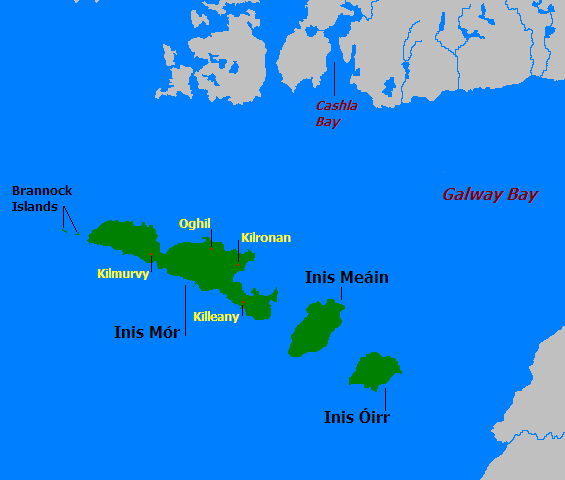
Inis Mór is the largest of the Aran Islands

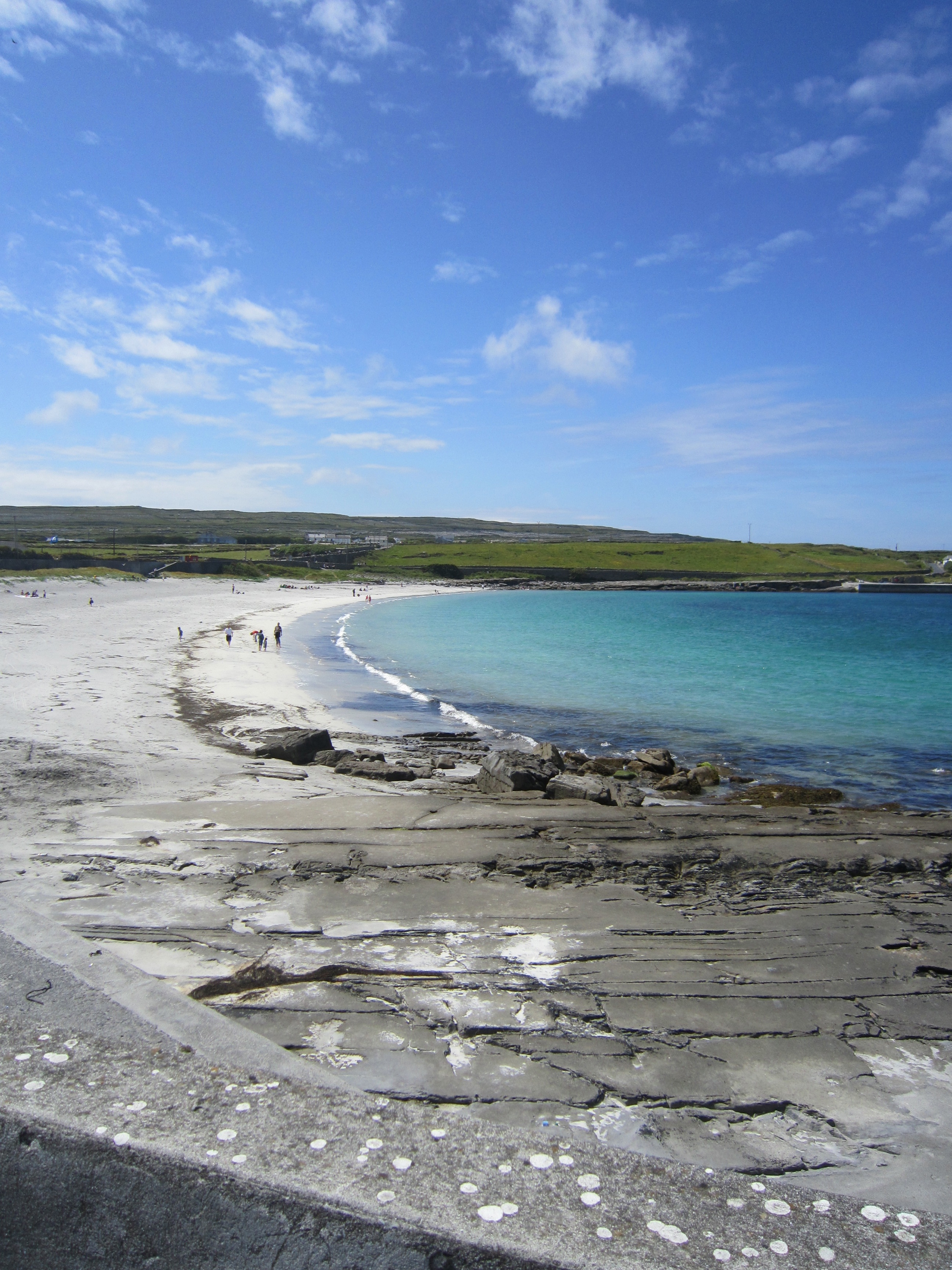
Beach on Inis Mór

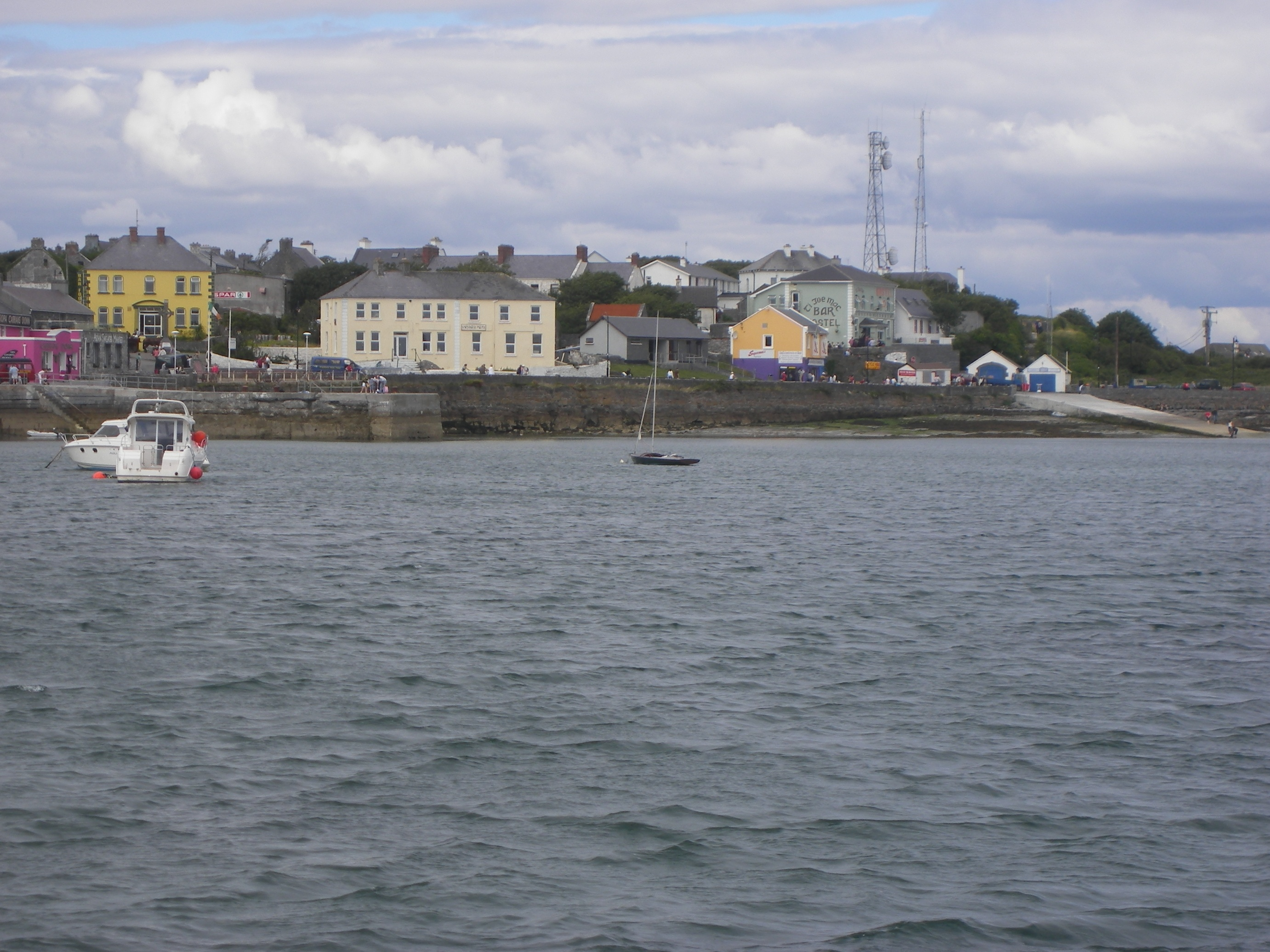
Cill Rónáin

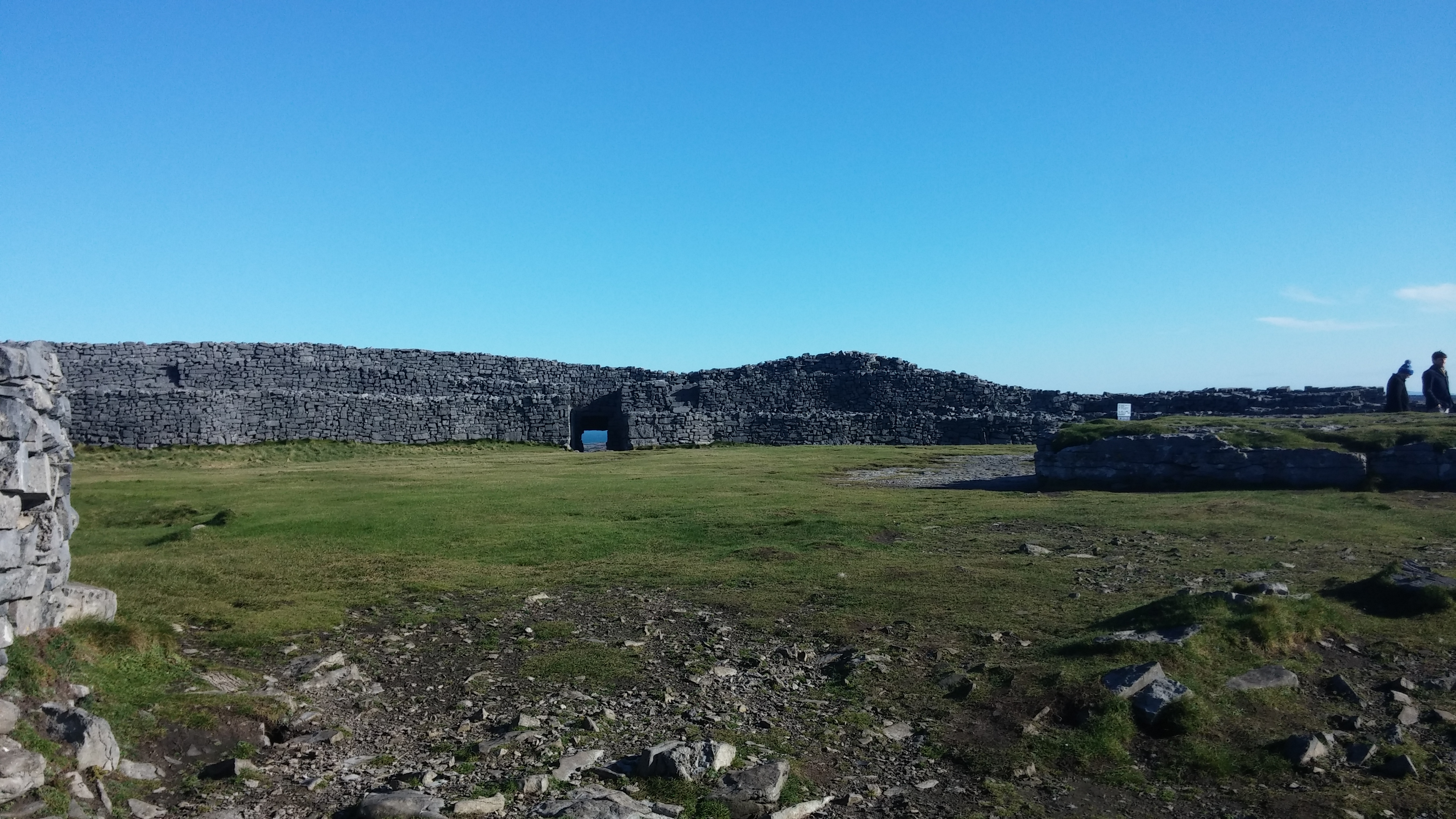
Photograph from within Dún Aonghusa on Inis Mór in Galway Bay, Ireland, a prehistoric coastal hill fort

Inishmore (Irish: Árainn [ˈaːɾˠən̠ʲ], Árainn Mhór [ˈaːɾˠən̠ʲ woːɾ] or Inis Mór [ˈɪnʲɪʃ mˠoːɾ]) is the largest of the Aran Islands in Galway Bay, off the west coast of Ireland. With an area of 31 km^{2} (12 sq mi) and a population of 820 (as of 2016), it is the second-largest island off the Irish coast (after Achill) and most populous of the Aran Islands.

The island is in the Irish-speaking Gaeltacht and has a strong Irish culture. Much of the island is karst landscape and it has a wealth of ancient and medieval sites including Dún Aonghasa, described as "the most magnificent barbaric monument in Europe" by George Petrie. The island is a civil parish of the same name.

== Name ==
Before the 20th century, the island was usually called Árainn or Árainn Mhór, which is thought to mean 'kidney-shaped' or 'ridge'. It was anglicized as Aran, Aran More, or Great Aran. This has caused some confusion with Arranmore, County Donegal, which has the same Irish name. The name "Inishmore" was "apparently concocted by the Ordnance Survey for its map of 1839 as an Anglicization of Inis Mór ('big island'), as there is no evidence of its use before then.

Because the island is in the Gaeltacht, Árainn is the only legal placename in Irish or English as declared in the Official Languages Act 2003.

== History ==
During the Cromwellian conquest of Ireland, Inishmore was, similarly to Inishbofin, used by the New Model Army as a prison camp for Roman Catholic priests who were arrested while continuing their priestly ministry in nonviolent resistance to the Commonwealth of England's 1653 decree of banishment. The last priests held in both islands were finally released following the Stuart Restoration in 1662.

== Geology and geography ==
The island is an extension of the Burren. The terrain of the island is composed of limestone pavements with crisscrossing cracks known as "grikes", leaving isolated rocks called "clints". The limestones date from the Visean stage of the Carboniferous period, formed as sediments in a shallow tropical sea approximately 330-350 million years ago, and compressed into horizontal strata with fossil corals, crinoids, and sea urchins.

The effects of the last glacial period (the Midlandian) are evident, with the island overrun by ice. The result is that Inis Mór and the other islands are among the finer examples of Glacio-Karst landscape in the world. The impact of earlier karstification (solutional erosion) has been eliminated by the last glacial period. So any Karstification now seen dates from approximately 10,000 years ago and the island Karst is thus recent.

Solutional processes have widened and deepened the grikes of the limestone pavement. Pre-existing lines of weakness in the rock (vertical joints) contribute to the formation of extensive fissures separated by clints (flat pavement like slabs). The rock karstification facilitates the formation of subterranean drainage.

=== Towns and villages ===
- Cill Rónáin (Kilronan)
- Eochaill (Oghill)
- Mainistir (Manister)
- Cill Mhuirbhigh (Kilmurvy)
- Iarairne (Eararna)
- Cill Éinne (Killeany)
- Gort na gCapall
- Fearann an Choirce (Oatquarter)
- Corrúch
- Creig an Chéirín
- Bungabhla
- Baile na Creige
- Sruthán
- Eoghanacht (Onaght)

== Flora and fauna ==
The island supports arctic, Mediterranean and alpine plants side by side, due to the unusual environment. Like the Burren, the Aran islands are known for their unusual assemblage of plants and animals. The grikes (crevices) provide moist shelter, thus supporting a wide range of plants including dwarf shrubs. Where the surface of the pavement is shattered into gravel, many of the hardier Arctic or alpine plants can be found.

But when the limestone pavement is covered by a thin layer of soil, patches of grass are seen, interspersed with plants like the gentian and orchids. Insects present include butterflies the pearl-bordered fritillary (Boloria euphrosyne), brown hairstreak (Thecla betulae), marsh fritillary (Euphydryas aurinia) and wood white (Leptidea sinapis); moths, the burren green (Calamia tridens), Irish annulet (Gnophos dumetata) and transparent burnet (Zygaena purpuralis); and the hoverfly Doros profuges.

== Tourism ==
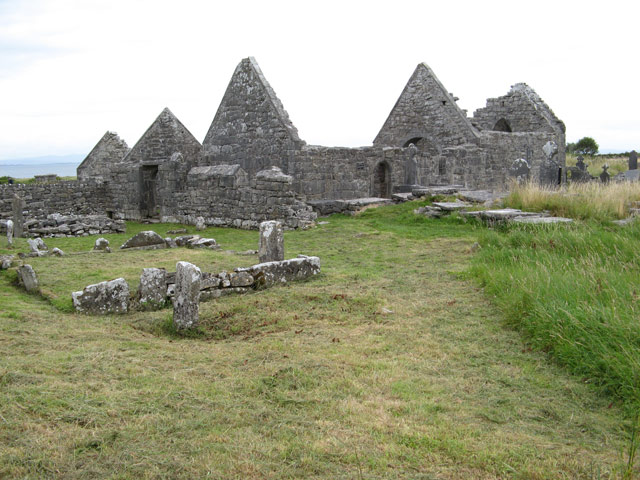
Na Seacht dTeampaill (The Seven Churches), Inis Mór

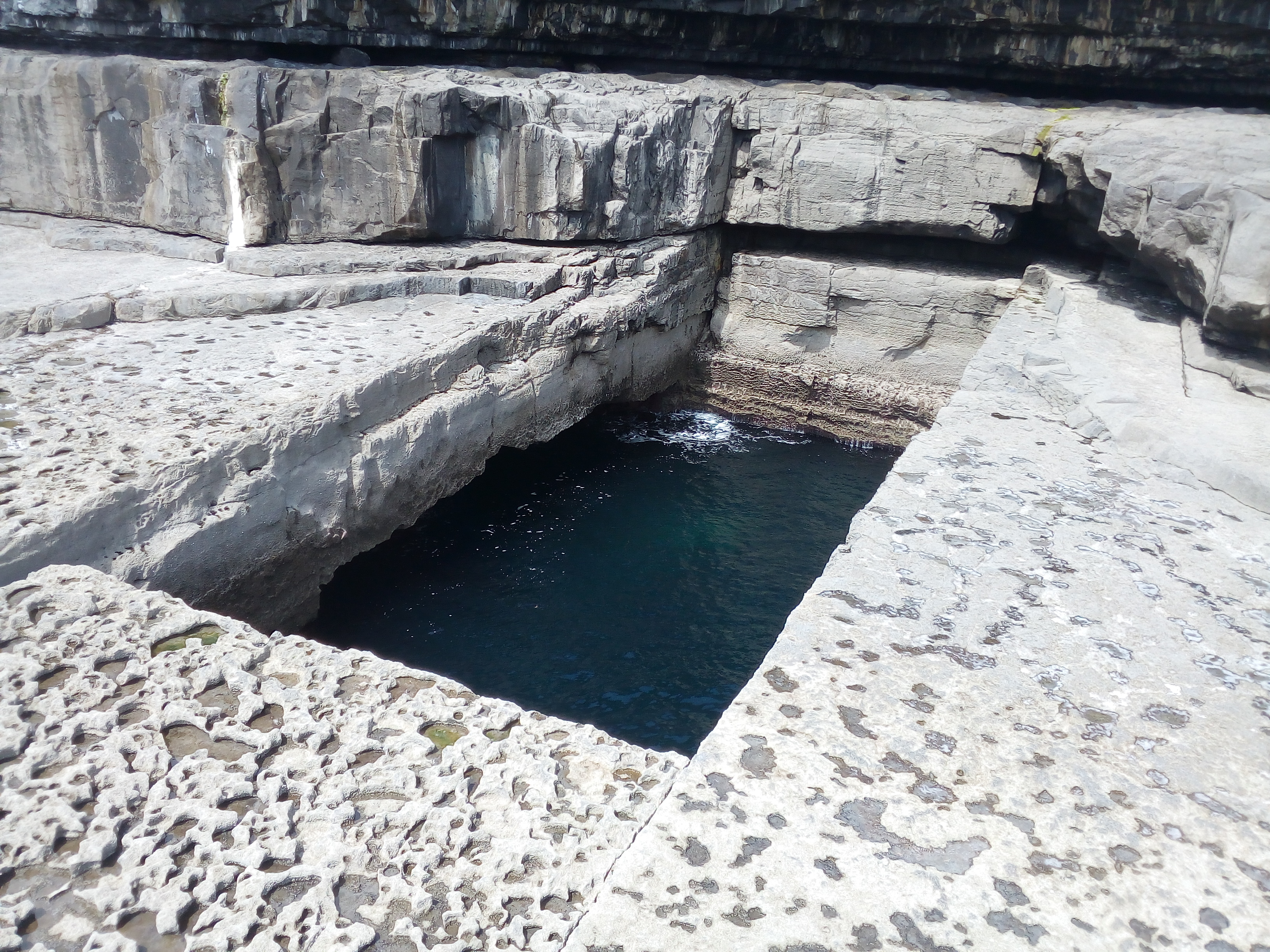
Poll na bPéist (53.121613°N 9.754580°W)

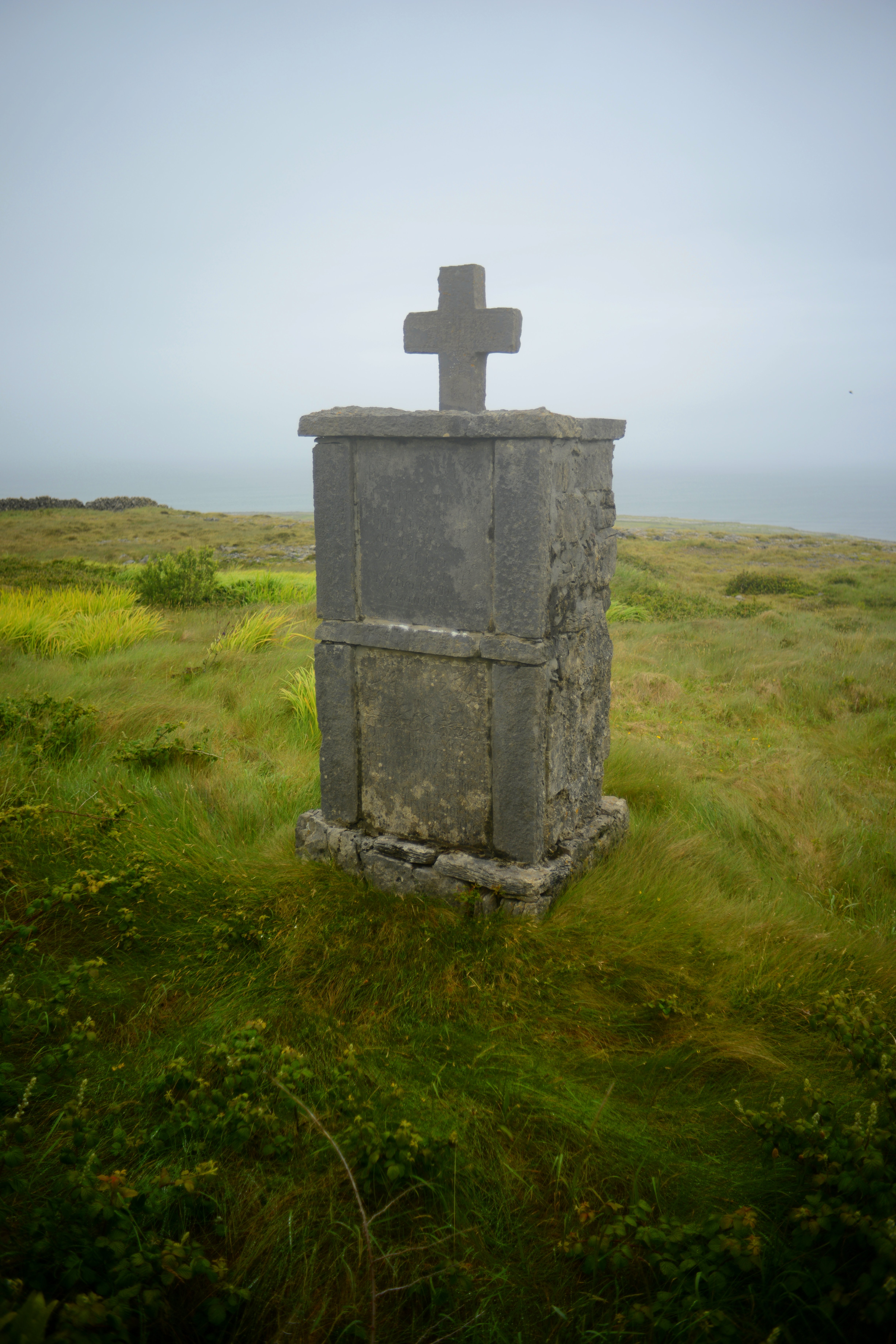
A gravestone

Inis Mór today is a major tourist destination, with bed and breakfast accommodation scattered across the island. Private minibuses, ebikes, and horse-drawn carriages, locally called pony traps, are the main methods of getting about for the numerous tourists who visit in the summer.

There is a small museum illustrating the history of Dún Aonghasa and its possible functions, while the Aran Sweater Market is a focal point for visitors who can trace the culture and history associated with the Aran sweater through the on-site museum. Near the lighthouse are a Neolithic tomb and a small heritage park at Dún Eochla. Dun Eochla is an almost circular fort with an inner wall that gives access to a walkway on its top. The heritage park features examples of a traditional thatched cottage and poteen distillery. The Tempull Breccain (Church of Brecan), commonly called the Seven Churches of Aran, is a complex of churches and other buildings dedicated to the 5th-century Saint Brecan, once a popular destination for pilgrims. In the centre of the island, at its highest point, is the Inishmore Lighthouse. It was decommissioned in 1857 and replaced by the lights at Eeragh and Inisheer.

The island plays host to Ted Fest each year. First celebrated in 2007, it is a celebration of the sitcom Father Ted. Festival-goers dress as their favourite characters, watch their favourite episodes and take part in various Ted-related events and competitions.

== Sport ==
Some of the limestone sea cliffs have attracted interest from rock climbers.

Diving is possible, with a particularly popular location being Poll na bPéist (English: The Wormhole or Serpent's Lair), a large pool on the island's southern coast, remarkably close in form to a true rectangle for such a completely natural formation. (It is so named because in local legend it was said to be the home of a dangerous sea serpent.) Poll na bPéist has at times hosted events of the Red Bull Cliff Diving World Series.

Poll na bPéist connects to the sea via subsurface channels including a cavern, so the pool is also a scuba diving spot

== Transport ==
The island is serviced by Aran Ferries ferry from Rossaveal and Doolin. These are passenger-only ferries; cars and heavy goods are transported on unscheduled services.

Aer Arann Islands runs daily scheduled flights from Inis Mór Aerodrome to Connemara Airport using Britten Norman Islander aircraft.

== In popular culture ==
The island features heavily in Martin McDonagh's play The Lieutenant of Inishmore. McDonagh also used Inishmore as a location for his film The Banshees of Inisherin.

Inis Mór was used as a recording location for the 1997 film The Matchmaker and the 2010 film Leap Year.

The first story in These Precious Hours by Michael Corrigan has a scene set on Inis Mór.

The island appeared on the premiere episode of The Amazing Race 12 with teams needing to find Teampall Bheanáin after they arrived.

The music video for Dermot Kennedy's "For Island Fires and Family" (released 10 January 2019) was filmed entirely on Inis Mór.

Inishmore is the name of the tenth album by the New York heavy metal forefathers Riot (now called Riot V) and loosely based on tales of Irish famine and emigration, employing many Celtic/Irish sounding passages, as well as an instrumental cover of the Irish song Danny Boy.

== Notable inhabitants ==
- Ceannanach, early Irish missionary, fl. c. 490–500?
- Saint Fanchea, abbess of Killeaney, fl. 500
- Enda of Aran, early Christian missionary, died c. 530
- Mahon mac Turlough Mantach Ó Briain, Chief of Inis Mór, died 1565
- Murrough mac Toirdelbach Ó Briain, Chief of Inis Mór, fl. 1575–1588
- Murrough na dTuadh Ó Flaithbheartaigh, Lord of Iar Connacht, fl. 1569–1593
- Pat Mullen, actor and writer, assistant director Man of Aran, 1893-1972
- Bridget Dirrane, centenarian, nurse, memoirist, 1894-2003
- Liam O'Flaherty, bilingual playwright, novelist and short story writer, 28 August 1896 – 7 September 1984
- Elizabeth Rivers, artist and author, 1903-1964
- Máirtín Ó Direáin, Irish language poet and highly important figure in Modern literature in Irish, 1910–1988
- Breandán Ó hEithir, writer and broadcaster, 1930–1990
- Tim Robinson, author, 1935–2020
- Maura Derrane, RTÉ television presenter, born 1970
- Barbara Feeney (née Curran), mother of director John Ford (né John Feeney) was born in the town of Kilronan

== Aran in the Irish annals ==
From the Annals of Inisfallen (AI):

- 530 – "Enda of Aran died."
- 654 – "St Nem Moccu Birn, successor of Enne, of Ara, died on the 14th of June."
- 751 – "Repose of Colmán mac Comán, in Ára."
- 755 – "Gaimdibhla, Abbot of Aran, died."
- 916 – "Egnech, successor of Enda of Ara, bishop and anchorite, died."
- 1110 – "Flann Ua Aedha, successor of Énna of Ára, died."
- 1114 – "Maelcoluim Ua Cormacain, successor of Ende of Ara, died."
- "AI1015.8 The foreigners of the Isles, viz. with the complement of seven ships, raided the Islands, and they plundered Ara, Inse Mod, and Inis Aingin(?), and carried off one hundred and fifty [captives] as booty."
- "AI1016.6 The slaughter of Ára, in which Ua Lochlainn, royal heir of Corcu Modruad, was killed in Port Ciaráin in Ára. It was the Conmaicne who slew him."
- "AI1019.4 A great pestilence, i.e. a colic, in Ára in the above year, and many people died there."
- 1167 – Gillagori Ua Dubhacan, "successor of Einde of Ara, died."

== Demographics ==
The table below reports data on Inis Mór's population taken from Discover the Islands of Ireland (Alex Ritsema, Collins Press, 1999) and the census of Ireland.

Historical population

Year	Pop.	±%
1841	2,592	—
1851	2,312	−10.8%
1861	2,281	−1.3%
1871	2,110	−7.5%
1881	2,178	+3.2%
1891	1,979	−9.1%
1901	1,941	−1.9%
1911	1,768	−8.9%
1926	1,363	−22.9%

Year	Pop.	±%
1936	1,286	−5.6%
1946	1,133	−11.9%
1951	1,016	−10.3%
1956	941	−7.4%
1961	933	−0.9%
1966	925	−0.9%
1971	864	−6.6%
1979	883	+2.2%
1981	891	+0.9%

Year	Pop.	±%
1986	848	−4.8%
1991	836	−1.4%
1996	838	+0.2%
2002	831	−0.8%
2006	824	−0.8%
2011	845	+2.5%
2016	762	−9.8%
2022	820	+7.6%

Source: Central Statistics Office. "CNA17: Population by Off Shore Island, Sex and Year". CSO.ie. 2016 population: "CSO Statbank E2021".

== Annalistic references ==
AI=Annals of Inisfallen. (AF)M=Annals of the Four Masters.

- AI1016.6 "The slaughter of Ára, in which Ua Lochlainn, royal heir of Corcu Modruad, was killed in Port Ciaráin in Ára. It was the Conmaicne who slew him. Death of Muiredach son of Cadla, king of Conmaicne Mara."
- AI1019.4 "A great pestilence, i.e. a colic, in Ára in the above year, and many people died there."
- M1186 "Conchubhar Ua Flaithbertaigh was killed by Ruaidhri Ua Flaithbertaigh, by his own brother, in Ara."
- M1560.8 "Mahon, the son of Turlough, son of Teige, son of Donough, son of Donnell, son of Turlough Meith O'Brien, went into Desmond with the crew of a ship and boat, from the island of Aran. He took prisoners in the southern country, but some assert that the taking of them was of no advantage, and that they only accompanied him through friendship. On his return with his spoils, the wind became rough, and the sky angry; and the ship and boat were separated from each other; and when the ship was making for Aran in the beginning of the night, the sail was swept away from the hands of the men and warriors, and torn to rags off the ropes and tackles, and wafted into the regions of the firmament; and the ship afterwards struck upon a rock, which is at the mouth of Cuan-an-fhir-mhoir, in West Connaught, where she was lost, with her crew, except Mahon and three others. Upwards of one hundred were drowned in that harbour, among whom was Tuathal O'Malley, the best pilot of a fleet of long ships in his time."
- M1565.3 "Mahon, the son of Turlough Mantagh, son of Donough, son of Donnell, son of Turlough Meith, was treacherously slain in his own town of Aircin, in Aran, by his own associates and relations. When the chief men of Galway heard of this, they set out to revenge this misdeed upon the treacherous perpetrators, so that they compelled them to fly from their houses; and they the fugitives went into a boat, and put to sea; and where they landed was in the harbour of Ross, in West Corca-Bhaiscinn. Donnell, the son of Conor O'Brien, having heard of this, he hastened to meet them with all the speed that he could exert; and he made prisoners of the greater number of them, and carried them in close fetters to Magh Glae, in the upper part of Corcomroe, in order that their sorrow and anguish might be the greater for being in view of the place where they had perpetrated the crime; he hanged some of them, and burned others, according as their evil practices deserved."
