= History of Christianity in Ireland =

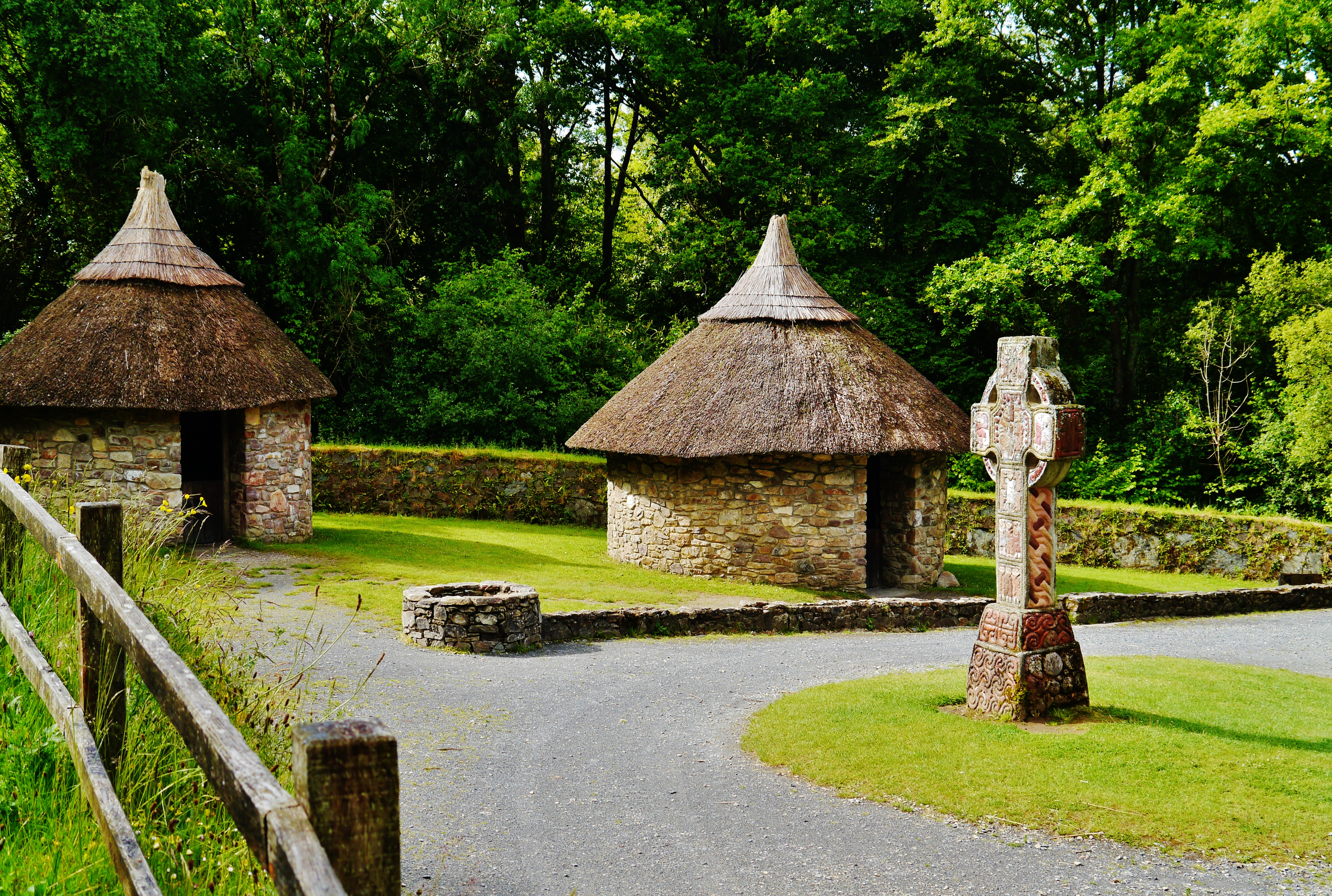
Early Christian monastery at the Irish National Heritage Park

Christianity arrived in Ireland sometime before the 5th century, presumably in interactions with Roman Britain. When the British gained full control of Ireland by means of a series of military campaigns in the period 1534–1691, the island was progressively colonised by English and Scottish Protestant settlers. Most of the Irish remained Roman Catholic.

Roman Catholicism is still the largest religious denomination, representing over 69% of the population of the island and about 69% of the population of the Republic of Ireland in the 2022 census.

== Introduction of Christianity ==
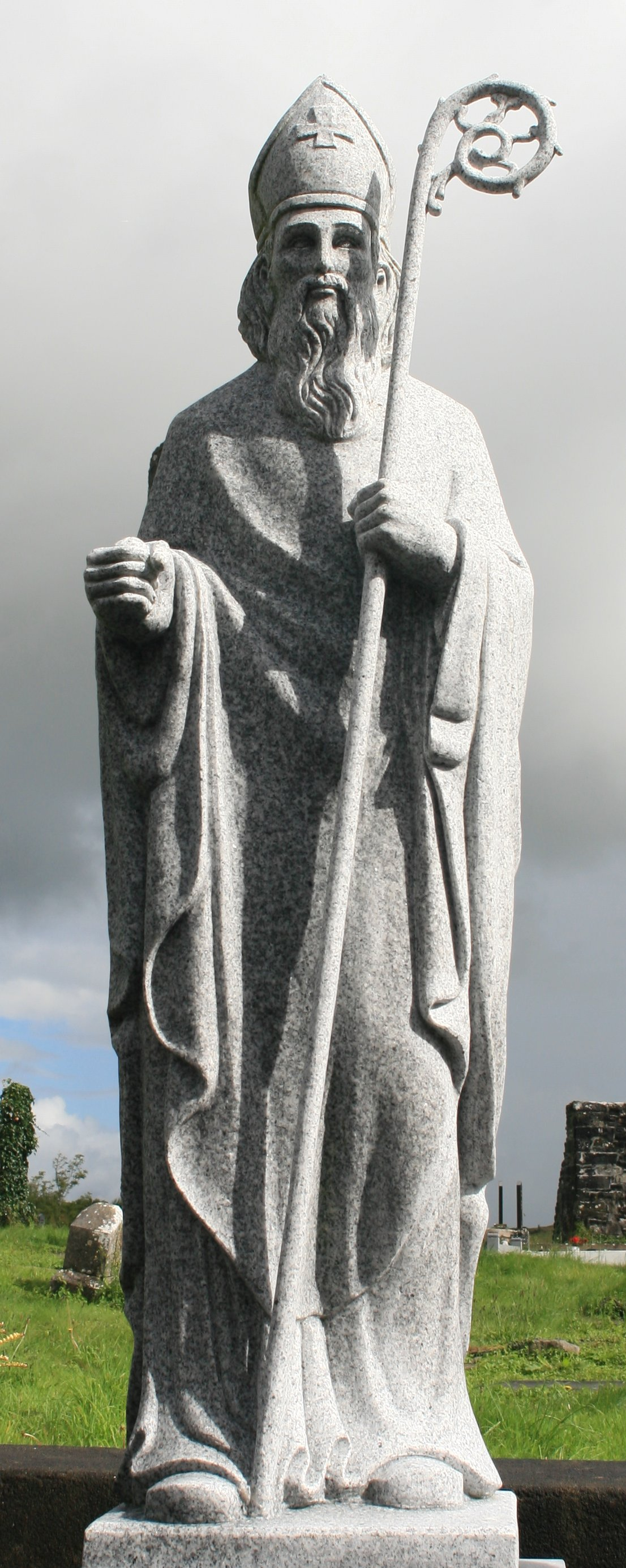
Statue of Saint Patrick in Aughagower, County Mayo

The introduction of Christianity to Ireland dates to sometime before the 5th century, presumably in interactions with Roman Britain, though evidence also exists of early Christian influences stemming from the Coptic Orthodox Church in Egypt. Christian worship had reached pagan Ireland around AD 400. It is often claimed that Saint Patrick brought the faith to Ireland c. 432, but it was already present on the island before Patrick's mission.

Monasteries were built for monks who wanted permanent communion with God. The lengths to which some monks went for tranquillity are evident from the monastery of Skellig Michael. One notable Irish monk and missionary, Bishop Aidan (died 651), is credited with spreading Christianity among the Picts and Northumbrians.

Scholars have long regarded the term "Celtic Church" as inappropriate for describing Christianity among Celtic-speaking peoples, since this would imply a notion of unity, or a self-identifying entity, that did not exist. As Patrick Wormald explained, "One of the common misconceptions is that there was a 'Roman Church' to which the 'Celtic' was nationally opposed." Celtic-speaking areas were part of Latin Christendom as a whole, wherein a significant degree of liturgical and structural variation existed, along with a collective veneration of the Bishop of Rome that was no less intense in Britain and Ireland. Some scholars have chosen to apply the term "Insular Christianity" to the Christian practice that arose around the Irish Sea. Others, most notably Eastern Orthodox apologists, believe that, up until the East-West Schism of 1054, Ireland effectively practised a provincial form of Eastern Orthodox Christianity.

== Palladius and Patrick ==
According to Prosper of Aquitaine, Palladius was from a noble family in Gaul. In 429, he was serving as a deacon in Rome. The Pope commissioned him to send Germanus, Bishop of Auxerre, to investigate rumours of Pelagianism in Britain. In 431, Pope Celestine I consecrated Palladius a bishop and sent him to minister to the "Scots believing in Christ". His mission mainly seems to have been to Irish Christians in the east midlands, Leinster, and perhaps east Munster. It is uncertain if he converted any Irish. What little is known of his mission is that it appears to have been successful, though it was later downplayed by partisans of Patrick.

Saint Patrick's dates are uncertain. All that can be said is that he was alive sometime in the fifth century, and was a missionary bishop rather than ministering to Christians. His areas appear to have been Ulster and north Connacht, but very little can be said with certainty about him. Later tradition from the seventh-century onwards is known to be unreliable.

== Native ministries and Irish monasteries ==
Monastic establishments arose in the sixth century, such as Clonard, founded by St. Finian, Clonfert by St. Brendan, Bangor by St. Comgall, Clonmacnoise by St. Kieran, Killeaney by St. Enda; and, in the seventh century, Lismore by St. Carthage and Glendalough by St. Kevin.

In 563, St. Columba, a native of Donegal, accompanied by a few companions, crossed the sea to Caledonia and founded a monastery on the desolate island of Iona. Further fresh arrivals came from Ireland and the monastery, with Columba as its abbot, was soon a flourishing institution, from which the Dalriadian Scots in the south and the Picts beyond the Grampians were evangelized. When Columba died in 597, Christianity had been preached and received in every district in Caledonia, and in every island along its west coast. In the next century Iona had so prospered that its abbot, St. Adamnan, wrote in excellent Latin the "Life of St. Columba". From Iona, the Irish Aidan and his Irish companions had gone south to evangelize Northumbria, Mercia, and Essex.

== Missionaries abroad ==
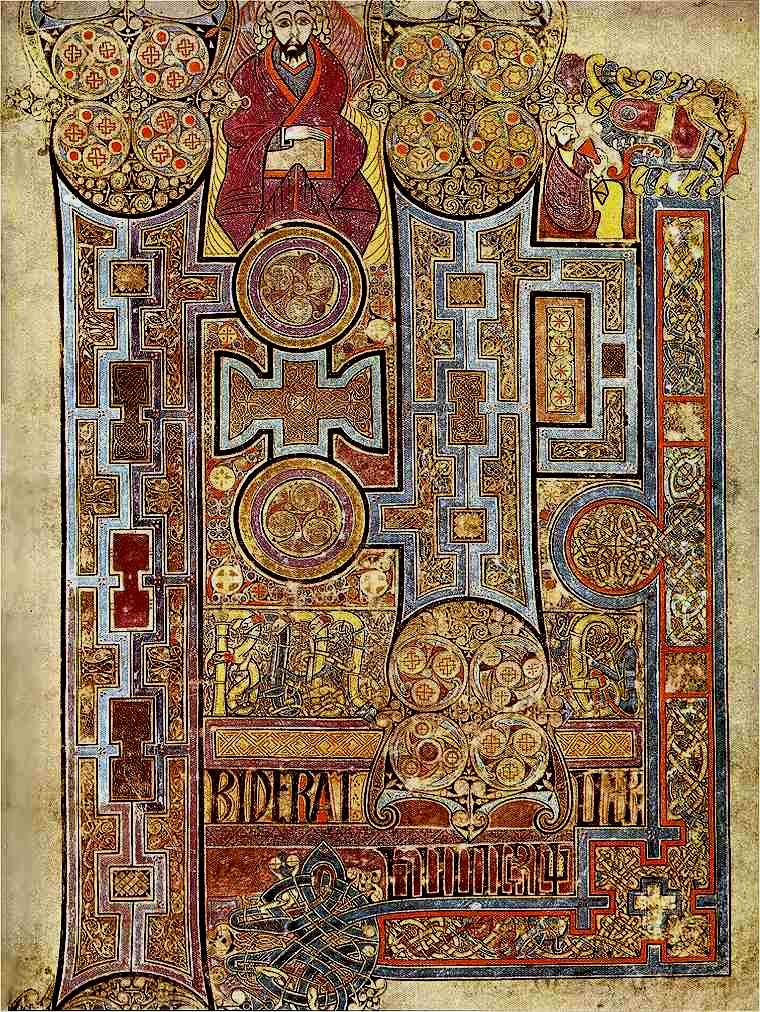
A page from the Book of Kells that opens the Gospel of John

Missionaries from Ireland to England and Continental Europe spread news of the flowering of learning, and scholars from other nations came to Irish monasteries. The excellence and isolation of these monasteries helped preserve Latin learning during the Early Middle Ages. The period of Insular art, mainly in the fields of illuminated manuscripts, metalworking, and sculpture flourished and produced such treasures as the Book of Kells, the Ardagh Chalice, and the many carved stone crosses that dot the island.

These monasteries served as sanctuary to many of the continent's great scholars and theologians. It was here that the lamp of Latin learning was preserved for the ages. During this age, the great illuminated manuscripts of Ireland were produced. Arguably the finest such work is The Book of Kells which may still be viewed at Trinity College, Dublin.

The first significant renewal of learning in the West came with the Carolingian Renaissance of the Early Middle Ages. Charlemagne, advised by Peter of Pisa and Alcuin of York, attracted the scholars of England and Ireland, and by decree in AD 787 established schools in every abbey in his empire. These schools, from which the name scholasticism is derived, became centres of medieval learning. During the early Scholastic period, knowledge of the Greek language had vanished in the West except in Ireland, where it was widely dispersed in the monastic schools.

Irish scholars had a considerable presence in the Frankish court, where they were renowned for their learning. Among them was Johannes Scotus Eriugena, one of the founders of scholasticism. Eriugena was the most significant Irish intellectual of the early monastic period, and an outstanding philosopher in terms of originality. He had considerable familiarity with the Greek language, and translated many works into Latin, affording access to the Cappadocian Fathers and the Greek theological tradition.

== Arrival of the Vikings ==
During the ninth and tenth centuries, waves of Norse warriors ransacked the countryside. The monasteries were favourite targets for their treasures of golden religious ornaments.

As the eighth century neared its close, religion and learning still flourished, but unexpected dangers approached and a new enemy came, before whose assaults monk and monastery and saint and scholar disappeared. These invaders were the Danes from the coasts of Scandinavia. Pagans and pirates, they were formidable foes both on land and sea.

In Ireland as elsewhere they attacked the monasteries and churches, desecrated the altars, carried away the gold and silver vessels; smoking ruins and murdered monks attested to the fury of their assaults. Under native and Christian chiefs churches were destroyed, church lands appropriated by laymen, monastic schools deserted, and lay abbots ruled at Armagh and elsewhere. Bishops were consecrated without sees and conferred orders for money; there was chaos in church government and corruption everywhere.

In a series of synods beginning with Ráth Breasail (1118) and including Kells (1152), at which the Pope's legate presided, many salutary enactments were passed, and for the first time diocesan episcopacy was established. Meanwhile, St. Malachy, Archbishop of Armagh, had done very remarkable work in his own diocese and elsewhere. His early death in 1148 was a heavy blow to the cause of church reform. Nor could so many evils be cured in a single life, or by the labours of a single man; and in spite of his efforts and the efforts of others the decrees of synods were often flouted, and the new diocesan boundaries ignored.

== Anglo-Normans ==
In December 1154, Henry Plantagenet, Duke of Normandy and Aquitaine, by the Treaty of Wallingford and a large fleet, became in addition Henry II, King of England. In that same month an Englishman, Nicholas Breakspeare, was elected Pope Adrian IV. Henry intended, as shown by his later Constitutions of Clarendon, to establish the supremacy of the civil law and courts above the ecclesiastical law and courts. In the first full year of Henry's reign (1155) he procured the papal bull Laudabiliter from the Hertfordshire-born Pope Adrian IV, authorizing Henry to proceed to conquer Ireland "to check the torrent of wickedness to reform evil manners, to sow the seeds of virtue". The quid pro quo was the condition that a penny should be yearly paid from each house to the See of Rome (the still extant Peter's Pence). Henry and the Pope also had other reasons (see Henry II, section "Lordship over Ireland"). The invasion was put aside while Henry attended to other matters. Henry continued to battle the supreme power of the Church, and Thomas Becket in England. In 1166, Henry took the opportunity to accede to the request by displaced Irish Rí of Leinster, Diarmait Mac Murchada, for assistance in regaining his Irish territory. A first contingent of the Norman Invasion of Ireland came to Ireland in 1169 under Maurice Fitzgerald, followed by a stronger force under Strongbow (Richard de Clare, 2nd Earl of Pembroke) in 1170, the year Thomas à Beckett was murdered. In 1171 Henry himself landed at Waterford and proceeded to Dublin, where he spent the winter, and received the submission of all but two Irish chiefs. This submission was outlined in the Treaty of Windsor 1175.

== Reformation and beyond ==
It was not until the end of the 17th century that the English Crown later British Crown gained full control of Ireland by means of a series of military campaigns in the period 1534–1691. During this period, the island was progressively colonised by English and Scottish Protestant settlers. Most of the Irish remained Roman Catholic.

=== Henry VIII ===
Henry VIII decided to destroy the power of the Anglo-Norman kings and take control of Ireland. As he did so, he put English lords in charge of confiscated land and plundered the Catholic monasteries and churches, as he had done in England. In 1536 during the Reformation, Henry arranged to be declared head of the Church in Ireland through an act of the Irish Parliament. When the Church of England was reformed under Edward VI, so too was the Church of Ireland.

In the beginning of his reign, Henry VIII was preoccupied with more pressing matters in England and on the European Continent, and therefore paid little attention to Ireland. It was not until he had reigned for a quarter of a century on the throne that he turned his attention to Ireland and then it was primarily due to his conflict with the Church over his marriage to Catherine of Aragon. Then Parliament passed the Act of Supremacy, which invested Henry with spiritual jurisdiction over England and proclaimed him head of the Church of England rather than the Pope. When the proctors of the clergy refused to agree to this measure, Henry deprived them of the right of voting, confiscated church lands and ordered monasteries closed, in some cases resulting in bloodshed.

=== Elizabeth I ===
Fearing Ireland's Catholicism and strategic value for her enemies, Elizabeth consolidated English power in Ireland.

The established church in Ireland underwent a period of more radical Calvinist doctrine than occurred in England. James Ussher (later Archbishop of Armagh) authored the Irish Articles, adopted in 1615. In 1634, the Irish Convocation adopted the English Thirty-Nine Articles alongside the Irish Articles. After the Restoration of 1660, it seems that the Thirty-Nine Articles took precedence; they remain the official doctrine of the Church of Ireland even after disestablishment.

The English-speaking minority mostly adhered to the Church of Ireland or to Presbyterianism, while the Irish-speaking majority remained faithful to the Latin liturgy of Roman Catholicism. From this period on, sectarian conflict became a recurrent theme in Irish history.

=== Translation of the Bible into Irish ===
The first Irish translation of the New Testament was begun by Nicholas Walsh, Bishop of Ossory, who worked on it until he was murdered in 1585. The work was continued by John Kearny, his assistant, and Nehemiah Donellan, Archbishop of Tuam; it was finally completed by William O'Domhnuill (William Daniell, Archbishop of Tuam in succession to Donellan). Their work was printed in 1602. The work of translating the Old Testament was undertaken by William Bedel (1571–1642), Bishop of Kilmore, who completed his translation within the reign of Charles I, although it was not published until 1680 in a revised version by Narcissus Marsh (1638–1713), Archbishop of Dublin. William Bedell had undertaken a translation of the Book of Common Prayer in 1606. An Irish translation of the revised prayer book of 1662 was effected by John Richardson (1664–1747) and published in 1712.

The first translation of the entire Bible that was approved by the church was An Bíobla Naofa, supervised by Pádraig Ó Fiannachta at Maynooth and published in 1981.

== Persecution and Penal Laws ==
The Irish Confederate Wars resulted in much destruction of church property. Irish Catholics were severely persecuted under Oliver Cromwell, their situation only slightly improving under the Stuart kings. The land settlements in the aftermath of these wars, and the defeat of James II in 1691, reduced Irish Catholic freeholders to a fraction of their previous size. The introduction of the Penal Laws further proscribed the practise of Roman Catholicism, with many priests and bishops forced into hiding or exile. Not until the 1770s did the religious climate relax, somewhat.

== Protestant ascendancy (1691–1801) ==
Before the Stuart accession, Ireland was divided into thirty-four boroughs. In 1613, forty new boroughs were created, all of them dominated by Protestants. The consequence of this was the reduction of the Catholic majority in the Irish parliament to a minority. By the end of the seventeenth century all Catholics, representing some 85% of Ireland's population then, were banned from the Irish parliament. As a result, political power rested entirely in the hands of a British settler-colonial, and more specifically Anglican, minority while the Catholic population suffered severe political and economic privations.

By the late 18th century, many of the Anglo-Irish ruling class had come to see Ireland as their native country. A parliamentary faction led by Henry Grattan agitated for a more favourable trading relationship with England and for greater legislative independence for the Parliament of Ireland. However, reform in Ireland stalled over the more radical proposals to enfranchise Irish Catholics. This was enabled in 1793, but Catholics could not yet enter parliament or become government officials.

=== Oath of Allegiance ===
By the Treaty of Limerick the Catholic soldiers of King James were pardoned, protected against forfeiture of their estates, and were free to go abroad if they chose. All Catholics might substitute an oath of allegiance for the oath of supremacy, and were to have such privileges "as were consistent with the laws of Ireland, or as they did enjoy in the reign of Charles II". King William also promised to have the Irish Parliament grant a further relaxation of the penal laws in force. This treaty, however, was soon torn to shreds, and in spite of William's appeals the Irish Parliament refused to ratify it, and embarked on fresh penal legislation. Under these new laws Catholics were excluded from Parliament, from the bench and bar, from the army and navy, from all civil offices, from the corporations, and even from the corporate towns. They could not have Catholic schools at home or attend foreign schools, or inherit landed property, or hold land under lease, or act as executors or administrators, or have arms or ammunition, or a horse worth £5. Neither could they bury their dead in Catholic ruins, or make pilgrimages to holy wells, or observe Catholic holidays. They could not intermarry with the Protestants, the clergyman assisting at such marriages being liable to death. The wife of a Catholic landlord turning Protestant got separate maintenance; the son turning Protestant got the whole estate; and the Catholic landlord having only Catholic children was obliged at death to divide his estate among his children in equal shares. All the regular clergy, as well as bishops and vicars-general, should quit the kingdom. The secular clergy might remain, but must be registered, nor could they have on their churches either steeple or bell.

In 1728, the Catholics outnumbered Protestants five-to-one. A few Catholics managed to hold their estates with the collaboration of friendly Protestants; the remainder gradually sank to the level of cottiers and day-labourers, reduced to a standard of living far below what they had been used to. Many Catholics chose to emigrate in the hopes of finding a more congenial environment.

=== Irish Parliament and the Passing of Tolerance ===
In the Irish Parliament meanwhile a spirit of independence appeared. As the Parliament of the Pale it had been so often used for factious purposes that in 1496 Poynings' Law was passed, providing that henceforth no Irish Parliament could meet, and no law could be proposed, without the previous consent of both the Irish and English Privy Councils. Further, the English Parliament claimed the right to legislate for Ireland; and in the laws prohibiting the importation of Irish cattle (1665), and Irish woollen manufactures (1698), and that dealing with the Irish forfeited estates (1700), it asserted its supposed right.

When one member, Molyneux, protested, the English Parliament condemned him, and ordered his book to be burned by the common hangman. Moreover, it passed the Declaratory Act 1719, expressly declaring that it had power to legislate for Ireland, taking away also the appellate jurisdiction of the Irish House of Lords. The fight made by Swift against Wood's halfpence showed that, though Molyneux was dead, his spirit lived; Lucas continued the fight, and Grattan in 1782 obtained legislative independence.

In 1778 by an act enabling Catholics to hold all lands under lease; and in 1782 by a further act allowing them to erect Catholic schools with the permission of the Protestant bishop of the diocese, to own a horse worth more than £5, and to assist at Mass without being compelled to accuse the officiating priest. Nor were Catholic bishops any longer compelled to quit the kingdom, nor Catholic children specially rewarded if they turned Protestant. Not for ten years was there any further concession, and then an act was passed allowing Catholics to erect schools without seeking Protestant permission, admitting Catholics to the Bar, and legalizing marriages between Protestants and Catholics. Much more important was the Roman Catholic Relief Act 1793 giving the Catholics the parliamentary and municipal franchise, admitting them to the universities and to military and civil offices, and removing all restrictions in regard to the tenure of land. They were still excluded from Parliament, from the inner Bar, and from a few of the higher civil and military offices.

Always in favour of religious liberty, Grattan would have swept away every vestige of the Penal code. But, in 1782, he mistakenly thought that his work was done when legislative independence was conceded. He forgot that the executive was still left independent of Parliament, answerable only to the English ministry; and that, with rotten boroughs controlled by a few great families, with an extremely limited franchise in the counties, and with pensioners and placemen filling so many seats, the Irish Parliament was but a mockery of representation.

Like Grattan, Flood and Charlemont favoured parliamentary reform, but, unlike him, they were opposed to Catholic concessions. As for Foster and Fitzgibbon, who led the forces of corruption and bigotry, they opposed every attempt at reform, and consented to the Roman Catholic Relief Act 1793 only under strong pressure from Pitt and Dundas. These English ministers, alarmed at the progress of French revolutionary principles in Ireland, fearing a foreign invasion, wished to have the Catholics contented. In 1795 further concessions seemed imminent. In that year an illiberal viceroy, Lord Westmoreland, was replaced by the liberal-minded Lord Fitzwilliam, who came understanding it to be the wish of Pitt that the Catholic claims were to be conceded. He at once dismissed from office a rapacious office-holder named Beresford, so powerful that he was called the "King of Ireland"; he refused to consult Lord Chancellor Fitzgibbon or Foster, the Speaker; he took Grattan and Ponsonby into his confidence, and declared his intention to support Grattan's bill admitting Catholics to Parliament. The high hopes raised by these events were dashed to the earth when Fitzwilliam was suddenly recalled, after having been allowed to go so far without any protest from Portland, the home secretary, or from the premier, Pitt. The latter, disliking the Irish Parliament because it had rejected his commercial propositions in 1785, and disagreed with him on the regency in 1789, already mediated a legislative union, and felt that the admission of Catholics to Parliament would thwart his plans. He was probably also influenced by Beresford, who had powerful friends in England, and by the king, whom Fitzgibbon had mischievously convinced that to admit Catholics to Parliament would be to violate his coronation oath. Possibly, other causes concurred with these to bring about the sudden and disastrous change which filled Catholic Ireland with grief, and the whole nation with dismay.

The new viceroy, Lord Camden, was instructed to conciliate the Catholic bishops by setting up a Catholic college for the training of Irish priests; this was done by the establishment of Maynooth College. But he was to set his face against all parliamentary reform and all Catholic concessions. These things he did with a will. He at once restored Beresford to office and Foster and Fitzgibbon to favour, the latter being made Earl of Clare. And he stirred up but too successfully the dying embers of sectarian hate, with the result that the Ulster factions, the Protestant "Peep-of-Day Boys" and the Catholic "Defenders", became embittered with a change of names. The latter, turning to republican and revolutionary ways, joined the United Irish Society; the former became merged in the recently formed Orange Society, taking its name from William of Orange and having Protestant ascendancy and hatred of Catholicism as its battle cries. Extending from Ulster, these rival societies brought into the other provinces the curse of sectarian strife. Instead of putting down both, the government took sides with the Orangemen; and, while their lawless acts were condoned, the Catholics were hunted down. An Arms' Act, an Insurrection Act, an Indemnity Act, a suspension of the Habeas Corpus Act 1679 placed them outside the pale of law. An undisciplined soldiery, recruited from the Orange lodges, were then let loose among them. Martial law, free quarters, flogging, picketing, half-hanging, destruction of Catholic property and life, outrages on women followed, until at last Catholic blood was turned into flame. Then Wexford rose. Looking back, it now seems certain that, had Hoche landed at Bantry in 1796, had even a small force landed at Wexford in 1798, or a few other counties displayed the heroism of Wexford, English power in Ireland would, temporarily at least, have been destroyed. But one county could not fight the British Empire, and the rebellion was soon quenched in blood.

Camden's place was then given to Lord Cornwallis, who came to Ireland for the express purpose of carrying a Legislative Union. Foster refused to support him and joined the opposition. Fitzgibbon, however, aided Cornwallis, and so did Castlereagh, who for some time had discharged the duties of chief secretary in the absence of Mr. Pelham, and who was now formally appointed to the office. And then began one of the most shameful chapters in Irish history. Even the corrupt Irish Parliament was reluctant to vote away its existence, and in 1799 the opposition was too strong for Castlereagh. But Pitt directed him to persevere, and the great struggle went on. On one side were eloquence and debating power, patriotism, and public virtue, Grattan, Plunket, and Bushe, Foster, Fitzgerald, Ponsonby, and Moore, a truly formidable combination. On the other side were the baser elements of in Parliament, the needy, the spendthrift, the meanly ambitious, operated upon by Castlereagh, with the whole resources of the British Empire at his command. The pensioners and placemen who voted against him at once lost their places and pensions, the military officer was refused promotion, the magistrate was turned off the bench. And while anti-Unionists were unsparingly punished, the Unionists got lavish rewards. The impecunious got well-paid sinecures; the briefless barrister was made a judge or a commissioner; the rich man, ambitious of social distinction, got a peerage, and places and pensions for his friends; and the owners of rotten boroughs large sums for their interests. The Catholics were promised emancipation in a united Parliament, and in consequence many bishops, some clergy, and a few of the laity supported the Union, not grudging to end an assembly so bigoted and corrupt as the Irish Parliament. By these means Castlereagh triumphed, and in 1801 the United Parliament of Great Britain and Ireland opened its doors.

=== Other Protestant denominations ===
The Presbyterian Church in Ireland is the second-largest Christian denomination in Ireland, it dates from the time of the Plantation of Ulster in 1610, with the first Presbyterians coming from Scotland, most presbyterian churches can trace their origins back to the Synod of Ulster (1649), the Presbytery of Dublin (1665) or the Presbytery of Munster (1665). The Religious Society of Friends (Quakers) held their first meeting of worship in Ireland was in 1654, at the home of William Edmundson, in Lurgan. A number of quaker communities developed in Mountmellick, Baltimore and Dublin. The Methodist Church of Ireland, developed from within the established Anglican communion. Its founder John Wesley visited Ireland on twenty-one occasions between 1747 and 1789. Unitarian Church in Ireland in Ireland originates in the early 17th century, along with other non-conformist reformed faith groups.

=== Catholic Emancipation ===
The next quarter of a century was a period of unrequited hope. Dr. Troy, the Archbishop of Dublin, had been a strong advocate of the Union, and had induced nine of his brother bishops to concede a veto on episcopal appointments, not uncommon in European monarchies. In return, he wanted Emancipation linked with the Union. Castlereagh was not averse; but Pitt was publicly non-committal and vague, though the Catholic Unionists had no doubt that he favoured linking concession with passage of the Union thereby creating a totally new dispensation for a United Kingdom. Disappointment ensued when nothing was done in the first session of the United Parliament, and it was increased when Pitt resigned office and was succeeded by Addington, the narrow-minded Speaker. Cornwallis, however, assured Dr. Troy that Pitt had resigned, unable to overcome the reluctance of King George III, who believed it contravened the Act of Settlement, and his coronation oath. Pitt declared that he would never again take office if emancipation were not conceded. In spite of this, he became Premier again in 1804, no longer an advocate of emancipation having pledged never again to raise the question in Parliament during the lifetime of the king. To this pledge he was as faithful as he had been false to his former assurances; when Fox presented the Catholic petition in 1805, Pitt opposed it. After 1806, when both Pitt and Fox died, the Catholic champion was Grattan, who had entered the British Parliament in 1805. In the vain hope of conciliating opponents he was willing, in 1808, to concede the veto. Dr. Troy and the higher Catholics acquiesced. The other bishops were unwilling, and rejected the offer of a state-paid clergy or state-appointed bishops. The agitation of the question, however, did not cease, and for many years it distracted Catholic plans and weakened Catholic effort. Further complications arose when, in 1814, the prefect of the Propaganda, Quarantotti, issued a rescript favouring the veto. He acted, however, beyond his powers in the absence of Pius VII, who was in France. When the Pope returned to Rome, after the fall of Napoleon, the rescript was disavowed.

In these years the Catholics badly needed a leader. John Keogh, the able leader of 1793, was then old, and Lords Fingall and Gormanstone, Mr. Scully and Dr. Dromgoole, were not the men to grapple with great difficulties and powerful opponents. An abler and more vigorous leader was required, one with less faith in petitions and protestations of loyalty. Such a leader was found in Daniel O'Connell, a Catholic barrister whose first public appearance in 1800 was on an anti-Unionist platform. A great lawyer and orator, a great debater, of boundless courage and resources, he took a prominent part on Catholic committees, and from 1810 he held the first place in Catholic esteem. Yet the Catholic cause advanced slowly, and, when Grattan died in 1820, emancipation had not come. Nor would the House of Lords accept Plunket's Bill of 1821, even though it passed the House of Commons and conceded the veto. At last O'Connell determined to rouse the masses, and in 1823, with the help of Richard Lalor Sheil, he founded the Catholic Association. Its progress at first was slow, but gradually it gathered strength. Dr. Murray, the new Catholic Archbishop of Dublin, joined it, and Dr. Doyle, the great Bishop of Kildare; other bishops followed; the clergy and people also came in; and thus rose a great national organization, supervising from its central office in Dublin subsidiary associations in every parish; maintained by a Catholic rent; watching over local and national affairs, discharging, as Mr. Canning described it, "all the functions of a regular government, and having obtained a complete mastery and control over the masses of the Irish people". The Association was suppressed in 1825 by an act of Parliament; but O'Connell merely changed the name; and the New Catholic Association with its New Catholic rent continued the work of agitation as of old. Nor was this all. By the Roman Catholic Relief Act 1793 the forty-shilling freeholders obtained the franchise. These freeholders were in the power of the landlords. Protected by a powerful association, and encouraged by the priests and by O'Connell, the freeholders broke free. In Waterford, Louth, Meath, and elsewhere they voted for the nominees of the Catholic Association at elections, and humbled the landlords. They returned O'Connell himself for Clare in 1828. The Tory ministers, Wellington and Peel, steered the passage of the Catholic Relief Bill of 1829. The forty-shilling freeholders, however, were temporarily disfranchised, and provisions excluding Catholics from some of the higher civil and military offices, prohibiting priests from wearing vestments outside their churches, bishops from assuming the titles of their sees, and clergy from obtaining charitable bequests. In other respects UK Roman Catholics were placed on a level with other denominations, and at last were fully admitted within to the benefits fruits of the constitution.

The Irish Catholics had several grievances still calling for redress: the established state Church, landlordism, and educational inequality. Mr. Gladstone commenced with the Church of Ireland. He introduced a bill disendowing and disestablishing it. Commissioners were appointed to wind it up, taking charge of its property, then computed at more than £15,000,000. Of this sum, £11,000,000 was given to the disestablished Church, part to the holders of existing offices, part to enable the Church to continue its work. A further sum of nearly £1,000,000 was distributed between Maynooth College, deprived of its annual grant, and the Presbyterian Church deprived of the Regium Donum, the latter getting twice as much as the former. The surplus was to be disposed of by Parliament for such public objects as it might determine.

== Free State and Republic (1922–present) ==
Political map of Ireland

The state could not discriminate on religious grounds according to Article 8 of the 1922 Constitution of the Irish Free State. Article 44 of the 1937 Constitution recognised the Roman Church as the faith of the great majority of the citizens, with the state also recognising the Church of Ireland, the Presbyterian Church in Ireland, the Methodist Church in Ireland, the Religious Society of Friends in Ireland (Quakers), as well as the Jewish Congregations (very progressive for the 1930s) and the other religious denominations, (however this article was removed by the 5th amendment to the constitution).

The Roman Catholic Church has had a powerful influence over the Irish state since the Constitution of 1922, although that influence has diminished somewhat in recent decades. The clergy's influence meant that the Irish state had very conservative social policies, banning, for example, divorce, contraception, abortion and pornography as well as encouraging the censoring of many books and films. In addition the church largely controlled the state's hospitals and schools and remained the largest provider of many other social services.

With the partition of Ireland in 1922, 92.6% of the Free State's population were Catholic while 7.4% were Protestant. By the 1960s, the Protestant population had fallen by half. Although emigration was high among all the population, due to a lack of economic opportunity, the rate of Protestant emigration was disproportionate in this period. Many Protestants left the country in the early 1920s, either because they felt unwelcome in a predominantly Catholic and nationalist state, because they were afraid due to the burning of Protestant homes (particularly of the old landed class) by republicans during the civil war, because they regarded themselves as British and did not wish to live in an independent Irish state, or because of the economic disruption caused by the recent violence. The Catholic Church had also issued a decree, known as Ne Temere, whereby the children of marriages between Catholics and Protestants had to be brought up as Catholics.

== Sexual abuse scandals ==
Since the early 1990s, the Catholic Church in Ireland has been rocked by many cases of sexual abuse. Enquiries established that thousands of priests had raped countless children in previous decades. In many cases, the abusing priests(rapists) were moved to other parishes to avoid embarrassment or a scandal, assisted by senior clergy. By 2010 a number of in-depth judicial reports had been published, but with relatively few prosecutions.

== Influence on Irish society ==
=== Ireland ===
==== Politics ====
In the Irish Free State, now Ireland, the church had a great influence on public opinion as it had supervised public education for about 90% of the population since at least the 1830s. Historically it was associated with the Jacobite movement until 1766, and with Irish nationalism after Catholic emancipation was secured in 1829. The church was resurgent between 1829 and the disestablishment of the Church of Ireland in 1869–71, when its most significant leaders included Bishop James Doyle, Cardinal Cullen and Archbishop MacHale. The hierarchy supported the democratic and mainly non-violent Irish Parliamentary Party in the 1880s, and its offshoots, and the policy of Irish Home Rule in 1886–1920. It did not support the Irish republican movement until 1921, as it espoused violence, in spite of support from many individual priests, and opposed the anti-Treaty side in the Irish Civil War. Despite this relative moderation, Irish Protestants were concerned that a self-governing Ireland would result in "Rome Rule" instead of home rule, and this became an element in the creation of Northern Ireland.

Major popular church events attended by the political world have included the Eucharistic Congress in 1932 and the Papal Visit in 1979. The last prelate with strong social and political interests was Archbishop McQuaid, who retired in 1972.

==== Education ====
After independence in 1922, the Church remained heavily involved in health care and education, raising money and running institutions which were staffed by Catholic religious institutes, largely because the new state remained impoverished. Its main political effect was to continue to run schools where religious education was a major element. The hierarchy opposed the free public secondary schools service introduced in 1968 by Donogh O'Malley, in part because they ran almost all such schools. Some have argued that the church's strong efforts since the 1830s to continue the control of Catholic education was primarily to guarantee a continuing source of candidates for the priesthood, as they would have years of training before entering a seminary.

==== Health care ====
From 1930 hospitals were funded by a sweepstake (lottery) with tickets frequently distributed or sold by nuns or priests. On health matters it was seen as unsympathetic to women's needs and in 1950 it opposed the Mother and Child Scheme.

==== Morality and censorship ====
It helped reinforce public censorship and maintained its own list of banned literature which influenced the State's list. Divorce allowing remarriage was banned in 1924 (though it had been rare), and selling artificial contraception was made illegal. The Church's influence slipped somewhat after 1970, impacted partly by the media and the growing feminist movement. For instance, the Health (Family Planning) Act 1979 showed the ability of the Catholic Church to force the government into a compromise situation over artificial contraception, though unable to get the result it wanted; contraception could now be bought, but only with a prescription from a doctor and supplied only by registered chemists. In 1983, the Eighth Amendment of the Constitution of Ireland introduced the constitutional prohibition of abortion, which the Church supported, though abortion for social reasons remains illegal under Irish statute law. However the Church failed to influence the June 1996 removal of the constitutional prohibition of divorce. While the church had opposed divorce allowing remarriage in civil law, its canon law allowed for a law of nullity and a limited divorce "a mensa et thoro", effectively a form of marital separation. In a further repudiation of the church's teaching, on 22 May 2015, 62% of Irish voters approved the legalization of same-sex marriage in Ireland.

=== Northern Ireland ===
The Government of Ireland Act of 1920 acted as the constitution of Northern Ireland, in which was enshrined freedom of religion for all of Northern Ireland's citizens. Here Roman Catholics formed a minority of some 35% of the population, which had mostly supported Irish nationalism and was therefore historically opposed to the creation of Northern Ireland.

The Roman Catholic schools' council was at first resistant in accepting the role of the government of Northern Ireland, and initially accepted funding only from the government of the Irish Free State and admitting no school inspectors. Thus it was that the Lynn Committee presented a report to the government, from which an Education Bill was created to update the education system in Northern Ireland, without any co-operation from the Roman Catholic section in education. Instead, in regard to the Roman Catholic schools, the report relied on the guidance of a Roman Catholic who was to become the Permanent Secretary to the Minister of Education — A. N. Bonaparte Wyse.

We hope that, notwithstanding the disadvantage at which we were placed by this action, it will be found that Roman Catholic interests have not suffered. We have throughout been careful to keep in mind and to make allowance for the particular points of view of Roman Catholics in regard to education so far as known to us, and it has been our desire to refrain as far as we could from recommending any course which might be thought to be contrary to their wishes.

— Lynn Commission report, 1923

Many commentators have suggested that the separate education systems in Northern Ireland after 1921 prolonged the sectarian divisions in that community.

=== Vatican II ===
In both parts of Ireland Church policy and practice changed markedly after the Vatican II reforms of 1962. Probably the largest change was that Mass could be said in vernacular languages and not in Latin, and in 1981 the Church commissioned its first edition of the Bible in Irish.

== Immigration and New Christian Communities in Ireland ==
The late twentieth and the early twenty-first century has seen a considerable increase in immigration into Ireland, while a large number of migrants belong to the traditional churches that were in Ireland, a large number have come from different denominations, which has led to the development of these communities and churches to cater for them. A Russian Orthodox Church was first opened in Ireland in 1973 and a Greek Orthodox church was first established in Dublin in 1981 and a Romanian Orthodox Church in 2000. Antiochian Orthodox Church was established in 2004 in Ireland; it has three parishes, in Belfast, Dublin, and Tralee. Ukrainian Greek Catholic Church is in communion with the Roman Catholic church, using the church in Clonliffe College for its services. The Chinese Gospel Church of Ireland hosts services in Dublin, Lucan, Bray, Limerick and Drogheda. The Redeemed Christian Church of God (RCCG), an African Protestant Pentecostal evangelical church, established its first church in Ireland in 1998 in Mary's Abbey in Dublin. Also in 1998 the Cherubim and Seraphim (Nigerian church) inaugurated its first church in Ireland; today there are seven branches of the church.

There has been a large growth in the Polish community in Ireland particularly since the expansion of the European Union in 2002, St Audoen's Church, Dublin (Roman Catholic) on High St., in Dublin, is used by the community and the Polish chaplaincy is based here. St Joseph's Filipino Community based at the Carmelite Church in Berkeley Road, Dublin.

== See also ==
- Catholic Church in Ireland
- Eucharistic Congress of Dublin (1932)
- History of Ireland
- Protestantism in Ireland
- Quakers in Ireland
- Association of Baptist Churches in Ireland
- Christian Churches Ireland (Pentecostal)
- Congregational Union of Ireland
- Lutheran Church in Ireland
- Irish Evangelical Society
