= Murrough mac Toirdelbach Ó Briain =

Murrough mac Toirdelbach Ó Briain, Chief of the Name, the Clan Tiege of Aran, fl. 1575 – 1588.

== Family background ==
Ó Briain was the senior member of the Mac Teige, or Clan Teige Ó Briain, of Inishmore, in Galway Bay. They were descended from Teige Ó Briain, great-grandson of Brian Boru, from whom they took their name. The Ó Briain Kings of Thomond had exercised rule of the three Aran Islands since before the Anglo-Irish settled in Connacht, and, in return for protection of their shipping to and from the town, The Tribes of Galway paid them an annual tribute of wine "in consideration of their protection and expenses in guarding the bay and harbour of Galway against pirates and coast plunderers."

== Mortgage dispute ==
On 14 July 1575, Ó Briain arrived in Galway to make a complaint to the town corporation. He had been appointed, the previous month, by a delegation of nine of the Clan Tiege to be " their attorney for ransoming the isles of Aron from James Linche, and agreed that all such parts as he should so ransom should belong to him, and his heirs for ever." James Lynch (fitz Ambrose) (Mayor of Galway, 1590–91) was a Galway merchant who, previously to July 1575, obtained a mortgage of all three islands from Ó Briain; and in case of the extinction of the entire Clan Tiege, "should be their sole heir and possess Aron and their whole islands."

However, it was afterwards agreed that this clause should be extended "to the whole commons and corporacion of Galway", provided that the Clan Tiege not alienate any part of the lands elsewhere, without the corporation's approval.

"Mem. the 14 of July, one Morchowe Mac Tirriligh Mac Donill, chief of his nacion, called Clanteige of Aron, appeared before the mayor, bailiffs and combrethern, claiminge to have the ancient custom of Connowe and Meales due to him and to his auncestors within the town, to say, for two days and two nights, and the mayor, &c., calling before them auncient old credibel persons, they declared upon their oaths that they never heard of their parence, or saw the said sept have no more within this town but only two meales. It was thereupon ordered that said sept shall have no more but that two, they being always bound to serve, attend and wait upon us and in our service, as their auncestors hath bene; also the said sept is bound to give the accustomed Meales and Connowe to all the comenc of Galway when they shall repaire to the isles of Aron; and the may, &c. did grant and promise to be aydors, helpers, mayntainers and assisters of said Clanteige against all persons that would lay siege, spoille or raise the said islands or castell of Aron, or otherwise wrong the said Morchowe or his sept. "

== Aftermath ==
The dispute, perhaps related to the severe unrest in Connacht in the 1570s, seems to have eventually settled amicably. Further documentation, dated 30 March 1588, outlines the terms, which Hardiman gives as follows:

"It was signed on 30 March 1588, by John Blake, the mayor, and Walter Martin and Anthony Kirrivan, bailiffs, and countersiged by Anthony Dermot, notary, whereby the testify to Queen Elizabeth in favor of Murrogh Mac Turlogh O'Brien, then living, that the Mac Tieges of Arran his ancestors, were, under her Majesty and her predecessors, the temporal captains or lords of the islands of Arran, and their territories and hereditaments elsewhere, under the name of Mac Tiege O'Brien of Arran, time out of man's memory; and that they had seen the said Murrogh Mac Turlogh, authorised by all his sept, as chief of that name, and in possession of the premises as his own lawful inheritance, as more at large, say they, doth appear in our books of records, wherein he continued, until of late he was, by the usurping power of the O'Flaherties, expulsed, from whom it is taken by some inquest found in her Majesty's favor. 'We say moreover', add they, 'that the sept of Mac Tiege O'Brien of Arran, since the foundation of this city and town, were aiding and assisting to ourselves and our predecessors against her Majesty's and her predecessors enemies, in all times and places whereunto they were called, as true, faithful and liege people to the crown of England, to maintain, succour and assist the town."

However, the petition seems to have been ignored, because by 1581 the family had been overthrown by Murrough na dTuadh Ó Flaithbheartaigh, who had seizing control over the Aran since as early as 1569. This would have rendered the document of 1588 worthless.

== Fate of the Ó Briains of Aran ==
By 1641 the islands had reverted to the ownership of Sir Roebuck Lynch of Galway, the heir of James. However, Murrough's descendants plotted with Boetius Clancy of County Clare to retake them. The Earl of Clanricarde was apprised of the scheme. In a letter to the Earl of Thomond he wrote:

"Amongst all (places) I find none more necessary to be preserved than the Isles of Arran. These are now in the possession and inheritance of Sir Roebuck Lynch, son to Sir Henry. I am now informed that Boetius Clancy the younger and the Clan-Teige of Thomond under pretence of some antiquated claim intend to invade it, and request that you take steps to prevent it."

This was the final recorded association of the clan with the islands.

James Hardiman lastly states that a copy of Murrough's petition of 1588 was then (1820) held by John O'Brien of Clonthis, County Limerick, "who is now the direct chief of that princely family."

== See also ==
- Diarmaid Mór Ó Briain of Tromra, fl. 13th/14th century
- Mahon mac Turlough Mantach Ó Briain, Chief of the Name, died 1545
- Alonzo Bosco of Omey Island, pirate, fl. mid-16th century
- Grace O'Malley, pirate, c. 1530–c.1603
- William Óge Martyn, High Sheriff and Mayor of Galway, fl. 1566–1592
