= Mahon mac Turlough Mantach Ó Briain =

Mathgamain mac Toirdhealbhach Mantach Ó Briain, Chief of the Name of the Clan Teige Ó Briain of Aran, died 1565.

== Family background ==
Ó Briain was the senior member of the Mac Taidhg, or Clann Taidhg Ó Briain, of Inishmore in Galway Bay. They were descended from Tadhg Ó Briain, great-grandson of Brian Boru (c.937–1014), from whom they took their clan name. The Ó Briain Kings of Thomond had exercised rule of the three Aran Islands since before the Anglo-Irish settled in Connacht in the 1230s, and, in return for protection of their shipping to and from the town, The Tribes of Galway paid them an annual tribute of twelve tuns of wine "in consideration of their protection and expenses in guarding the bay and harbour of Galway against pirates and coast plunderers."

His full pedigree named him as the son of Turlough Mantach (the toothless) son of Donough, son of Donell, son of Turlough Meith (the fat).

== The Charter of 1545 ==
Tim Robinson points out that royal charter of 1545 determined that "Exemption from tolls for all ships entering this way made Galway, now at the peak of its prosperity, virtually a free port. The Clann Thaidhg O'Briens of Aran were no longer such important allies." This seems to have been a root cause of the dispute that led to Mahon's death. The Annals of the Four Masters record that in the year 1565:

"Mahon, the son of Turlough Mantach ... was treacherously slain in his own town of Aircín, in Aran, by his own associates and relations. When the chief men of Galway heard of this, they set out to revenge this misdeed upon the treacherous perpetrators, so that they compelled them to fly from their houses; and they the fugitives went into a boat, and put to sea; and where they landed was in the harbour of Ross, in West Corca-Bhaiscinn. Donnell, the son of Conor O'Brien, having heard of this, he hastened to meet them with all the speed that he could exert; and he made prisoners of the greater number of them, and carried them in close fetters to Magh Glae, in the upper part of Corcomroe, in order that their sorrow and anguish might be the greater for being in view of the place where they had perpetrated the crime; he hanged some of them, and burned others, according as their evil practices deserved."

== Aftermath ==
Mahon's death presaged the end of the clan's power on the island. Factional warfare broke out among the Clan Teige, and they are said to have slaughtered each other almost to a man in battle near Port Mhuirbhigh on the island, at a place later called Fearann na gCeann, "the (land) quarter of the heads", from the number of skulls still found in its soil. Within a few years, Murrough na dTuadh Ó Flaithbheartaigh became Chief of Iar Connacht, and began to assert his rule over the islands.

== Battle of Port Mhuirbhigh ==
In 1987, Tim Robinson wrote that:

"Murchadh and the main body of his followers are said to have landed at Port Mhuirbhigh and driven the O'Briens eastwards, while a smaller party came ashore near Mainistir of Cill Rónáin and attacked them in the rear. The O'Briens were routed and fled to the rocks above Cill Éinne where all but one of them, who escaped by boat or hid in a cave, were slaughtered. Their corpses were buried by the shore half a mile east of Aircín; the place is called Poll na Marbh, the hole of the dead, and bones are still turned up there."

== See also ==
- Diarmaid Mór Ó Briain of Tromra, fl. 13th/14th century
- Murrough mac Toirdelbach Ó Briain, Chief of the Name, fl. 1575–1588
- Alonzo Bosco of Omey Island, pirate, fl. mid-16th century
- Grace O'Malley, pirate, c. 1530–c.1603
- William Óge Martyn, High Sheriff and Mayor of Galway, fl. 1566–1592
