= Colmán mac Comán =

Colmán mac Comán (died 751) was Abbot of Aran, Ireland.

He was one of the few known successors of Enda of Aran, and appears to be the second such abbot listed in the Irish annals after Enda himself.

== Annalistic reference ==
From the Annals of the Four Masters:

- 751. Repose of Colmán mac Comán, in Ára.

== See also ==
- Inishmore

Preceded by Nem Moccu Birn	Abbot of Aran ?-751	Succeeded by Gaimdibhla
