= Bridget Dirrane =

- Born: Bridget Gillan; 15 November 1894; Inishmore, Aran Islands, County Galway, Ireland
- Died: 31 December 2003 (aged 109); Galway, Ireland
- Occupation: Nurse

Bridget Dirrane (15 November 1894 – 31 December 2003) was an Irish nurse, centenarian and memoirist.

== Early life ==
Bridget Dirrane was born in Oatquarter in the townland of Kilmurvey on Inishmore, Aran Islands, County Galway on 15 November 1894. She was the youngest child of Joseph Gillan and Maggie (née Walsh). Her father was a weaver of flannel cloth and had a small farm. She had four brothers and three sisters. Her oldest brother was a fisherman, who died at age 21 in 1901, and her father died before 1911. Despite this hardship, all of the children went to school, with one of her brothers becoming an Irish teacher, and later an Irish inspector. The family spoke Irish at home, but they were all bilingual with English. Dirrane was schooled at the national school in Oatquarter until the age of 14. She left to work in local homes, looking after children. When she wrote her memoirs late in life, Dirrane claimed to have met Joseph Plunkett, Éamonn Ceannt, Thomas MacDonagh, Thomas Ashe and Patrick Pearse when they visited the island, visiting a house where she looked after the children, discussing politics and plans for the Easter Rising with them. She was a republican, becoming a member of Cumann na mBan in 1918 while she was working for Fr Matthew Ryan as a housekeeper. She was involved in drilling and assisting fugitives from the authorities. Because of their known republican sympathies, the Black and Tans raided the Gillan family homes.

== Career ==
Dirrane moved to Dublin in 1919 to train in St Ultan's Hospital as a nurse. She was still under surveillance, being arrested alongside her employer Claude Chavasse when she was working as a nurse in his house. She was held in Dublin Bridewell for two days before being transferred to Mountjoy. In the time of her imprisonment, she was not charged or put on trial. Her refusal to speak English angered the guards, culminating in her going on hunger strike for a number of days in 1920 until she was released. She took part in the Cumann na mBan vigil outside of Mountjoy in November 1920, when Kevin Barry was hanged.

She worked in Richard Mulcahy's house for two years, before emigrating to the United States in 1927 to continue her career as a nurse. She worked in Boston where she was an active member of the Irish emigrant community alongside former neighbours from the Aran Islands and some relatives. She worked in a hotel for a time, but returned to nursing after her marriage to Edward 'Ned' Dirrane in November 1932 in the Jamaica Plain section of Boston. Ned was a labourer in Boston, was also from Inishmore, died from heart failure in 1940. Dirrane continued her career nursing in hospitals and as a district nurse. On 13 May 1940, she naturalised as US citizen. During World War II, she worked as a nurse in a munitions factory, and at a US Army Air Forces bomber base in Mississippi. She canvassed for John F. Kennedy in the Irish community in South Boston when he ran for president in 1960. Jean Kennedy Smith visited Dirrane in 1997 in Galway to acknowledge her contribution. Dirrane also met Senator Edward Kennedy.

== Later life ==
Following her retirement, Dirrane lived with her nephew, but she returned to the Aran Islands in 1966 at age 72. There she lived with her brother-in-law, Pat Dirrane, a widower with three grown sons. They married in a private ceremony on 27 April 1966. She continued to live on the island after Pat's death on 28 February 1990, living with her stepson. She eventually moved into a nursing home in Newcastle in the suburbs of Galway. When she celebrated her 100 birthday, she funded a statue of Our Lady Mary at a holy well in Corough on Inishmore. At age 103, the matron of Dirrane's nursing home arranged for a local writer Jack Mahon to record Dirrane's memories and collate them into a book. The book, A woman of Aran, was published in 1997 and was a bestseller for several weeks. Dirrane was awarded an honorary degree, an MA honoris causa, from NUI Galway in May 1998, the oldest person to ever receive one. The Ring of Aran®, designed by Thomas Taaffe Brady, was inspired by Bridget's life. The first ring ever made was presented to Bridget by the Mayor of Galway on January 1, 2000, to mark the Millennium Year. Dirrane died on 31 December 2003, aged 109, in Galway. She was buried on Inishmore.
