= James Lynch (fitz Ambrose) =

Irish mayor (c.1574–c.1591)

James Lynch (fitz Ambrose) (fl.1574–1591) was Mayor of Galway from 1590 to 1591.

Lynch was a member of The Tribes of Galway. He appears to have been the first merchant of Galway with an ownership claim to the Aran Islands, becoming involved with a dispute concerning the town's Corporation's customs to the then owners, the Clan Tiege of Aran, and subsequent ownership issues with Murrough na dTuadh Ó Flaithbheartaigh, Lord of Iar Connacht (fl. 1569–1593). Murrough mac Toirdelbach Ó Briain, Chief of the Name, (fl. 1575–1588) made an agreement with Lynch in June that if the Clan Teige should become extinct, he "should be their sole heir and possess Aron and their whole islands."

They eventually passed into the ownership of his son, Sir Henry Lynch.

Lynch was elected Mayor of Galway in summer of 1590. In that year, a belfry was erected in the town's St. Nicholas' Collegiate Church, his name been inscribed upon one of the bells. Just before he left office on 23 August 1591, he wrote a letter to Sir Richard Bingham, then Governor of Connacht, complaining that because the use of French ships had been banned by the government, the wealth of the town was in severe decline.

== Note ==
His appellation, fitz Ambrose, indicated his father, and was not a surname.

Civic offices
Preceded by Richard Browne	Mayor of Galway; 1590–1591	Succeeded by Ulick Lynch fitz Edmond
