= Egnech =

Egnech (died 915) was an Abbot of Aran. He was one of the few attested successors of Enda of Aran, and only the second named as such since the saint's death in 530. His death is recorded laconically in the Irish annals, without details. Viking activity occurred in the Galway Bay and Connemara region in these years but cannot be linked to Egnech's death.

In his obituary, Egnech is recorded as being both a "bishop and anchorite."

Preceded by Gaimdibhla	Abbot of Aran ? - 915	Succeeded by Flann Ua Aedha
