= Flann Ua Aedha =

12th-century Irish abbot

Flann Ua Aedha (died 1110) was abbot of Aran.

== Biography ==
Flann Ua Aedha is one of the few named successors to Enda of Aran. He died during the fourth year of the reign of King Tairrdelbach Ua Conchobair of Connacht, and was succeeded by Maelcoluim Ua Cormacain.

Since the 18th and 19th century, the surname has been rendered as Ó hAodha, O'Hughes or Hughes, but is not to be confused with a similar Galway surname, Mac Aedha/MacHugh.

== See also ==
- Séamas Ó hAodha

Preceded by Egnech	Abbot of Aran ?-1110	Succeeded by Maelcoluim Ua Cormacain
