= Ó hAodha =

Ó hAodha is a Gaelic-Irish surname, that has commonly been Anglicised to Hayes or Hughes.

== Overview ==
Now generally anglicised as O'Hea (in County Cork), Hughes or Hayes, Ó hAodha derives from Aodh, a personal name (meaning "fire") popular at all historical times throughout the Gaelic world.

It is the surname of at least ten unrelated families found in Gaelic Ireland, such as

- Ó hAodha of Muscraighe-Luachra/the Múscraige of Sliabh Luachra, now County Cork;
- Ó hAodha of Tír Chonaill (centered at Ballyshannon, County Donegal);
- Ó hAodha of Tír Eoghain (around Ardstraw, County Tyrone;
- Ó hAodha of Ulaid (around what is now Tynan, County Armagh;
- Ó hAodha of Airgíalla (centred on what is now Farney, County Monaghan;
- Ó hAodha of Dál Fiatach in Ulaid (now south County Down;
- Ó hAodha of Muintir Murchada in what is now County Galway.

== People with the surname ==
- Flann Ua Aedha, Abbot of Aran, died 1110.
- Séamas Ó hAodha, member of the Gaelic League, fl. 1914 - 1922.
