= Fanchea =

Saint Fanchea of Rossory
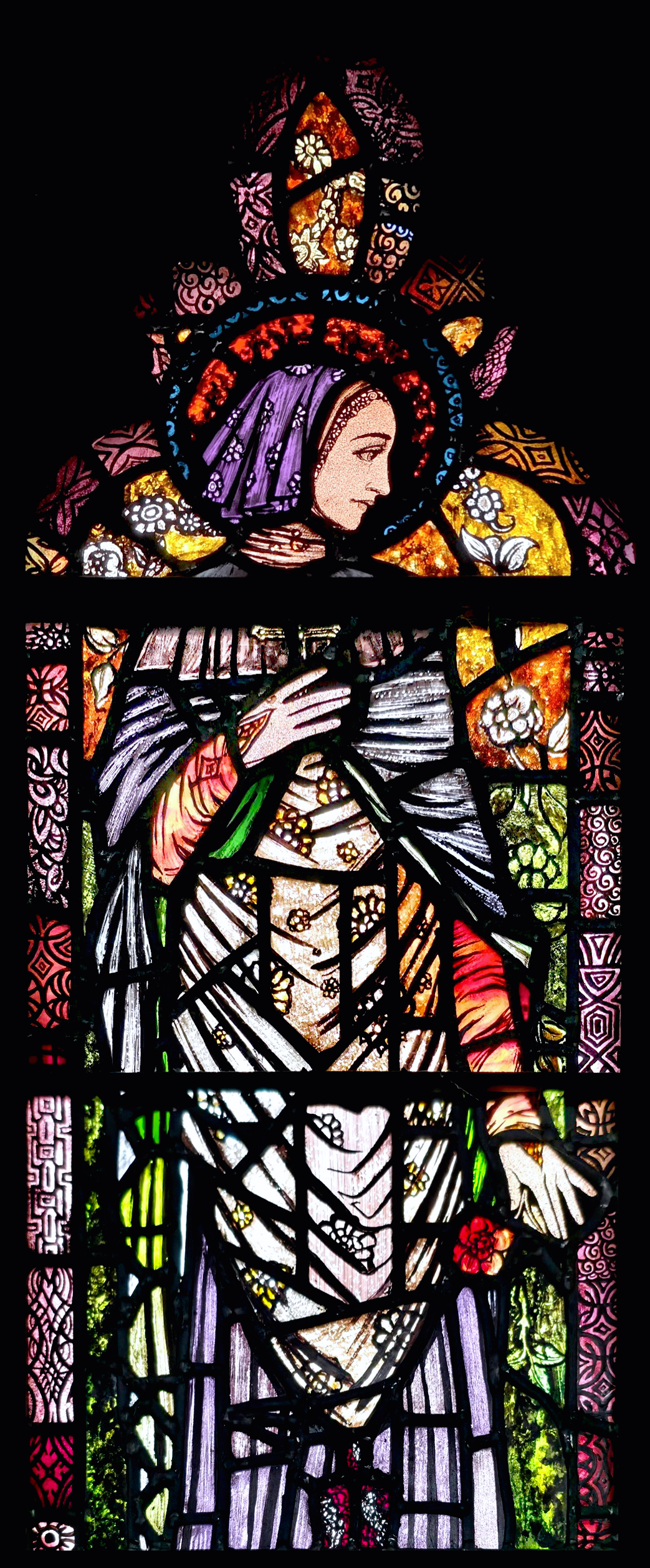
- St Fachnea by Harry Clarke at St. Joseph's Carrickmacross

Abbess
- Died: c. 585
- Venerated in: Catholic Church; Church in Wales; Eastern Orthodox Church
- Feast: 1 January

Saint Fanchea of Rossory is an Irish saint recognized by the Eastern Orthodox Church, the Church in Wales, and the Catholic Church. She was the sister of Saint Enda of Arran, whom she persuaded to become a monk. Her feast day is January 1.

== Life ==
Fanchea was one of four daughters of Conall Derg of Oriel and his wife Briga. Her sisters were St Lochinia, St Carecha, and Darenia, who married Angus of Cashel. Fanchea was born at Rathmore, near Clogher. Although Óengus mac Nad Froích wished to marry her, she resolved to become a nun. With the help of her sister Darenia, she built the Rossory Monastery on the banks of Lough Erne.

== Enda's conversion ==
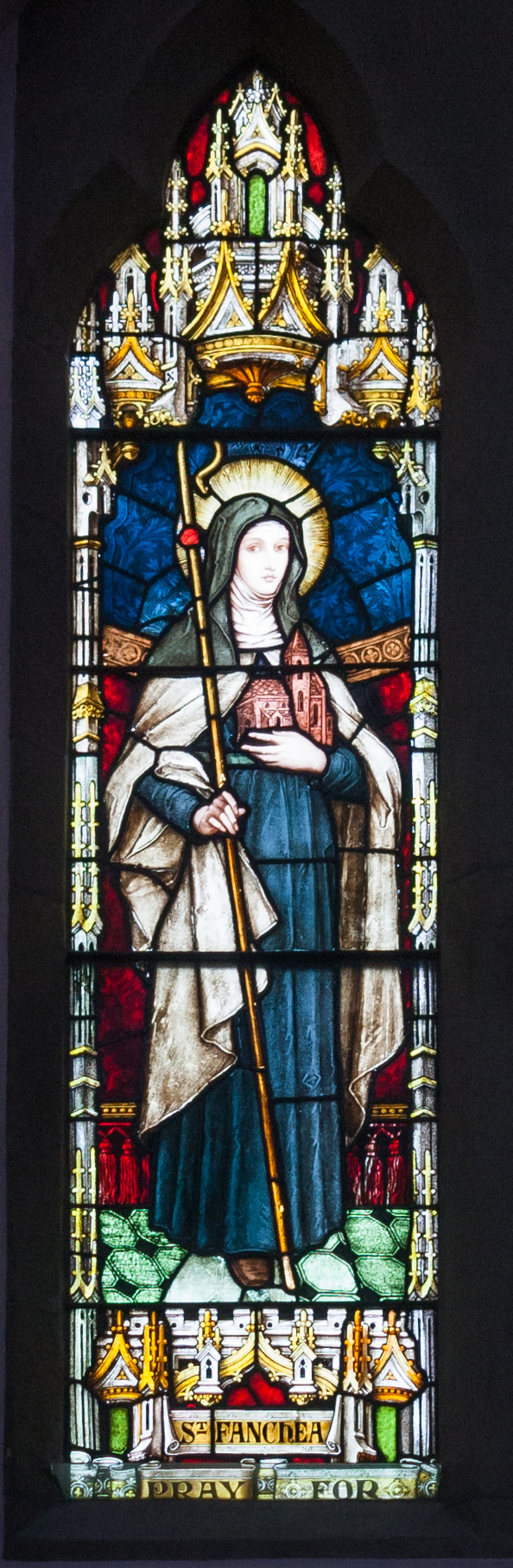
St Fanchea at St. Michael's Church Enniskillen

Fanchea is credited with the conversion of her brother Enda, a warrior prince of Oriel, who had agreed to give up his warlike ways if she would give him one of the young women at the monastery for a wife. Enda was quite shaken when Fanchea brought him to his chosen bride, who had just died. Overwhelmed with grief and Fanchea's reminder of death and judgement, Enda decided to change his ways.

According to one legend, when Enda's warrior band sought to take him back and restore him to his former place, Fanchea, by the sign of the cross, forced their feet to stick to the ground, thinking that those who desired the things of the earth should cleave to it. She only released them when they promised to do penance.

Enda remained some time under Fanchea's direction, spending his time constructing a defensive trench and wall around the monastery. On one occasion Enda was tempted to join in a nearby fight between the men of Oriel and a hostile clan. Fanchea told him to touch his head and remember where his loyalty lays. Feeling the tonsure, Enda recalled that he had given up his former way of life.

== Aran ==
When Enda was establishing his foundation on Inishmore, Fanchea, accompanied by three of her nuns, paid a visit to Aran to see how the good work was proceeding. She was much edified by the praying, and fasting, and laboring, and building, and the copying of Latin gospels and missals, all in progress. When she was departing, she would not allow her brother to withdraw a couple of his monks from their labors to row them across to the mainland. "We will," said she, "trust to God for a passage." Coming to the shore, she made the sign of the cross on the water, and spread her cloak on it. The garment at once assumed the qualities of a stout board, and the sisters, each taking her position at a corner, went tranquilly over the rough waters of the bay.

Fanchea died c. 585 of natural causes and is buried at Killane, Ireland. Her feast has been kept in the parish church of Rosairthir, in the diocese of Clogher, in Ulster; and at Kilhaine near Mount Bregh, on the borders of Meath, where her relics have been in veneration. She is commemorated on January 1.
