= Nem Moccu Birn =

Irish Christian abbot and saint (7th century)

Saint Nem Moccu Birn
- Born: Ireland
- Died: 7th century Aran Islands
- Canonized: Pre-congregation
- Feast: 14 June

Nem Moccu Birn (or Nennus, Nenus, Nehemias; died 14 June 654) was Abbot of Aran. His feast day is 14 June.

== Biography ==
Nem was one of the few known successors of Enda of Aran, and appears to be the first such abbot listed in the Irish annals after Enda himself.

The word moccu is actually a contracted form of "mac Ua Birn", indicating that St. Nem was a descendant of Loegaire Birn Buadach, and early king of Ossory and thus a scion of the Dál Birn lineage of Ossory. In the Félire Óengusso, he is recorded as being a relation of St. Ciarán of Saigir.

== Annalistic references ==
From the Annals of the Four Masters:

- M654.2. St Nem Mac Ua Birn, successor of Enne, of Ara, died on the 14th of June.

From the Félire Óengusso ("The Martyrology of Óengus"):

- "14. Nem, i.e. a pope who is in Aran, and he is a successor of Enda of Aran, and of the Dál Birn of Ossory he is, and a brother of Ciarán of Saiger.

Nem great-grandson of Bern. He was called by three names, to wit, Nem and Pupu and Cáilbe. Nem primum nomen etc. Whence Senan of Inis Cathaig sang Abbas almus amabilis etc.

A successor of Peter and Paul, Cailbe came from the east from Rome, Nem, great-grandson of Bern, a bright brother, whose name is Pupu of Aran."

== Monks of Ramsgate account ==
The monks of St Augustine's Abbey, Ramsgate wrote in their Book of Saints (1921),

Nennus (Nenus, Nehemias) (St.) Abbot. (June 14)
(7th cent. An Irish Saint, the successor of Saint Eudeus in the government of the monasteries of the Isles of Arran and Bute.

== Butler's account ==
The hagiographer Alban Butler (1710–1773) wrote in his Lives of the Fathers, Martyrs, and Other Principal Saints under June 14,

St. Nennus or Nehemias, Abbot Was of the family of the O'Birns. In 654 he succeeded St. Endeus upon his demise in the government of the great monastery of the isles of Arran, which formerly were two, before the name of Bute was given to one of them. The festival of St. Nennus has been always kept with great solemnity in many parts of Ireland. See Colgan in MSS. ad 14 Jun.

Preceded by Enda of Aran	Abbot of Aran ?-654	Succeeded by Colmán mac Comán

== See also ==
- Inishmore

== Sources ==
- Butler, Alban (1833), The Lives of the Fathers, Martyrs, and Other Principal Saints: In Two Volumes, vol. 1, Dublin: Richard Coyne This article incorporates text from this source, which is in the public domain.
- St. Augustine's Abbey, Ramsgate (1921), The Book of saints : a dictionary of servants of God canonized by the Catholic Church, London: A. & C. Black, ltd. This article incorporates text from this source, which is in the public domain.
