= Gaimdibhla =

Gaimdibhla (died 755) was Abbot of Aran.

Gaimdibhla is one of the few attested successors of Enda of Aran. Nothing is known of Gaimdibhla's life or background.

Preceded by Colmán mac Comán	Abbot of Aran; 751-755	Succeeded by Egnech
