= Alonzo Bosco =

Barbary corsair or Spanish pirate

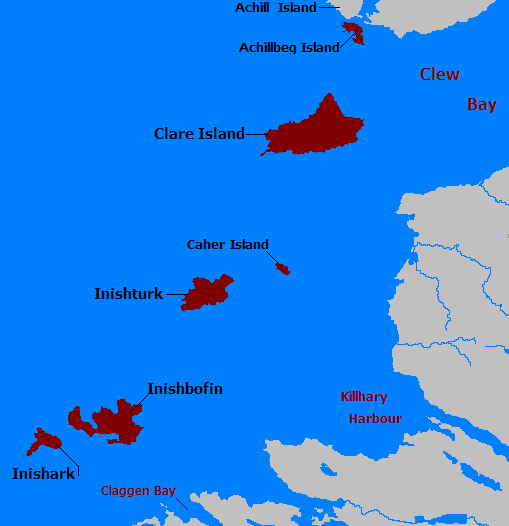
Islands off County Mayo-County Galway

Don Alonzo Bosco was a 16th-century Barbary corsair or Spanish pirate who, according to the oral tradition of Inishbofin, Galway, settled on the island in the 16th century and built a castle where a Cromwellian-era ruined castle now stands. From there, he raided the mainland and passing ships.

He became an ally of Grace O'Malley. Together they prevented unwanted intruders from entering the surrounding waters, or they used the natural harbour as a trap to attack and loot those ships with valuable cargo on board. They succeeded by stretching a chain boom across the harbour entrance from the castle at the harbour to Scealp na gCat at the opposite end.

His ultimate fate is unknown.

== Sources ==
- A Guide to Connemara's Early Christian Sites, Anthony Previté, Oughterard, 2008. ISBN 978 0 9560062 0 2
