= Killeaney =

Killeany was an Irish monastery.

In the 5th century inishmore was given by Aengus, King of Cashel, to St. Endeus or St. Enda of Aran, who founded several monasteries, and built several churches, of which the principal was named after him Kill-Enda, now called Killeany.

Thereafter (about 484) he begged his brother in law, the King Oengus of Munster, to let him go to the wild and barren isle of Innish in Galway Bay. Oengus wanted to give him a fertile plot in the Golden Vale, but Innish suited Enda's ideal for religious life. On Innish he established the monastery of Enda, which is regarded as the first Irish monastery in the strict sense. There they lived a hard life of manual labor, prayer, fasting, and study of the Scriptures. It is said that no fire was ever allowed to warm the cold stone cells even if "cold could be felt by those hearts so glowing with love of God."

Enda divided the island into 8 parts, in each of which he built a "place of refuge", and under his rule the abbey of St. Enda became a burning light of sanctity for centuries in Western Europe. Cattle, goats, and horses now huddle and shiver in the storm under many of the ruins of old walls where once men lived and prayed. Most survive as coastal ruined towers. These structures were the chosen home of a group of poor and devoted men under Saint Enda. He taught them to love the hard rock, the dripping cave, and the barren earth swept by the western gales. They were "men of the caves", and "also men of the Cross", who, remembering that their Lord was born in a manger and had nowhere to lay His head, followed the same hard way.

Enda's fame spread far and wide. Enda's disciples were a noble band. There was Saint Ciarán of Clonmacnoise, who came there first as a youth to grind corn, and would have remained there for life but for Enda's insistence that his true work lay elsewhere, reluctant though he was to part with him. When he departed, the monks of Enda lined the shore as he knelt for the last time to receive Enda's blessing, and watched with wistful eyes the boat that bore him from them. In his going, they declared, their island had lost its flower and strength.

Another was Saint Finnian, who left St Enda and founded the monastery of Moville (where Saint Columba spent part of his youth) and who afterwards became bishop of Lucca in Tuscany, Italy. Among them also was Saint Brendan the Voyager, Saint Columba of Iona, Jarlath of Tuam, and Carthach the Elder. These and many others formed a great and valiant company who first learned in St Enda the many ways of God, and who from that rocky sanctuary carried the light of the Gospel into a pagan world.

In 546 it was agreed between the kings of Munster and Connacht, whose territories were separated by Galway Bay, that these islands should be independent of both, and pay tribute to neither. In 1081 the Great Island was ravaged by the Danes. The sept of Mac Tiege O'Brien were temporal lords of the islands from a very remote period, and the inhabitants of the English part of the town of Galway entered early into strict alliance and friendship with them; but this compact did not save the islands from being plundered and burnt by Sir John D'Arcy, Lord Justice of Ireland, who, in 1334, sailed round the western coast with a fleet of 56 vessels.
