= Enda of Aran =

Irish monastic

Saint Enda of Aran
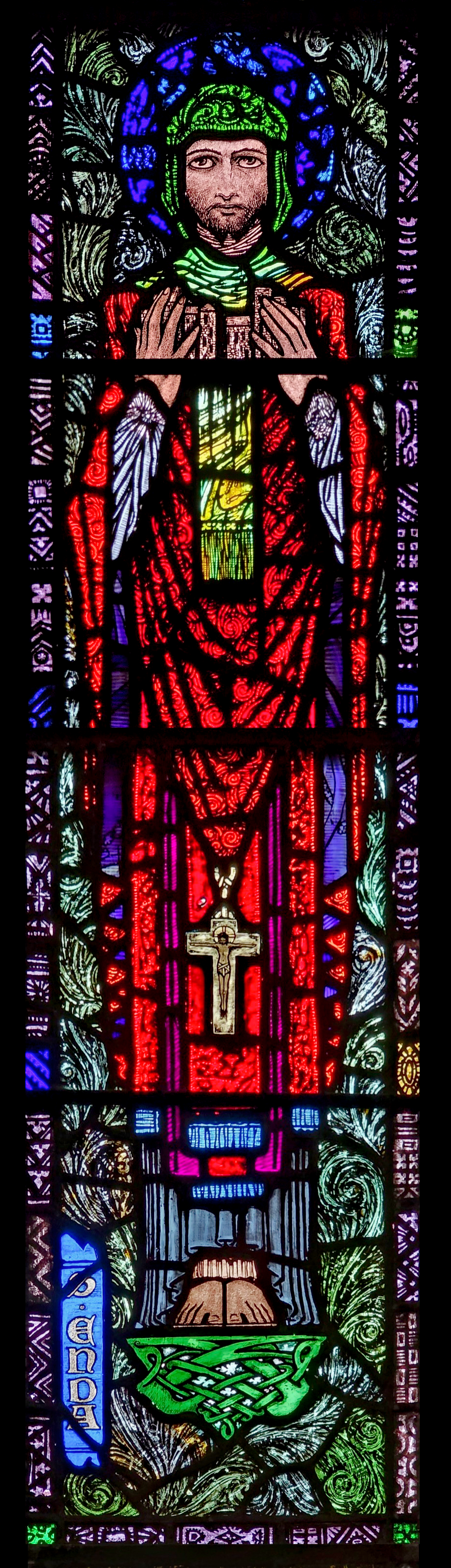
- St. Enda by Harry Clarke

Abbot of Aran
- Born: c. 450; Meath, Ireland
- Died: c. 530; Killeaney, Inis Mór, Galway, Ireland
- Venerated in: Roman Catholic Church; Eastern Orthodox Church
- Feast: 21 March

Saint Enda of Aran (Éanna, Éinne or Endeus, died c. 530 AD) is an Irish saint. His feast day is 21 March.

Enda was a warrior-king of Oriel in Ulster, converted by his sister, Saint Fanchea, an abbess. About 484 he established the first Irish monastery at Killeaney on Inis Mór. St Enda is described as the "patriarch of Irish monasticism". Most of the great Irish saints had some connection with Aran.

== Early life and conversion ==
According to the Martyrdom of Oengus, Enda was an Irish prince, son of Conall Derg of Oriel (Ergall) in Ulster. Legend has it that when his father died, he succeeded him as king and went off to fight his enemies. The soldier Enda was converted by his sister, Saint Fanchea, an abbess. He visited Fanchea, who tried to persuade him to lay down his arms. He agreed, if only she would give him a young girl in the convent for a wife. He renounced his dreams of conquest and decided to marry. The girl she promised turned out to have just died, and Fanchea forced him to view the girl's corpse, to teach him that he, too, would face death and judgment.

Faced with the reality of death, and by his sister's persuasion, Enda decided to study for the priesthood, and studied first at St Ailbe's monastery at Emly. Fanchea sent him to Rosnat, a great center of monasticism. There he took monastic vows and was ordained. The stories told of the early life of Saint Enda and his sister are unhistorical. More authentic vitae survive at Tighlaghearny at Inishmore, where he was buried.

=== The monastic school of Aran ===
Inishmore – Aran Islands

It is said that Enda learned the principles of monastic life at Rosnat in Britain. Returning to Ireland, Enda built a church at Drogheda. About 484 he was given land in the Aran Islands by his brother-in-law, Aengus, King of Munster.

Three limestone islands make up the Aran Islands: Inishmore, Inishmaan and Inisheer (respectively, the Great, Central and Eastern Island). The three islands of Aran stretch across the mouth of Galway Bay, forming a natural breakwater against the Atlantic Ocean. The largest of the three, Inishmore, is about nine miles long. In many places it is quite barren. Geologically, the islands are an extension of the Burren in Clare, on the mainland to the southeast: an uplifted limestone block, striated by gashes ranging from inches to hundreds of feet deep. Water percolates right through the stone, leading sometimes to water shortages and preventing the formation of the typically boggy western Irish land form. Peat for fires had to be imported from Galway. The resulting flora are unique; Mediterranean and Alpine species meet here, attracting masses of tiny multicoloured butterflies.

Enda's monks imitated the asceticism and simplicity of the earliest Egyptian desert hermits. He established the monastery of Enda, which is regarded as the first Irish monastery, at Killeany on Inismór. [This is not compatible with Enda's having studied for the priesthood at the monastery at Emly, Co Tipperary, above.] He also established a monastery in the Boyne valley, and several others across the island, and along with Finnian of Clonard is known as the father of Irish monasticism. At Killeaney the monks lived a hard life of manual labour, prayer, fasting, and study of the Scriptures. The monks of Aran lived alone in their stone cells, slept on the ground, ate together in silence, and survived by farming and fishing.

Enda divided the island into two parts, one half assigned to the monastery of Killeany, and the western half to such of his disciples as chose "to erect permanent religious houses on the island". Later he divided the island into 8 parts, in each of which he built a "place of refuge". The life of Enda and his monks was frugal and austere. The day was divided into fixed periods for prayer, labour, and sacred study. Each community had its own church and its village of stone cells, in which they slept either on the bare ground or on a bundle of straw covered with a rug, but always in the clothes worn by day. They assembled for their daily devotions in the church or oratory of the saint under whose immediate care they were placed. The monks took their meals in silence in a common refectory, from a common kitchen, having no fires in their cloghauns or stone cells, however cold the weather or wild the seas.

They invariably carried out the monastic rule of procuring their own food and clothing by the labour of their hands. Some fished around the islands; others cultivated patches of oats or barley in sheltered spots between the rocks. Others ground grain or kneaded the meal into bread, and baked it for the use of the brethren. They spun and wove their own garments from the undyed wool of their own sheep. They could grow no fruit in these storm-swept islands; they drank neither wine nor mead, and they had no flesh meat, except perhaps a little for the sick. St Enda himself died in old age around the year 530.

Enda's monastery flourished until Viking times, but much of the stone was ransacked by Cromwell's men in the 1650s for fortifications, so only scattered ruins remain. Most survive as coastal ruined towers. Cattle, goats, and horses now huddle and shiver in the storm under many of the ruins of old walls where once men lived and prayed. These structures were the chosen home of a group of poor and devoted men under Saint Enda. He taught them to love the hard rock, the dripping cave, and the barren earth swept by the western gales. They were "men of the caves", and "also men of the Cross".

=== Enda and St Brecan ===
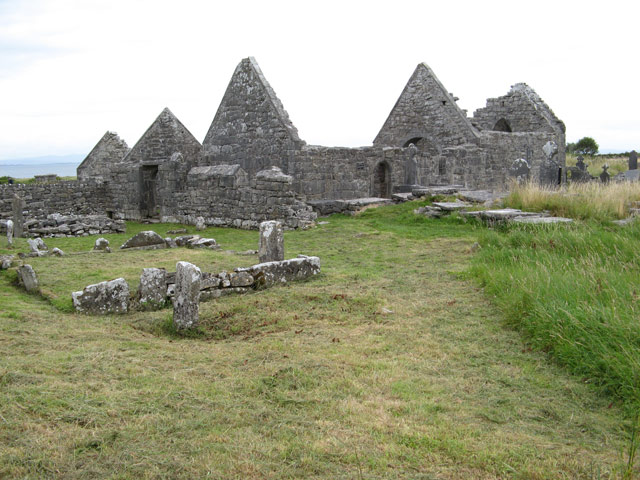
Teampall Brecan – Inis Mór

One tale tells that Saint Brecan was not happy with Enda's land division so Enda and Brecan made an agreement. Each say mass at his own monastery on either end of the island, and when they finished they would begin walking towards the centre. Wherever they met, that's where they'd divide the land. But Brecan began saying mass earlier than the agreed time. Enda prayed for divine intervention. Brecan's feet became stuck in the sand at the beach of Kilmurvey, and Enda wound up getting most of the land.

=== Enda and Corban ===
Corbanus, who was still a heathen, and a churl to boot, vacated the isle, and conveyed his people and their property to the opposite coast. There he met St Enda and his monks preparing to cross in their slender currachs, and seemingly ill provided with food and furniture. There were several sacks and casks of corn and meal on the shore belonging to Corbanus, and as the boats were putting off he joked to the saint, "Here are some barrels and sacks of good corn which I would gladly give to save you and these poor men with the shorn heads, from starvation, but your wretched boats could not bear their weight across." "Do not mind that," said the saint; "let the gift be from your heart—that is the main thing." "Surely!" said the other, "I make a free offer!" At the word, sacks and barrels, with much bustle, shot forward over the boats and over the men in them, and in a direct line to the eastern landing-place of Inishmore.

== Influence on early Gaelic Church ==
During his own lifetime, Enda's monastic settlement on the Aran islands became an important pilgrimage destination, as well as a centre for the evangelisation of surrounding areas. At least two dozen canonised individuals had some association with "Aran of the Saints". Among these were Saint Brendan the Voyager, who was blessed for his voyage there; Jarlath of Tuam, Finnian of Clonard, and Saint Columba of Iona who called it the "Sun of the West". Aran became a miniature Mount Athos, with a dozen monasteries scattered over the island, the most famous, Killeany, where Enda himself lived. There, a great tradition of austerity, holiness, and learning was begun.

Saint Ciaran of Clonmacnoise came there first as a youth to grind corn, and would have remained there for life but for Enda's insistence that his true work lay elsewhere, reluctant though he was to part with him. When he departed, the monks of Enda lined the shore as he knelt for the last time to receive Enda's blessing, and watched as the boat bore him from them. Saint Finnian left St Enda and founded the monastery of Moville (where Columba spent part of his youth) and who afterwards became bishop of Lucca in Tuscany, Italy. Among those who spent time with Enda was Carthach the Elder. Ciarán is said to have walked to Clonmacnoise with his pet cow, which was a particularly good milker; long after her death in great old age the Book of the Dun Cow was bound in her skin.

== St Enda's well ==
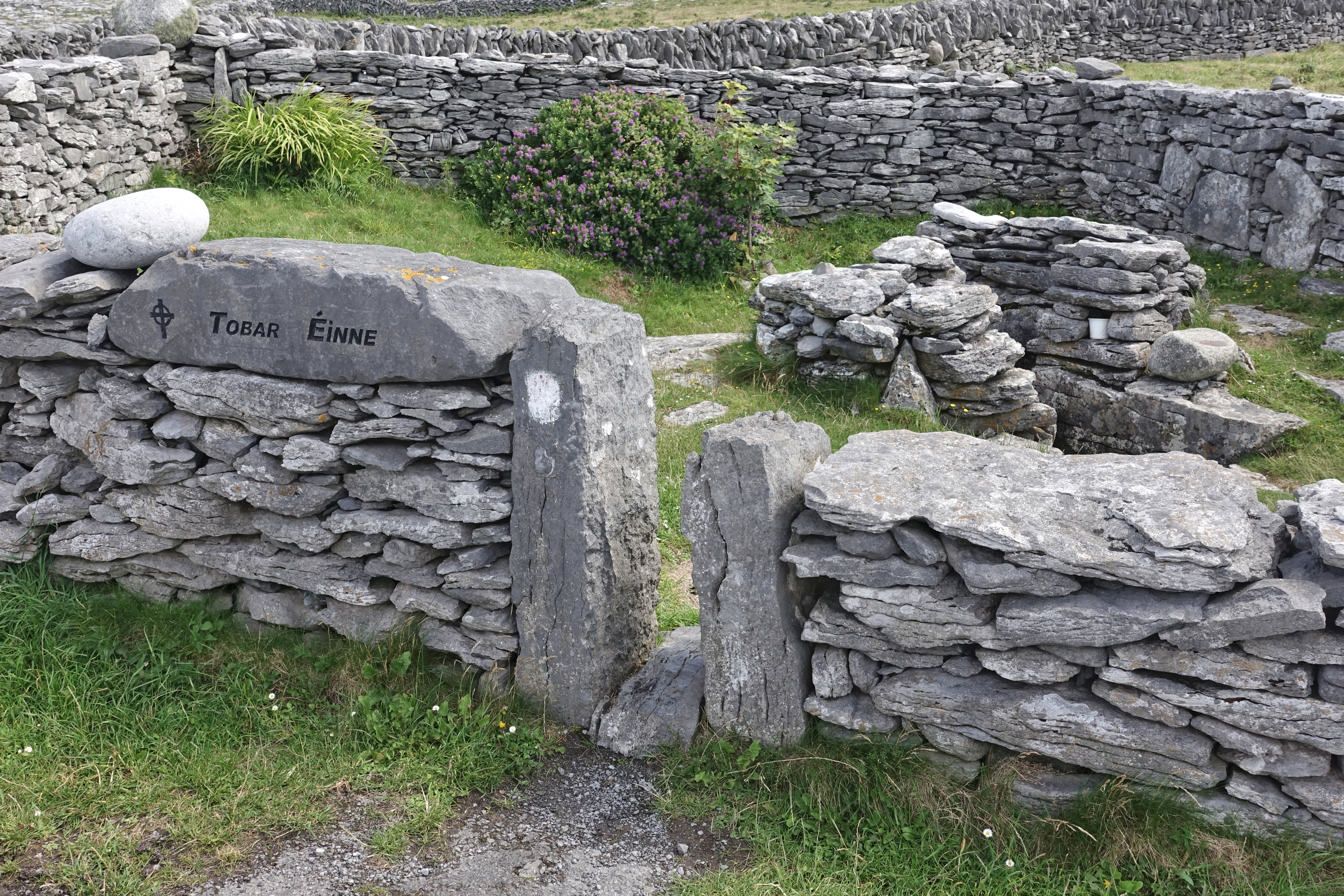
Tobar Éinne (Tobar Éanna), Saint Enda's holy well on Inis Oírr

=== Barna, County Galway ===
This holy well is situated on the approach road to Silver Strand close to the village of Barna in County Galway, about 5 kilometres from Galway city. It is reputed to have been the resting place of St Enda of Aran on his way to the Aran islands. Local tradition has it that St Enda used it to spend the night here on his way to the islands and that one day a well sprung up as he prayed. Through the years pilgrimages were made regularly to the well.

=== Inis Oirr ===
Tobar Éinne (or Tobar Éanna) is located near the west coast of Inis Oírr. Locals still carry out a ceremony (or pilgrimage) called Turas to the Well of Enda. It is said that the well has healing powers and that it never runs dry.

== Saint Brendan's stone ==
When Saint Brendan returned from his travels far to the West he thanked God at the Abbey and laid down the only gift he brought back from his travels, a stone with an eye carved on one end and a rune on the other. It was given to him by a dwarf. This stone was said to float if placed on water and the gem pointed to the Last Isle of the West. The rune is a variant of the Norse Reith rune which resembles the letter 'r'. This is called the "Styrimathr" (STEE-ri-mah-thur) meaning in Norse "the Captain of the Seas path". It is carried in a small silk purse by the Abbot of the Abbey of St Enda.

Those who lived there loved the islands which "as a necklace of pearls, God has set upon the bosom of the sea", and all the more because they had been the scene of heathen worship. according to a prophecy, "there will be left only three islands altogether, when Innish is sent from mortal planes: Inishmore, Inishmaan, and Inisheer." On the largest will stand Saint Enda's well and altar, and the round tower of the church where the bell was sounded which gave the signal that Saint Enda had taken his place at the altar. At the tolling of the bell the service of the Mass began in all the churches of the island.

== Legacy ==
Patrick Pearse named his bilingual boys' school Scoil Éanna, or St Enda's School, in honour of the saint in 1908. Ballyboden has a Gaelic Athletic Association club named after him, Ballyboden St. Enda's. Omagh St Enda's Gaelic Athletic Club is also named in his honour and in 2011, members of the club paid tribute to their patron by visiting his church on the Aran Islands before 150 members of the club cycled from Galway to Omagh. Coláiste Éinde, known as St. Endas College in English, is a secondary school in Galway which is also named after him. St Enda's GAA in Glengormley County Antrim is also named for him.

== See also ==
- Conainne
- Nem Moccu Birn

| Preceded by New creation | Abbot of Aran c.484? – c.540 | Succeeded by Gaimdibhla |
