= Walls of Dubrovnik =

Series of walls built around the city of Dubrovnik, Croatia

- Dubrovačke gradske zidine
- Dubrovnik, Croatia
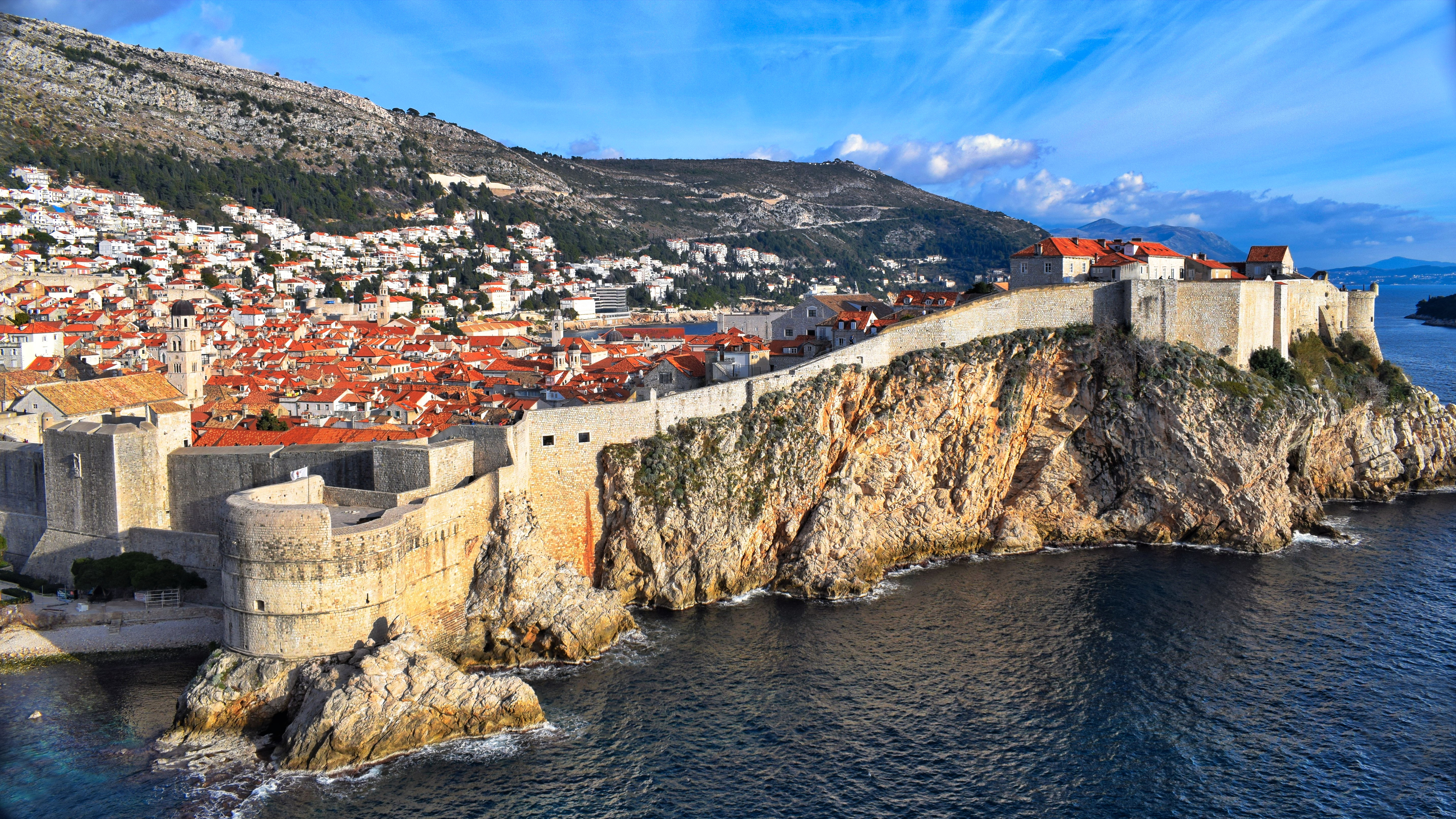
- Walls of Dubrovnik from fortress Lovrijenac

Site information
- Type: Walls
- Owner: City of Dubrovnik, Croatia
- Controlled by: Republic of Ragusa (Dubrovnik)
- Open to the public: Daily 9 am–5 pm (May-mid October until 7 pm)
- Condition: Well-preserved or intact

Location
- Location within Croatia
- Coordinates: 42.640°N 18.108°E
- Height: Up to 25 m (82 ft)

Site history
- Built: 13th century – 17th century Defined in the 14th century
- Built by: Dubrovnik citizens Architects involved: 1319 Nicifor Ranjina; 1461–1464 Michelozzo di Bartolomeo; 1465–1466 Giorgio da Sebenico (Croatian: Juraj Dalmatinac); 1466–1516 Paskoje Miličević; 1538 Antonio Ferramolino; 1617 Mihajlo Hranjac
- Materials: Limestone
- Events: Notable non-battle events: Foundation of Republic in 1358; Strong earthquake in 1667; Marshal Marmont abolished the Republic of Ragusa in 1808

The Walls of Dubrovnik (Croatian: Dubrovačke gradske zidine) are a series of defensive stone walls surrounding the city of Dubrovnik in southern Croatia. (Note: "...city's founding before the 7th century as a Byzantine castrum on a rocky island named Laus..." The 7th century recorded by Constantine Porphyrogenitus as city's founding was probably the last act of peoples movement to Ragusia settlement, hurried by Slavs migration into these areas.) Ramparts were built in the outlying areas of the city, including the mountain slopes as part of a set of statutes from 1272. The existing city walls were constructed mainly during the 13th–17th centuries. The walls run an uninterrupted course of approximately 1,940 metres (6,360 ft) in length, encircling most of the old city, and reach a maximum height of about 25 metres (82 ft).

Refugees from destroyed towns such as Epidaurus fled to what would become the defensive settlement of Dubrovnik (also known later as Ragusa) which would become a haven of refuge with the construction of its town walls. The walls were reinforced by three circular and 14 quadrangular towers, five bastions (bulwarks), two angular fortifications and the large St. John's Fortress. Land walls were additionally reinforced by one larger bastion and nine smaller semicircular ones, like the casemate Fort Bokar, the oldest preserved fort of that kind in Europe. The moat that ran around the outside section of the city walls, which were armed by more than 120 cannons, provided superb city defense capabilities.

In 1979, the old city of Dubrovnik, which includes a substantial portion of the old walls of Dubrovnik, joined the UNESCO list of World Heritage Sites. Today, the Walls of Dubrovnik are one of the most popular tourist attractions in Croatia, with more than 1.2 million visitors in 2019.

== Former city walls ==
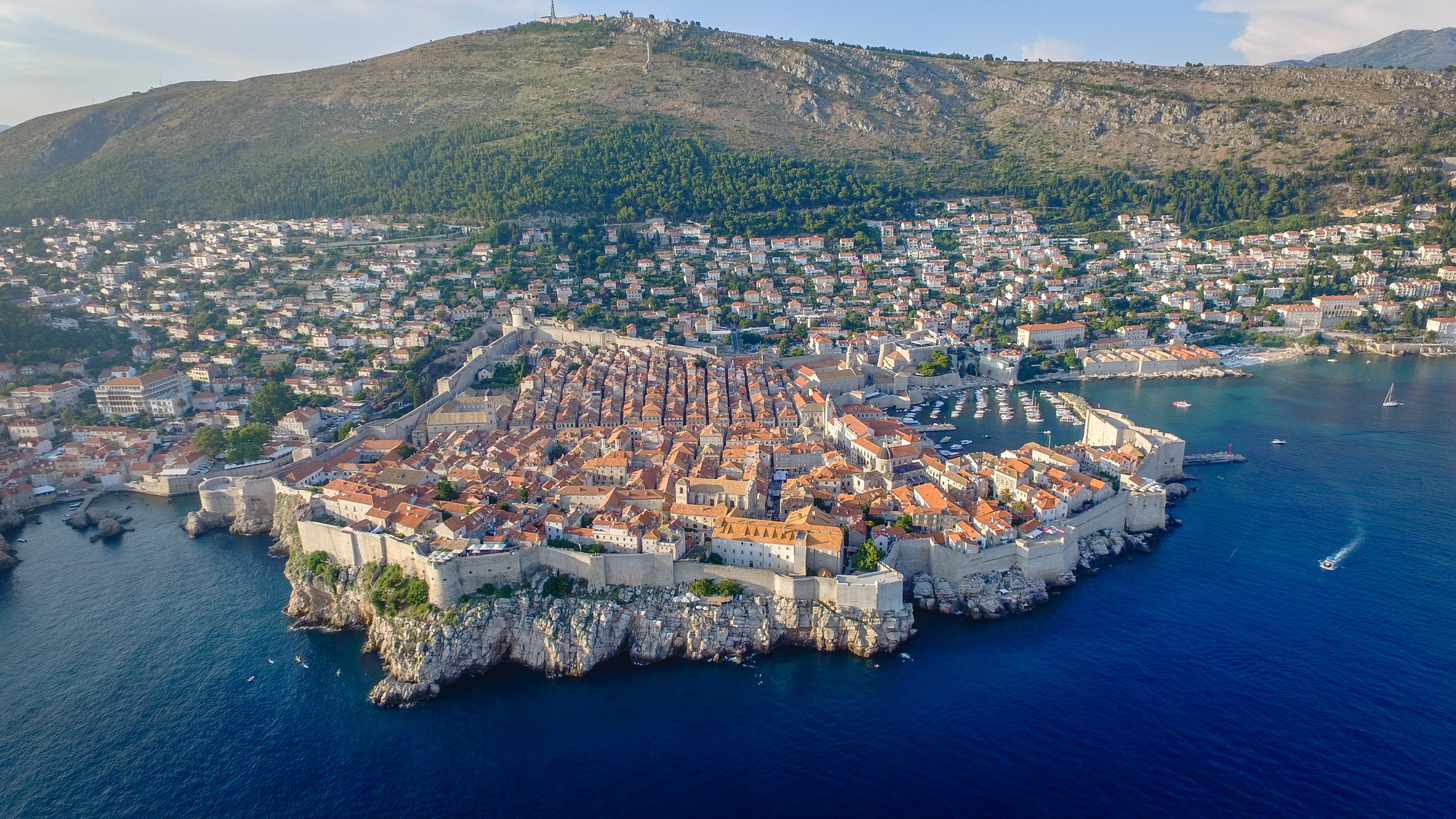
View from the South of the city walls and the city. The present shape of the walls was defined following the devastating fire of 1292.

The construction of the first limestone forts around the city began in the Early Middle Ages, towards the end of the 8th century. But, the "old chronicles" say that some sort of castle reliably existed on the Lave peninsula quite a long time prior to that.

The city first spread towards the uninhabited eastern part of the islet, which explains why the current name for the southeast part of the city, near St. John's Fortress, is called Pustijerna. The name "Pustijerna" comes from the Latin statement "post terra", which means "outside the town". In the 9th and 10th centuries, the defensive wall enclosed the eastern portion of the city. When the sea channel separating the city from mainland was filled with earth in the 11th century, the city merged with the settlement on land, and soon, a single wall was built around the area of the present-day city core.

During this same time period, Dubrovnik and the surrounding area were described as a part of the Croatian (Grwasiah) entity, in one of the works by the famous Arab geographer Muhammad al-Idrisi. In his book Nuzhat al-Mushataq fi ikhtiraq al-afaq (English: "Joy for those who wish to sail over the world") from 1154, he mentioned Dubrovnik as the southernmost city of "the country of Croatia and Dalmatia". l

== Modern-day city walls ==
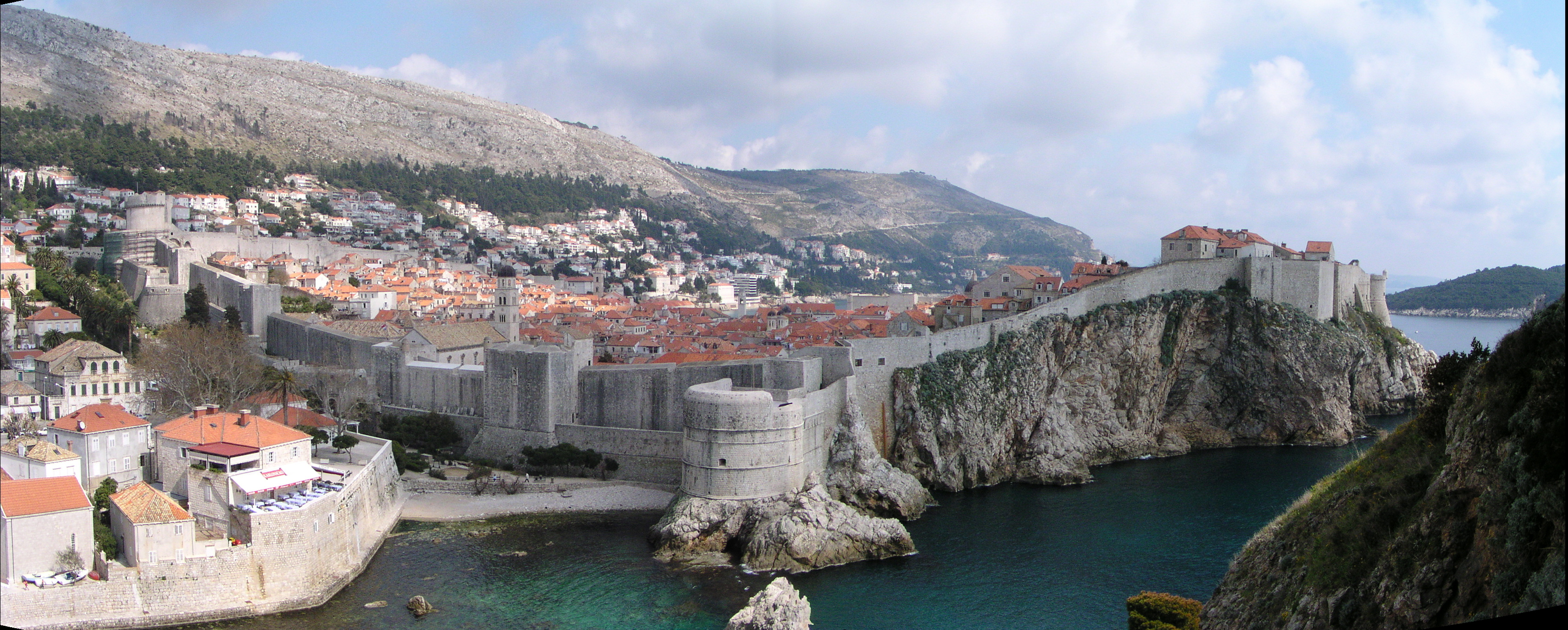
Walls around the old town of Dubrovnik

These city walls have been preserved to the present day, maintained by the combined efforts of construction workers and city folk, who rebuilt the structures as needed. Additionally, because of diplomatic refforts, the walls have managed on many occasions to avoid dangerous measures taken by enemies against the Republic of Ragusa.

The present shape of the walls was designed following a basic city plan dating back to 1292, when the port city was rebuilt following a fire, when Dubrovnik was under the Republic of Venice; the peak of construction lasted from the beginning of the 15th century until the latter half of the 16th century during the age of the independent Republic of Ragusa and it was a Renaissance work of Italian and Croatian architects and builders. Being constructed very solidly, the walls were generally unaffected by a strong earthquake occurring in 1667. The largest stimulus for continued development and emergency repairs and works of the Ragusan fortresses came as a result of the danger of unexpected attack by Turkish military forces, especially after they conquered Constantinople in 1453. The city was also under latent danger of attack by the Venetians. For centuries the people of Dubrovnik were able to preserve their city-republic by skillful maneuvering between East and West. A strategic treaty with Turkey protected Ragusa's liberty and maintained the opportunity for a major trading role between the Ottoman Empire and Europe.

The irregular parallelogram surrounding Dubrovnik consists of four strong fortresses at its most significant points. To the north is the strong circular Minčeta Tower, and to the east side of the city port is the Revelin Fortress. The western city entrance is protected by the strong and nicely-shaped Fort Bokar, and the strong, freestanding, St. Lawrence Fortress (also known as Lovrijenac), protects the western side of the city from possible land and sea assaults. The large and complex St. John Fortress is located on the southeast side of the city.

=== Land Walls ===
The main wall on the landside is 4 metres (13 ft) to 6 metres (20 ft) thick, and, at certain locations, the walls reach up to 25 meters (82 feet) in height. The land walls stretch from Fort Bokar in the west to the detached Revelin Fortress in the east. On the landside, the wall is protected with an additional range of slanted supporting walls as defense against artillery fire, especially against possible Ottoman attacks.

==== Gates ====
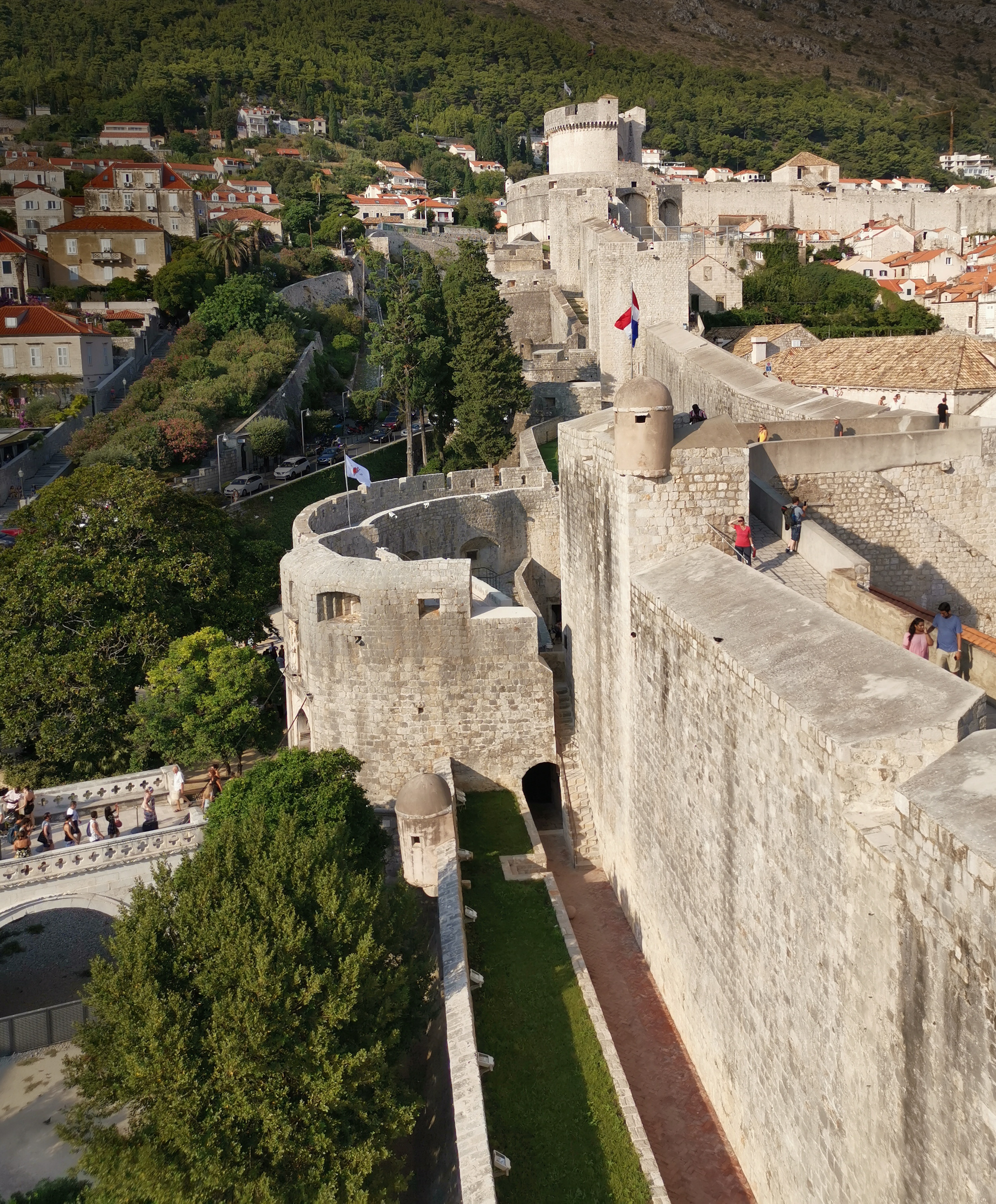
Western wall and the Gate of Pile

The town has four city gates: two that lead to the harbor and two (with drawbridges) that lead to the mainland. During the time period when the Austrian Empire controlled the city, two more gates were opened in the wall.

Communication with the outside world on the land side was maintained with the city through two main well-protected city gates, one placed on the western side of the city and the other placed on the eastern side. These entrances were constructed so that communications with the city could not be carried out directly; the messenger had to enter through multiple doors and walk down a winding passageway, which is evidence of the security measures taken as a last defense against the possibility of a surprise breach or entrance of unexpected visitors.

===== Gate of Pile =====
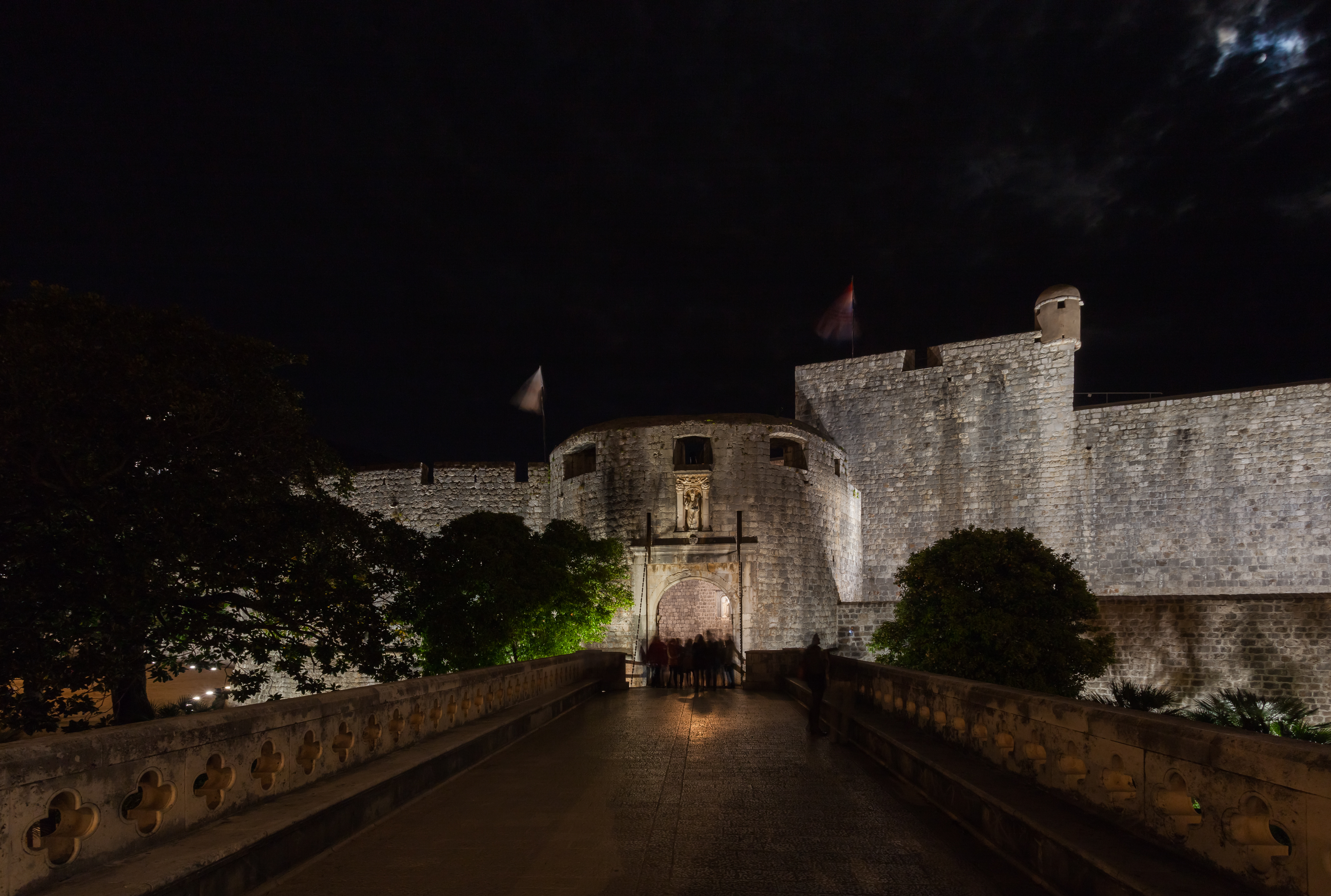
Fortified complex of the Gate of Pile

The Pile Gates are a well-fortified complex with multiple doors, defended by Fort Bokar and the moat that ran around the outside section of the city walls. At the entrance gate to the Old Town, on the western side of the land walls, there is a stone bridge between two Gothic arches, which were designed by the architect Paskoje Miličević in 1471. That bridge connects to another bridge, a wooden drawbridge which can be pulled up. During the republican era, the wooden drawbridge to the Pile Gate was hoisted each night with considerable pomp in a ceremony which delivered the city's keys to the Ragusan rector. Today, it spans a dry moat whose garden offers respite from crowds. Above the bridges, over the arch of town's principal gateway, there is a statue of city patron Saint Blaise (Croatian: Sveti Vlaho), with a model of the Renaissance city. After passing the Pile Gate's original Gothic inner gateway, it is possible to reach one of a three access points to the city walls.

===== Gate of Ploče =====
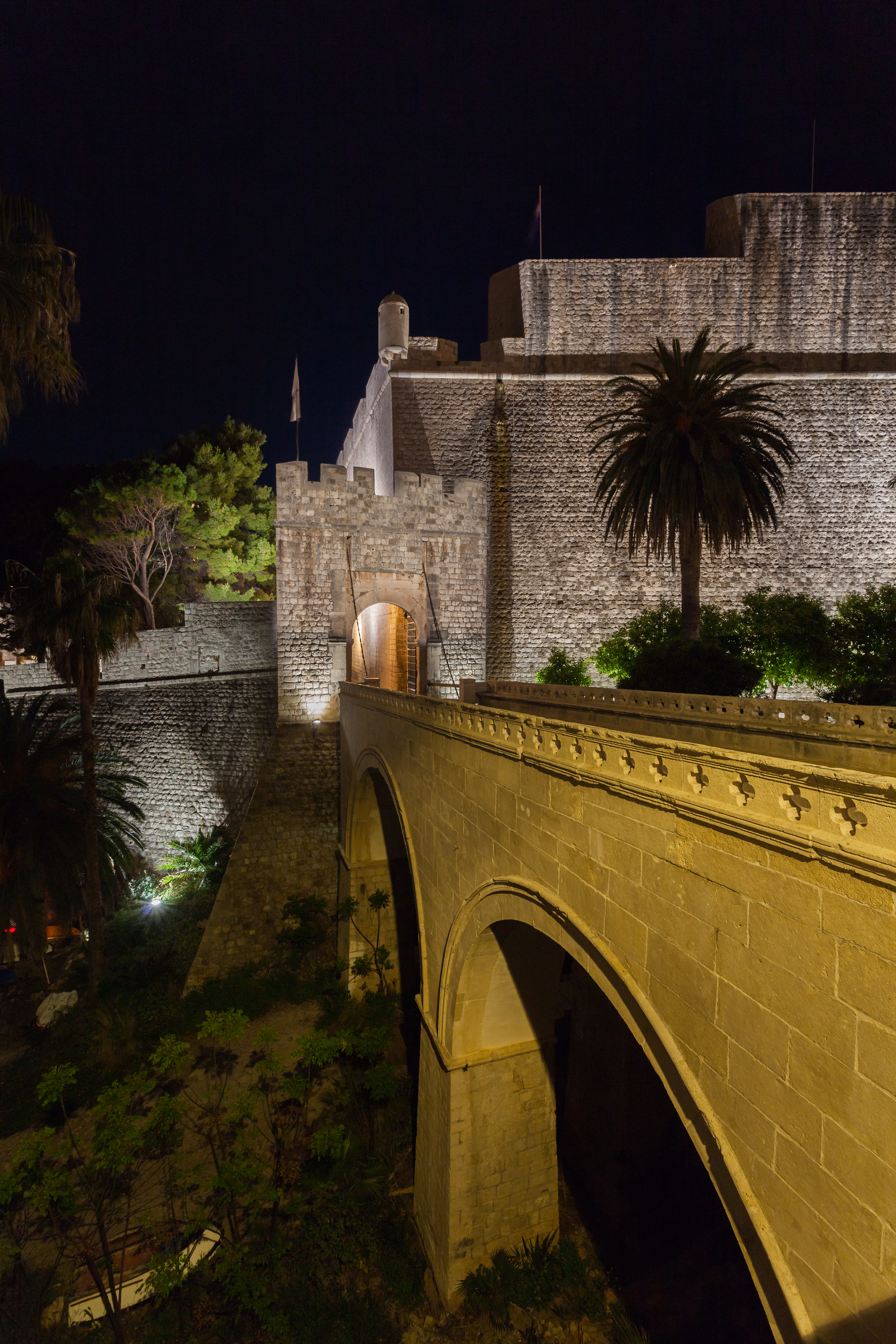
Gate of Ploče on the eastern side of the land walls, serve as the second major entrance to the city.

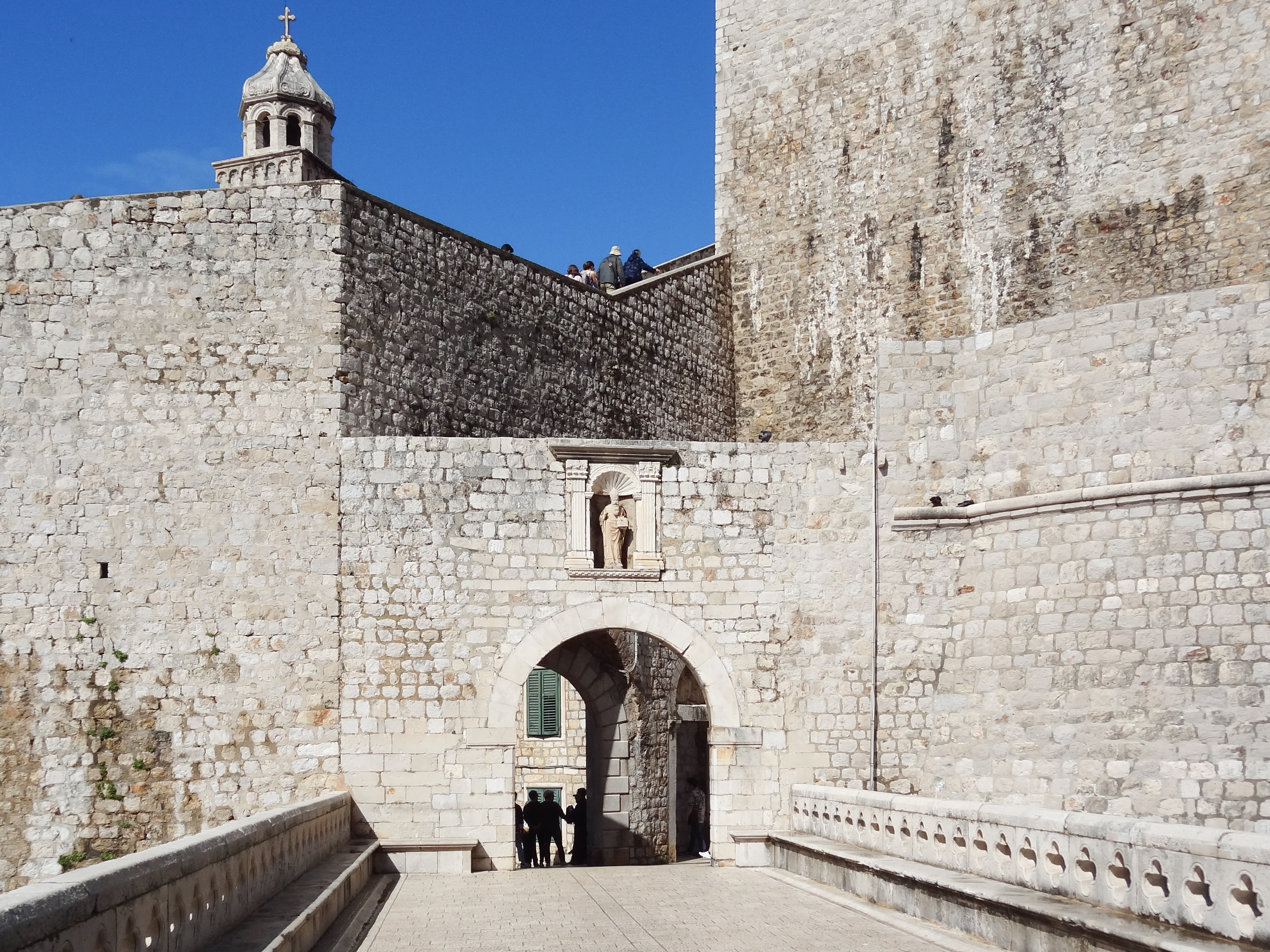
Inner part of Ploče gate

On the eastern side of the land walls stands the second major entrance to the city, the Gate of Ploče. This gate is protected by the freestanding Revelin Fortress, which are connected by a wooden drawbridge and a twin-spanned stone bridge spanning a protective ditch. The Outer Gate of Ploče was designed and constructed by architect Mihajlo Hranjac in 1628, while the two bridges to the Revelin Fortress were built in the 15th century by Paskoje Miličević. Miličević also designed the Pile Gate bridges, which explains the similarities between the bridges. Over the bridge, just like with the Gate of Pile, there is the statue of Saint Blaise, the patron saint of Dubrovnik.

===== Gate of Buža =====
The Gate of Buža (meaning "hole") is located on the northern side of the land walls. This gate is relatively new compared to the other gates, as it was constructed during the early 1900s.

=== Sea Walls ===
The main wall on the sea-facing side of Dubrovnik stretches from Fort Bokar in the west to St. John Fortress in the south, and to the Revelin Fortress on the land-side. These walls are 1.5 to 5 meters (4.9 to 16.4 ft) thick, depending on their location and its strategic importance. The purpose of these walls were to help defend the city from sea-based attacks, particularly from the Republic of Venice, which was often considered a threat to Dubrovnik's safety.

=== City Harbour ===
One of the oldest sectors of Dubrovnik was constructed around a Late Antique castle by the sea, which stretched landwards a bit more than it does today. It was constructed on the site of the Pre-Romanesque cathedral and the Rector's Palace, thus encircling the city's harbour. The harbour was designed and constructed by engineer Paskoje Miličević in the late 15th century. Notably, the harbour was noticeably painted on the palm of St. Blaise in a triptych painted by the artist Nikola Božidarević around 1500.

The most prominent portion of the harbour is the three enormous arches (the fourth original arch was walled in) of a large arsenal built in the late 12th century and enlarged in the latter part 15th century. The harbour is also the oldest shipyard within the city and is still in use today.

Porporela was built in 1873, next to St. John Fortress. The Kase jetty (Kaše Breakwater) was built in 1485, according to the design of Paskoje Miličević, in order to defend the harbour and protect it from south-eastern winds and waves. The breakwater thus shortened the harbour's bulky chain stretched in the night from the St. John Fortress to St. Luke's tower. It was constructed of huge stone blocks laid over wooden foundations without binder.

Today, the arsenal hosts the City Café and a movie theatre, whereas both the harbour and Porporela have become pleasant promenades and tourist attractions.

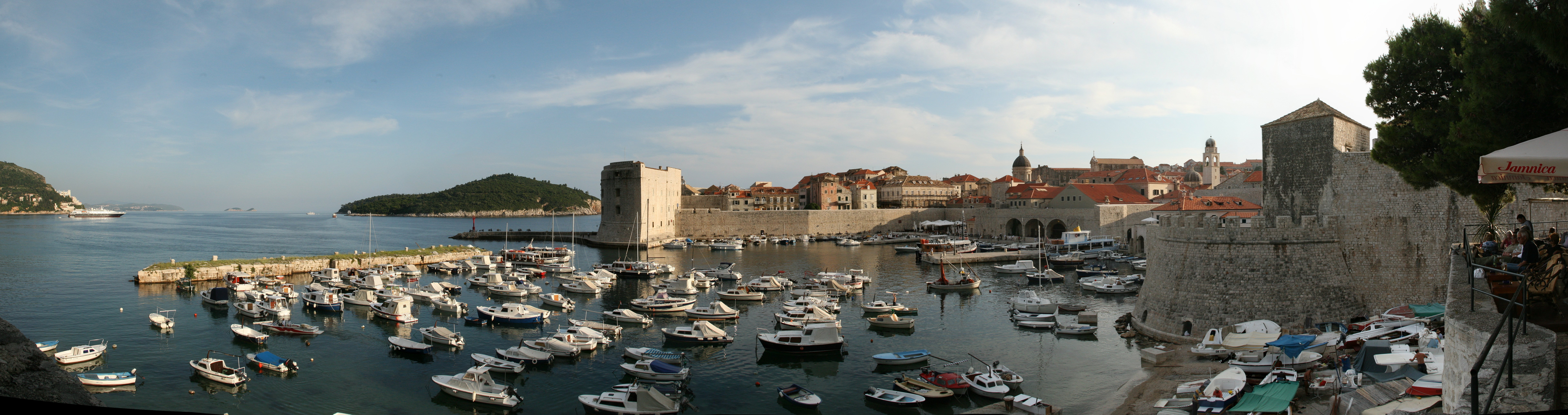
A panorama from Revelin Fortress at City Harbour

==== Gates ====
In the city port area, one of the most significant areas of the maritime trade city, there were two entrances: the Gate of Ponte (port) and the Fishmarket Gate. The entire layout of the Dubrovnik streets, as well as a range of expansions, was intended for fast and effective communication with the forts of the city walls.

===== Gate of Ponte =====
Constructed in 1476, the Gate of Ponte is situated westwards from the Great Arsenal. The city wall, built at the same period, leads from the Gate to St. John Fortress. The present-day street of Damjan Juda was formed in the 15th century when the sewage system was completed, and building houses against the western city wall was no longer allowed.

===== The Fishmarket Gate =====
The Fishmarket Gate, built in 1381, stands eastward from the Great Arsenal. The three arches of the 15th century Small Arsenal, where small boats were repaired, are situated a bit further. The old tower of St. Luke's protects the harbour in the east, and the harbour entrance is encircled and guarded by the Revelin Fortress.

== Forts ==
=== Forts within walls ===
The fall of Constantinople in 1453 to the Ottomans was a clear sign to the cautious citizens of Dubrovnik that ample defensive measures were quickly needed, the strengthening of its defensive structures the foremost of the issues. The fall of Bosnia, which followed soon in 1463, only hastened the works. As a result, the Republic invited the architect Michelozzo di Bartolomeo of Florence to direct the improvement of the city's defenses. His work in Dubrovnik resulted in the construction and expansion of numerous buildings of key importance for the defense of Dubrovnik.

==== Minčeta Tower ====
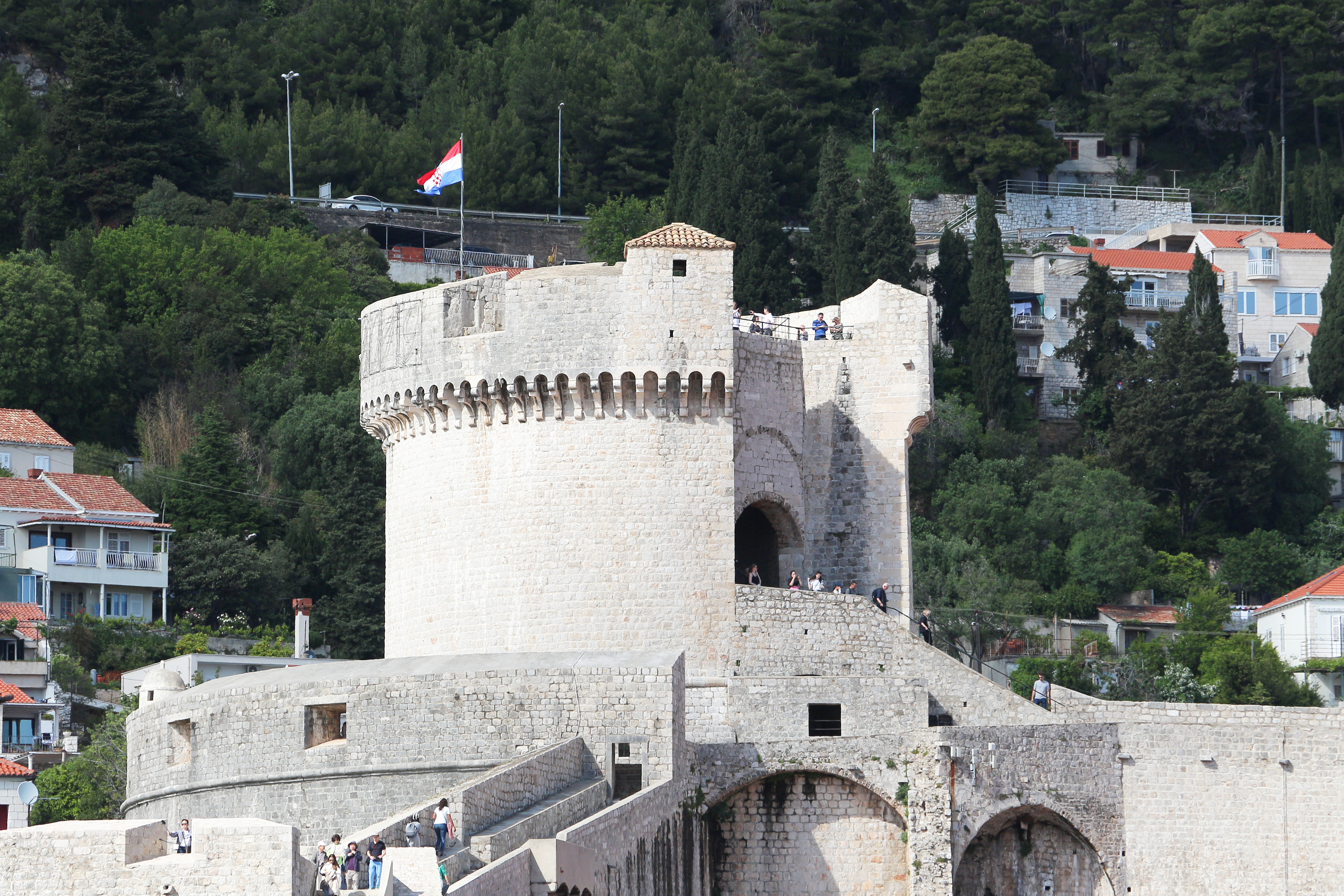
The Minčeta Tower is a symbol of the "unconquerable" city of Dubrovnik.

The Minčeta Tower was built by a local builder named Nicifor Ranjina and Italian engineers sent by Pope Pius II in 1463, at the height of the Turkish threat. Originally as a strong four-sided fort, it is the most prominent point in the defensive system towards the land. The tower's name derives from the name of the Menčetić family, who owned the ground upon which the tower was built. By its height and impressive volume, the tower dominates the northwestern high part of the city and its walls. In the middle of the 15th century, around the earlier quadrilateral fort, Michelozzo built a new round tower using new warfare technique and joined it to the new system of low scarp walls. The full six-meter (20 feet) thick walls of the new tower had a series of protected gun ports. The architect and sculptor Giorgio da Sebenico of Zadar continued the work on the Minčeta tower. He designed and built the high narrow round tower while the battlements are a later addition. The tower was completed in 1464 and became the symbol of the unconquerable city of Dubrovnik. (Note: "...symbol of the unconquerable city of Dubrovnik." Dubrovnik citizens surrendered to the French army in 1806 by permitting their entrance into the city. Although Dubrovnik was not conquered by France in war, two years later in 1808, Marshal Auguste de Marmont abolished the Republic of Ragusa and amalgamated its territory into the French Illyrian Provinces.)

After a long excavation, a 16th-century cannon foundry was discovered under Minčeta Tower in Gornji ugao (Upper Tower). It is now a museum.

==== Fort Bokar ====
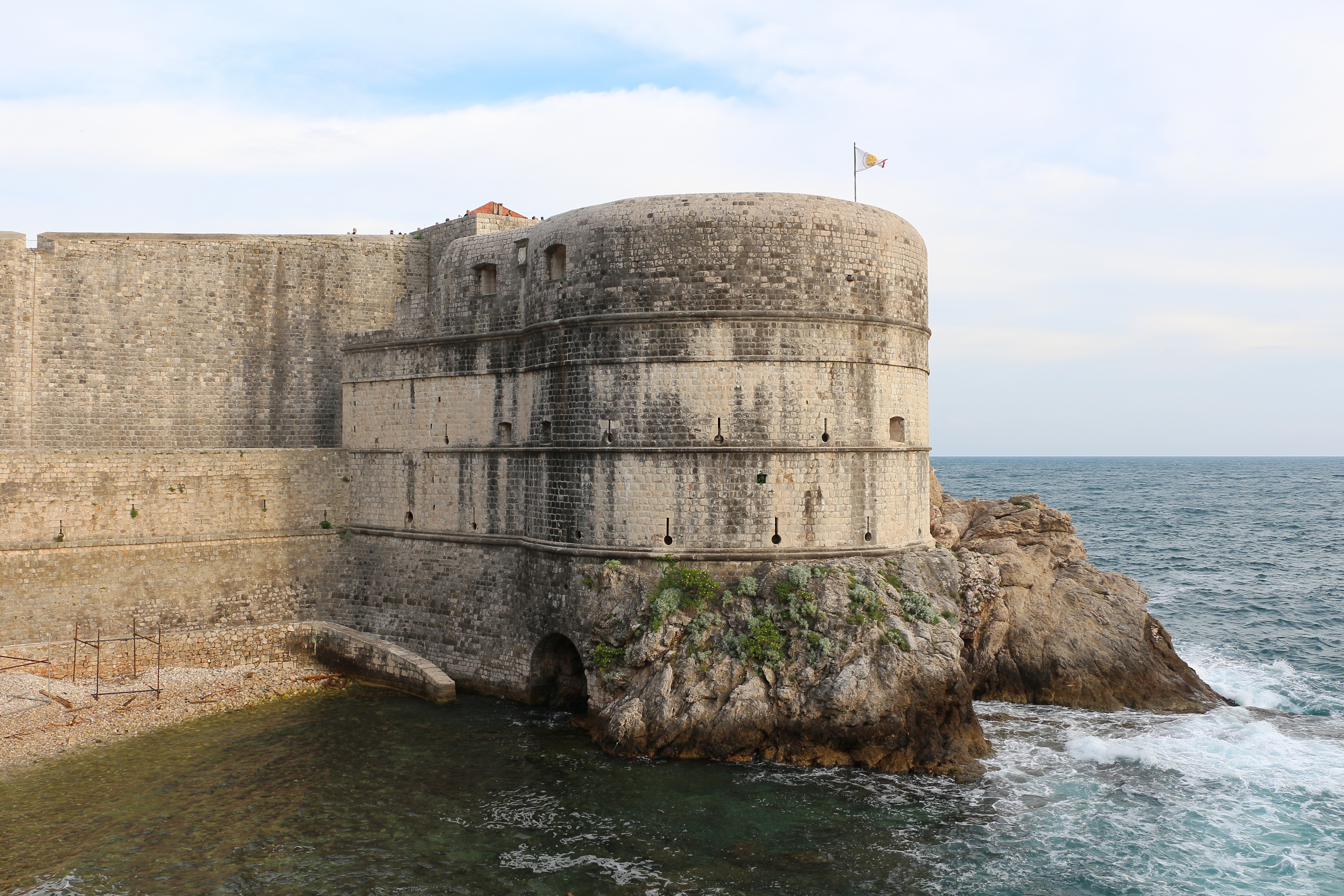
Fort Bokar is the key point in the defense of the Pila Gate.

The Fort Bokar, often called "Zvjezdan", is considered to be amongst the most beautiful instances of functional fortification architecture. Built as a two-story casemate fortress by Michelozzo from 1461 to 1463, while the city walls were being reconstructed, it stands in front of the medieval wall face protruding into space almost with its whole cylindrical volume. It was conceived as the key point in the defense of the Pila Gate, the western fortified entrance of the city; and after the Minčeta Tower, it is the second key point in the defense of the western land approach to the city.

==== St. John Fortress ====
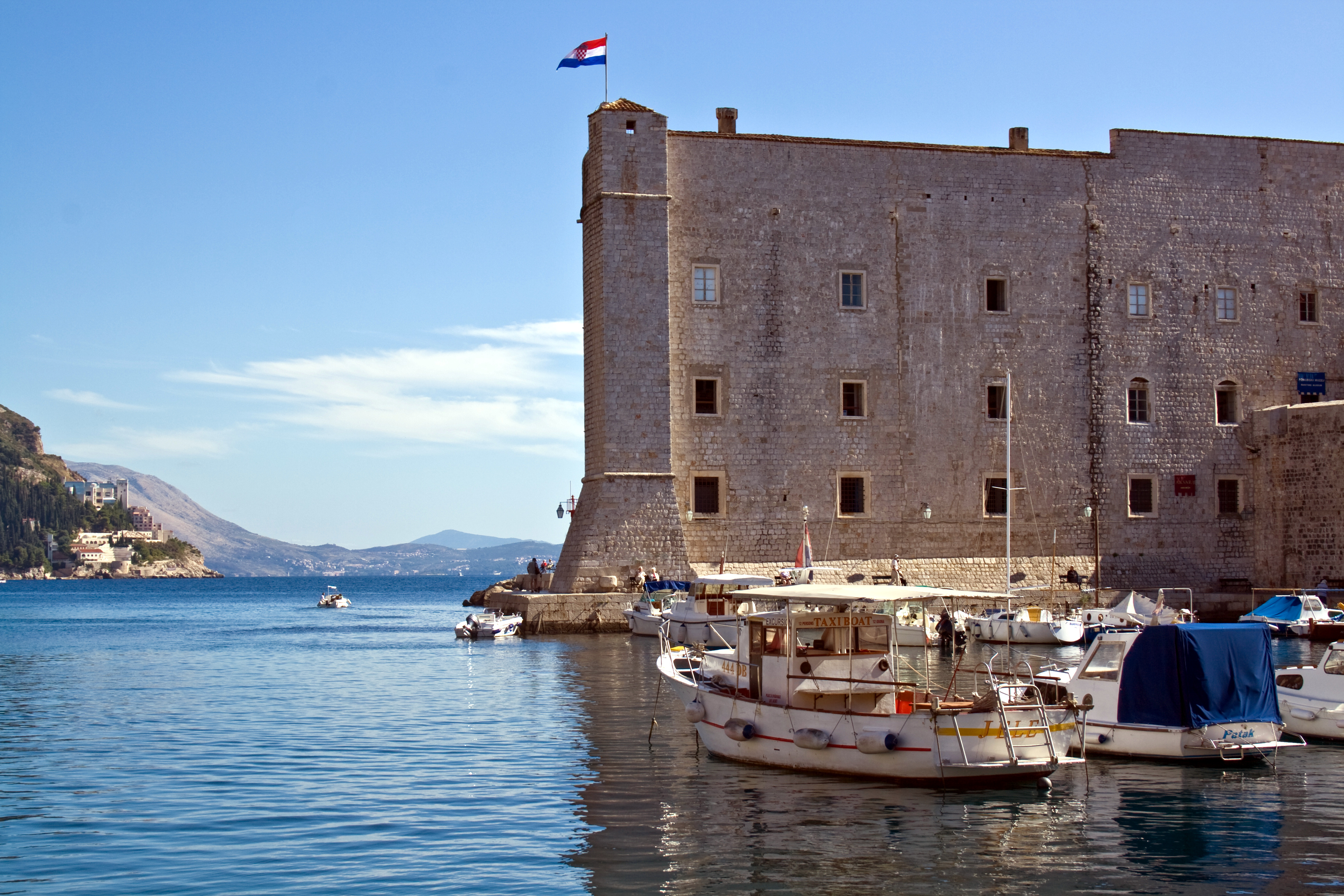
St. John Fortress prevented enemy ships from accessing the City Harbour.

The St. John Fortress (Croatian: Sveti Ivan), often called Mulo Tower, is a complex monumental building on the southeastern side of the old city port, controlling and protecting its entrance. The first fort was built in the mid 14th century, but it was modified on several occasions in the course of the 15th and 16th centuries, which can be seen in the triptych made by the painter Nikola Božidarević in the Dominican monastery. The painting shows Saint Blaise, the patron saint of Dubrovnik. Dominant in the port ambiance, the St. John Fortress prevented access of pirates and other enemy ships. Always cautious at the first sign of danger, the inhabitants of Dubrovnik used to close the entry into the port with heavy chains stretched between the St. John Fortress and the Kase jetty, and they also used to wall up all the port entries to the Great Arsenal.

Today, the fortress houses an aquarium on the ground floor, stocked with fish from various parts of the Adriatic Sea. On the upper floors there is an ethnographic and a maritime museum devoted to the Republic Maritime Period, the Age of Steam, the Second World War, and the section of techniques of sailing and navigation.

=== Detached forts ===
==== Revelin Fortress ====
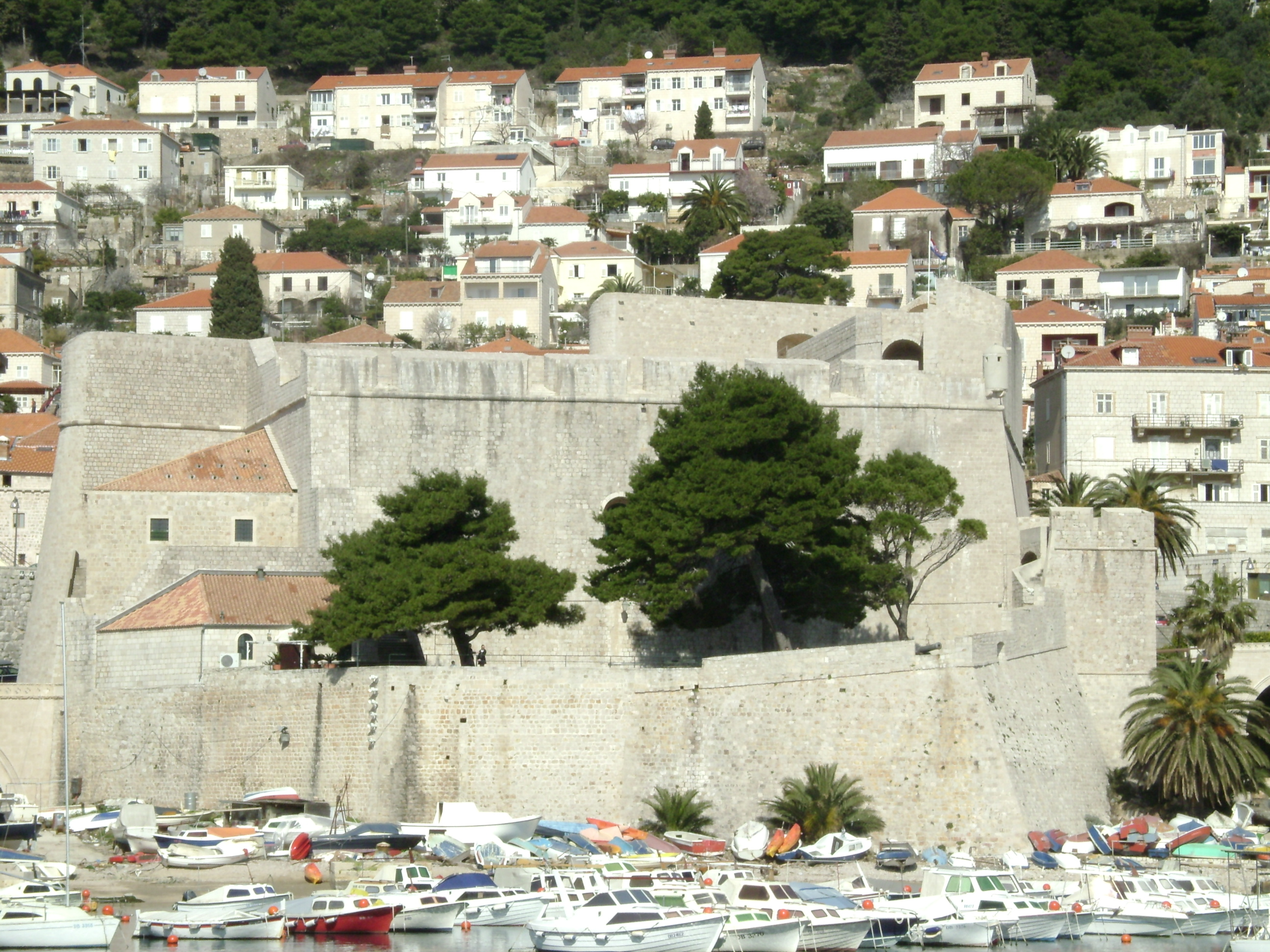
In 16th century Revelin Fortress became the strongest city fortress.

In the period of unmistakable Turkish danger and the fall of Bosnia under Turkish rule, a detached fortress providing additional protection to the land approach to the eastern Ploče Gate was built to the east of the city in 1462. The name Revelin derives from rivelino (ravelin), a term in military architecture which refers to work built opposite the city gate in order to afford better protection from enemy attack. Danger of Venetian assault suddenly increased in the times of the First Holy League, and it was necessary to strengthen this vulnerable point of the city fortifications. The Senate hired Antonio Ferramolino, an experienced builder of fortresses in the service of the Spanish admiral Doria, a trusted friend of the Republic. In 1538 the Senate approved his drawings of the new, much stronger Revelin Fortress. It took 11 years to build it, and during that time all other construction work in the city had stopped in order to finish this fortress as soon as possible.

The new Revelin became the strongest of the city fortresses, safeguarding the eastern land approach to the city. Shaped in the form of an irregular quadrilateral with one of its sides descending towards the sea, it is protected by a deep ditch on the other. One bridge crosses the protective ditch and connects it to the Ploče Gate, while another bridge connects it to the eastern suburb. The construction work was executed so well that the devastating earthquake of 1667 did not damage Revelin. Divided into three large vaulted rooms in its interior, Revelin became the administrative center of the Republic.

==== St. Lawrence Fortress ====
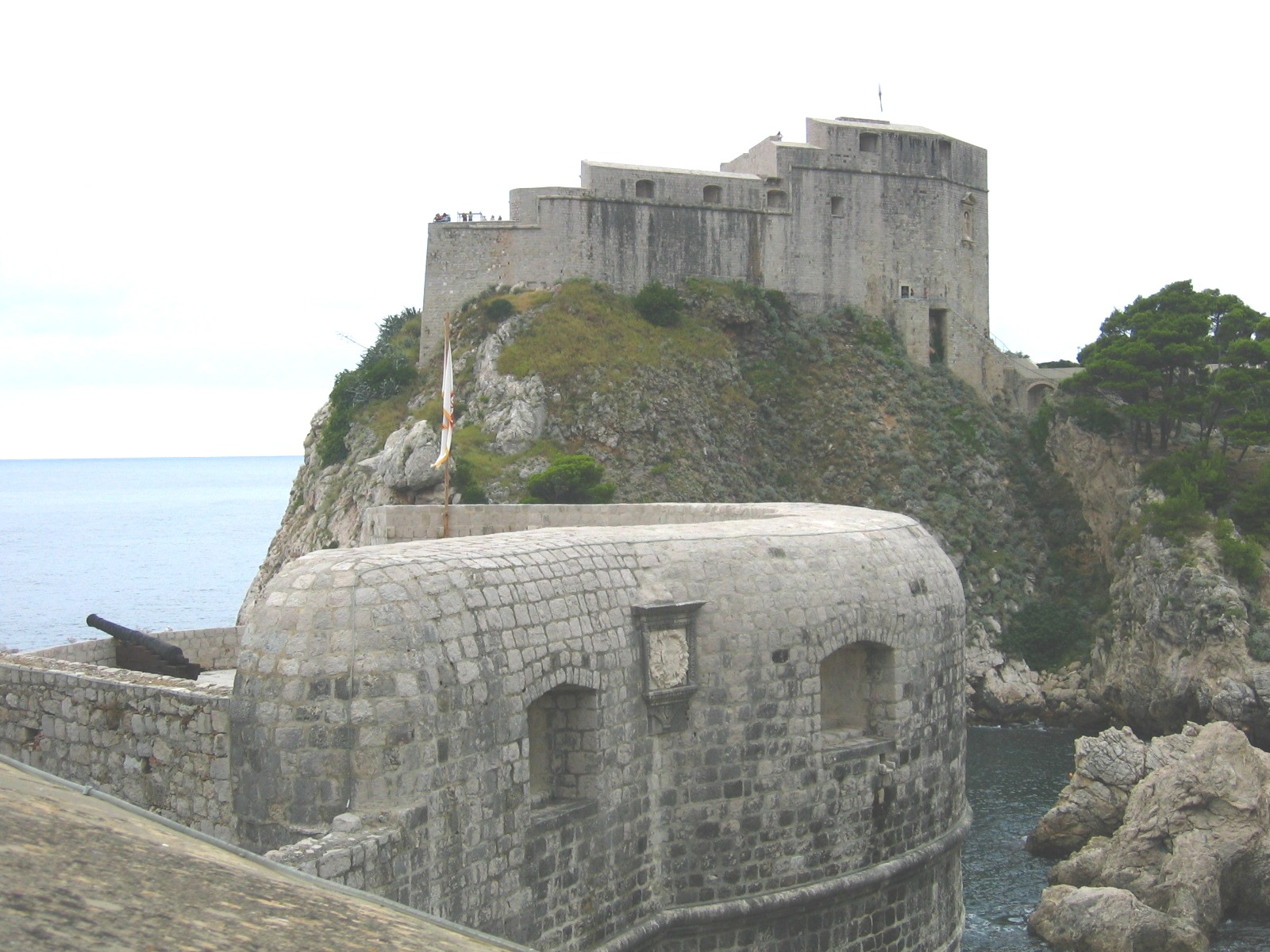
The walls of St. Lawrence Fortress exposed to enemy fire are almost 12 metres (39 ft) thick.

St. Lawrence Fortress (Croatian: Lovrijenac), often called Dubrovnik's Gibraltar, is located outside the western city walls, 37 metres (121 ft) above sea level. The fortress has a quadrilateral court with mighty arches and, as its height is uneven, it has 3 terraces with powerful parapets with the broadest one looking south towards the sea. Lovrijenac was defended with 10 large cannons, the largest and most famous of which was called "Lizard" (Croatian: Gušter). The walls exposed to enemy fire are almost 12 meters (39 feet) thick, but the large wall surface facing the city does not exceed 60 centimetres (2 feet). Two drawbridges lead to the fort, there being the inscription "Non Bene Pro Toto Libertas Venditur Auro" — "Freedom is not to be sold for all the treasures in the world." above the gate. To ensure loyalty, the troops in St. Lawrence Fortress were rotated every 30 days. And to ensure complete loyalty, they were given only 30 days of rations when they went into the fort. According to old scripts it was built in only three months.

Today its interior is a popular stage in Europe, and known for William Shakespeare's Hamlet performances.

== Fortifications around Dubrovnik ==
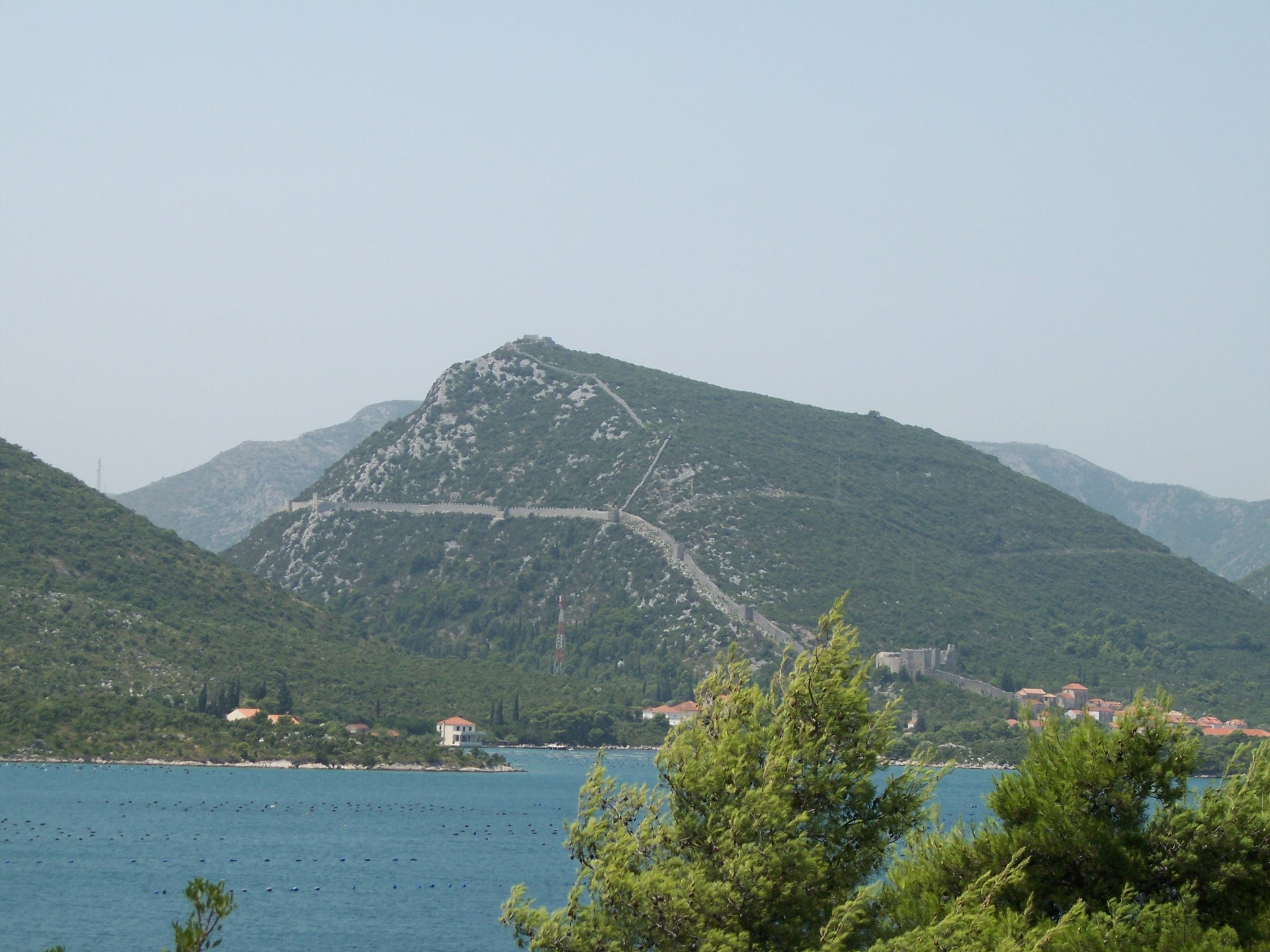
Walls of Ston are 5.5 kilometers (3.4 mi) long.

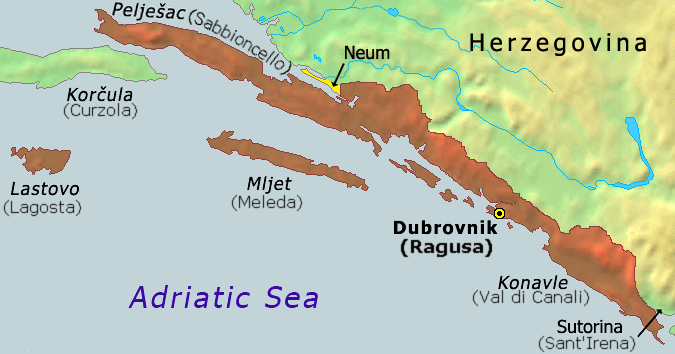
Fortifications around Dubrovnik were set up along Republic's borders.

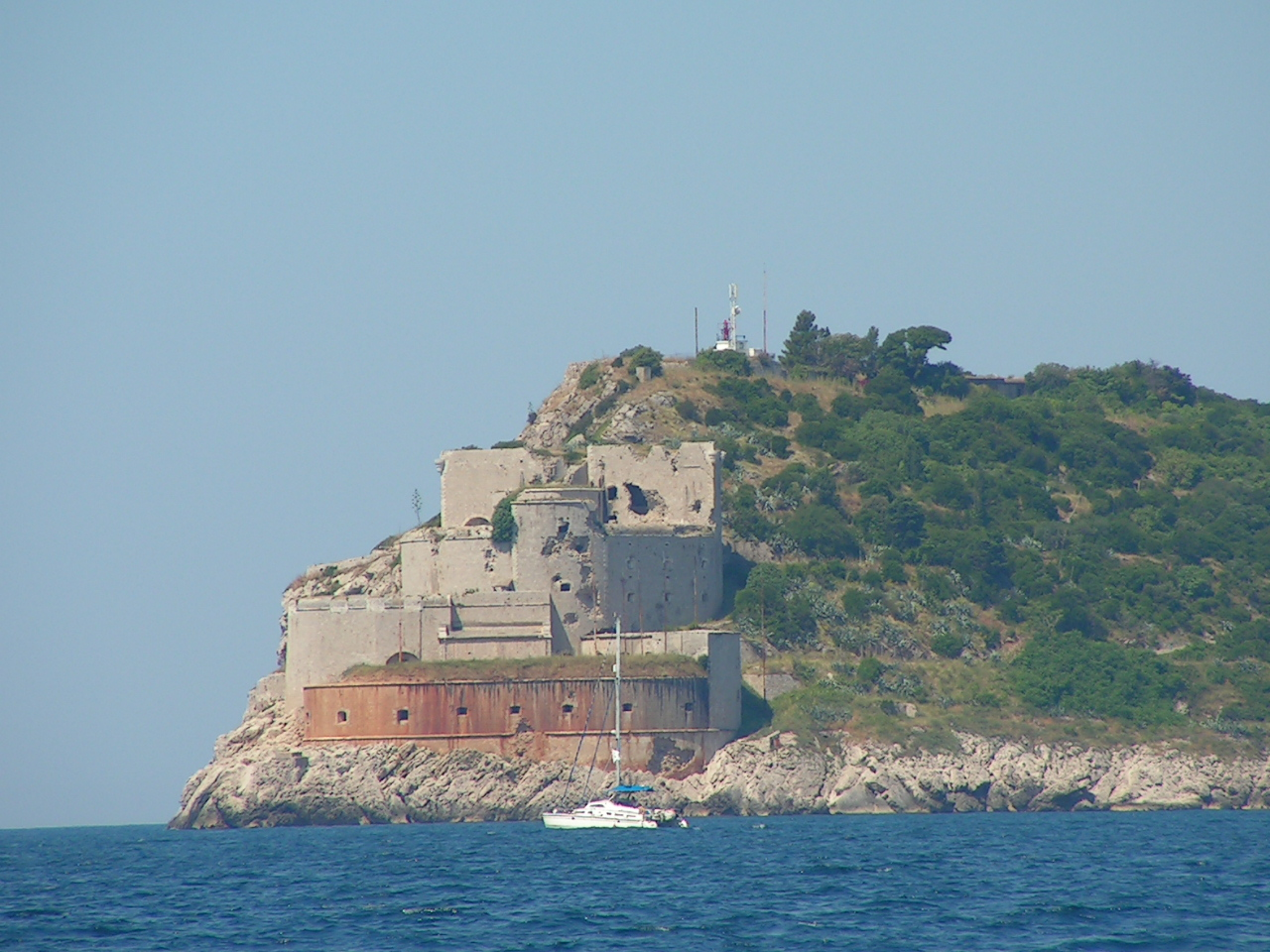
The Prevlaka Fortress from the 19th century was built as a part of the fortification system of Bay of Kotor.

=== Walls of Ston ===
The Walls of Ston are originally a series of defensive stone walls of more than 7 kilometres (4.3 mi) long. Despite its small size, the well protected Republic of Ragusa decided to use Pelješac to build another line of defense. At Pelješac's narrowest point, just before joining the mainland, a wall from Ston to Mali Ston was built.

Today's 5.5-kilometre (3.4 mi) long wall that links these two small communities has the shape of a pentagon. It was completed in the 15th century along with other 40 towers and 5 fortresses. The "wall" meant protection to the precious salt pans that greatly contributed to Dubrovnik's wealth, which are still being worked today.

=== Sokol Fortress ===
The Sokol Fortress (Croatian: Sokol grad, lit. 'Falcon fort') was one of the largest and most important fortresses on the territory of the Republic of Ragusa, due to its position in the mountainous region near the Bosnian inland. It was built at the location of earlier Illyrian and later Roman fortifications, evident from the remains of ceramics and Roman bricks in its walls. In 1391, the Sanković brothers, at that time the rulers of Konavle, gave to the Republic of Ragusa full authority over the Falcon Fortress, while it came under republic's final possession only in 1423.

Due to its strategic importance, the Republic of Ragusa constantly invested in the maintenance of the fortress, which contained a cistern, a powder storage, wine and food cellars, sentry-boxes, military barracks, and sanctuary buildings to accommodate refugees from nearby villages in the event of war.

=== Imperial Fortress ===
The Fortress is placed at the top of the mountain Srđ, just above the city of Dubrovnik. It was built during the time of the Illyrian Provinces in 1806 by Marshal Marmont, called the Imperial, in honor of emperor Napoleon. The fortress was strategically important to defend the northern side of the city.

=== Prevlaka Fortress ===
This fortress is placed at Ponta Oštro, at the very end of Prevlaka peninsula. It was built in the mid-19th century, between 1856 and 1862, as part of the fortification system of the Bay of Kotor at the time of the Austrian Empire's Kingdom of Dalmatia. By its monumentality and unique structure, it presents an exceptional example of military architecture of its time. Today, the fortress is out of use and badly damaged by various destructions during history.

== City walls during sieges ==
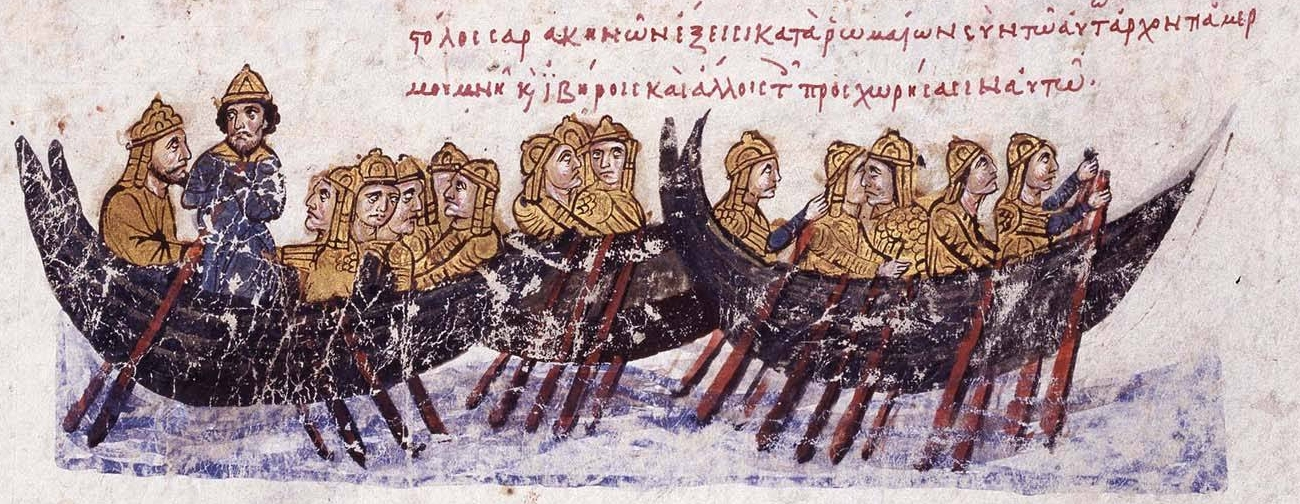
Saracen corsairs in 867 laying siege to Dubrovnik (Madrid Skylitzes manuscript).

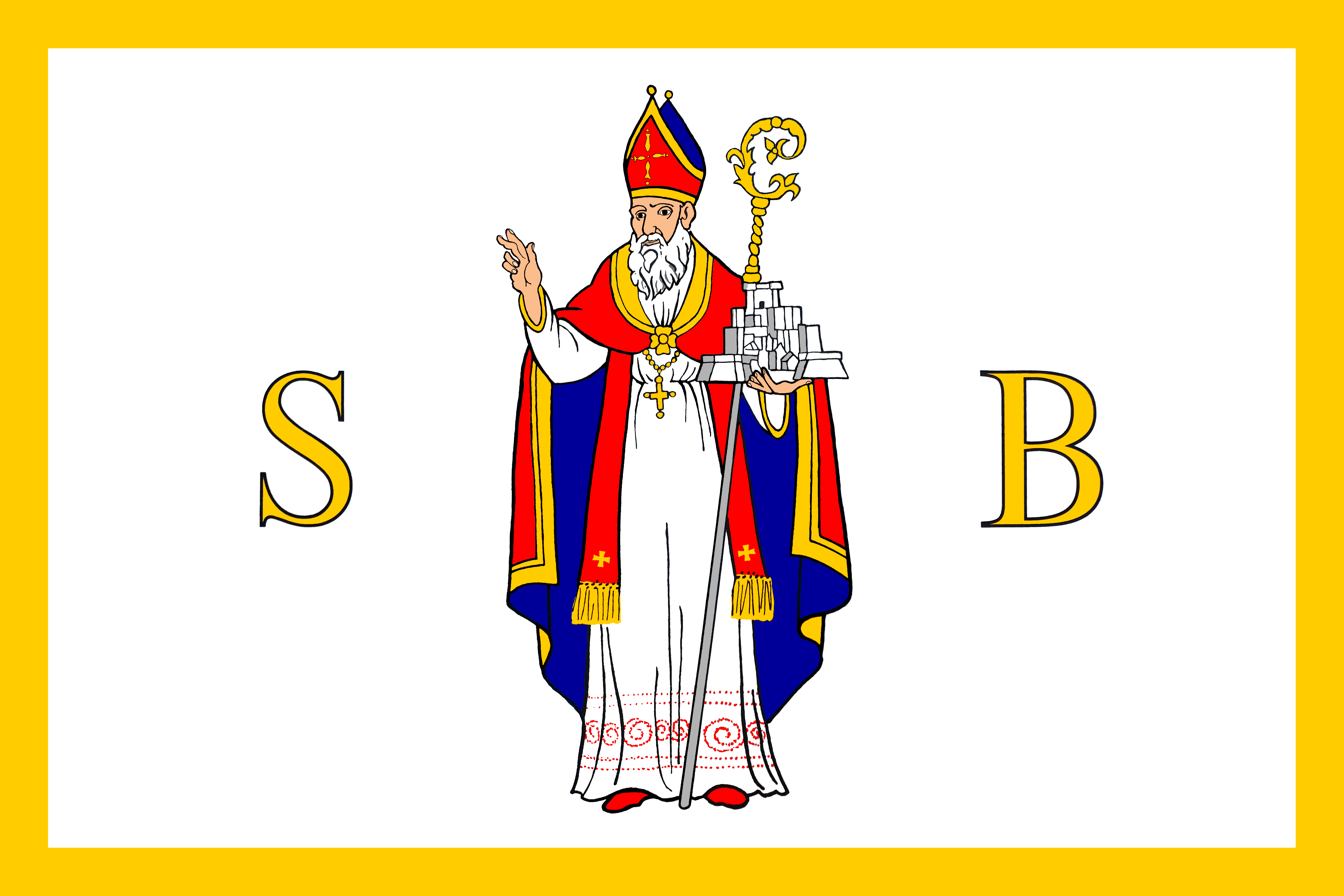
Flag of the Republic of Ragusa with Saint Blaise, the patron saint of Dubrovnik.

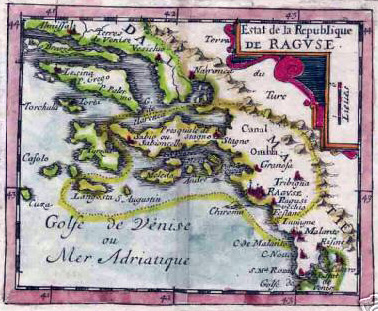
Old map of the Republic of Ragusa, dated from 1678.

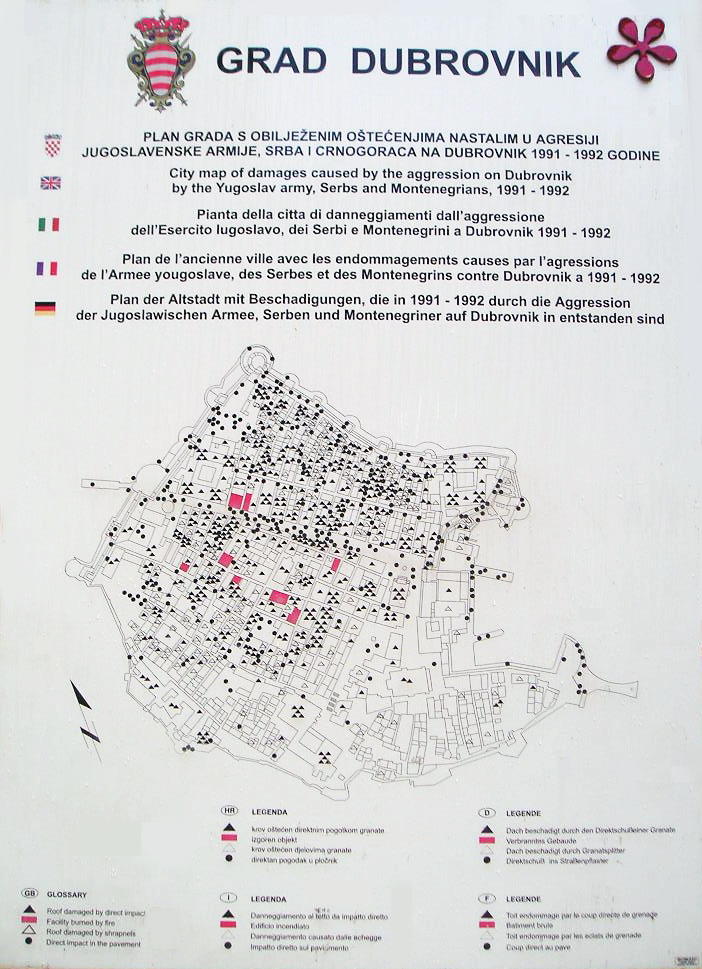
Marked damage on city map, from the shelling by the Yugoslav People's Army.

=== Saracen siege in 866–867 ===
In 866, a major Arab raid along Dalmatia struck Budva and Kotor, and then laid siege to Dubrovnik in 867. The city appealed to Byzantine Emperor Basil the Macedonian, who responded by sending over one hundred ships. Finally, the 866–867 Saracens' siege of Dubrovnik, which lasted fifteen months, was raised due to the intervention of Basil I, who sent a fleet under the command of Niketas Oryphas in relief of the city. After this successful intervention, the Byzantine navy sailed along the coast collecting promises of loyalty to the empire from the Dalmatian cities.

=== Venetian siege in 948 ===
With the weakening of Byzantium, Venice began to see Ragusa as a rival who needed to be brought under her control, but the attempt to conquer the city in 948 failed. The citizens of the city attributed this to Saint Blaise, whom they adopted as the patron saint of the city.

=== Nemanja's siege in 1185 ===
After some territorial disputes, war broke out between Stefan Nemanja, Grand prince of Raška, and the city of Dubrovnik, at that time under Norman suzerainty. In 1185, Nemanja attacked the city and laid siege to it, but a Ragusan counter-attack drove Nemanja's forces back. According to chronicles from Dubrovnik, which are accepted by most historians, the siege ultimately failed. (Note: However, there are some indications that the siege was severe and possibly resulted in a partial or integral penetration of Nemanja's forces into part of the city's area.) How much help Dubrovnik received from the Normans while repelling the siege is also not known exactly.

=== Venetian and Fourth Crusades siege in 1205 ===
In 1205, the Republic of Venice invaded Dalmatia with the forces of the Fourth Crusade. Ragusa was forced to pay a tribute, eventually becoming a source of supplies for Venice, thus saving itself from being sacked like Zadar in the Siege of Zara, used as Venice's naval base in the southern Adriatic Sea. In the 14th century, after liberation from Venetian supremacy, extensive work was done on the walls to ensure the republic's liberty.

=== Siege by Stjepan Vukčić Kosača in 1451 ===
In 1451, the very powerful Bosnian regional lord Herzeg Stjepan Vukčić Kosača attacked Dubrovnik, and laid siege to the city. He had earlier been made a Ragusan nobleman and, consequently, the Ragusan government now proclaimed him a traitor. A reward of 15,000 ducats, a palace in Dubrovnik worth 2,000 ducats, and an annual income of 300 ducats was offered to anyone who would kill him, along with the promise of hereditary Ragusan nobility which also helped hold this promise to whoever did the deed. Stjepan was so scared by the threat that he finally raised the siege.

=== Russian siege in 1806 ===
By 1800, the Republic had a highly organized network of consulates and consular offices in more than eighty cities and ports around the world. In 1806, the forces of the First French Empire, led by General Jacques Lauriston entered the territory of the Republic, violating its strict neutrality. They demanded to be allowed to rest and be provided with food and drink in the city before continuing on to take possession of their newly acquired holdings in the Bay of Kotor. However, this was a deception because as soon as they entered the city, they proceeded to occupy it in the name of Napoleon. Almost immediately after the beginning of the French occupation, Russian and Montenegrin troops entered Ragusan territory and began fighting the French army, raiding and pillaging everything along the way and culminating in a siege of the occupied city during which 3,000 cannonballs fell on it. In 1808, Marshal Auguste de Marmont abolished the Republic of Ragusa and amalgamated its territory into the French Illyrian Provinces, himself becoming the "Duke of Ragusa" (Duc de Raguse).

=== Anglo-Austrian siege in 1814 ===
Austria declared war on France in August 1813 and by the Autumn the Royal Navy enjoyed unopposed domination over the Adriatic sea. Working in conjunction with the Austrian armies now invading the Illyrian Provinces and Northern Italy Rear Admiral Thomas Fremantle's ships were able to rapidly transport British and Austrian troops from one point to another, forcing the surrender of the strategic ports one after another. Captain William Hoste with his ship HMS Bacchante (38 guns) along with HMS Saracen an 18 gun brig, arrived at Ragusa already under siege by Ragusan insurgent forces. The Ragusans, British and the Austrians were able to take the Imperial fortress and positions on Lokrum island. By hauling cannon up to Srđ hill they bombarded the city until the French General Joseph de Montrichard decided he had no choice but to surrender, especially since he was faced with another insurrection in the city itself, as Ragusans wanted to restore the Republic. The Austrian General Todor Milutinović, fueling the personal ambition of one of the temporary governors of the Republic, Biagio Bernardo Caboga, with promises of power and influence (which were later cut short and who died in ignominy, branded as a traitor by his people), managed to convince him that the gate to the east was to be kept closed to the Ragusan forces and to let the Austrian and British forces enter the city from the west, without any Ragusan soldiers, once the French garrison of 500 troops had surrendered, after which the Austrians proceeded to occupy the city.

=== Yugoslav army siege in 1991–1992 ===
The Siege of Dubrovnik (Croatian: Opsada Dubrovnika) is a term marking the battle and siege of the city of Dubrovnik and the surrounding area in Croatia as part of the Croatian War of Independence. Dubrovnik was besieged and attacked by forces of the Serb-dominated Yugoslav People's Army (JNA) in late 1991, with the major fighting ending in early 1992, and the Croatian counterattack finally lifting the siege and liberating the area in mid-1992. At the International Criminal Tribunal for the former Yugoslavia (ICTY), the prosecution alleged that, "It was the objective of the Serb forces to detach this area from Croatia and to annex it to Montenegro."

In 1991, the American Institute of Architects condemned the bombardment of the city's buildings. The Institute for the Protection of Cultural Monuments, in conjunction with UNESCO, found that, of the 824 buildings in the Old Town, 563 (or 68.33 percent) had been hit by projectiles during the siege. Of these 563, nine buildings had been completely destroyed by one of several major fires that occurred during the siege. In 1993, the Institute for the Rehabilitation of Dubrovnik and UNESCO estimated the total cost for restoring public, private, and religious buildings, streets, squares, fountains, ramparts, gates, and bridges at $9,657,578. By the end of 1999, over $7,000,000 had been spent on restoration. It is a testament to the resilience of the ancient walls that more buildings in the old town were not destroyed during the bombardment; the ancient walls in fact were more effective at resisting modern weaponry than contemporary structures in the city's periphery.

== See also ==
- Fort Lovrijenac
- List of walls
- List of cities with defensive walls
- List of castles in Croatia

== Sources ==
- Milić, Bruno (1995). Razvoj grada kroz stoljeća II, Srednji vijek (in Croatian). Zagreb: Školska knjiga. ISBN 953-0-31641-0.
- "Dubrovnik". Encyclopædia Britannica Online. Encyclopædia Britannica, Inc..
- Oliver, Jeanne (2007). Croatia (4th ed.). Lonely Planet. ISBN 978-1-74104-916-9.
- "City walls of Dubrovnik" (PDF). Geographica d.o.o. Archived from the original (PDF) on 24 January 2021.
- "The city walls". Diu.hr. Dubrovnik International University. Archived from the original on 23 February 2010.
- "City Walls". Sitiunescoadriatico.org. Province of Ferrara. Archived from the original on 24 September 2015.
- "Dubrovnik City walls". Dubrovnik-guide.net. Archived from the original on 10 February 2010.
- Stewart, James (2006). Croatia. Cadogan Guides. ISBN 1-86011-319-2.
- Harris, Robin (2003). Dubrovnik, A History. Saqi Books. ISBN 0-86356-332-5.
- "The City Harbour". Tzdubrovnik.hr. Dubrovnik Tourist Board. Archived from the original on 23 February 2014.
- Zlatno doba Dubrovnika XV. i XVI. stoljeće, Muzejski prostor i Dubrovački muzej, Zagreb-Dubrovnik 1987.
- Fine, John Van Antwerp (1991). The early medieval Balkans: a critical survey from the sixth to the late twelfth century. University of Michigan Press. ISBN 0-472-08149-7.
- Fine, John Van Antwerp (1994). The Late Medieval Balkans: A Critical Survey from the Late Twelfth Century to the Ottoman Conquest. University of Michigan Press. ISBN 0-472-08260-4.
- Lane, Frederic Chapin (1973). Venice, a Maritime Republic. Johns Hopkins University Press. ISBN 0-8018-1460-X.
- Vojnović, Lujo (2009). Pad Dubrovnika (1797.-1806.). Fortuna. ISBN 978-953-95981-9-6.
