= Mihajlo Hranjac =

Croatian architect

Mihajlo Hranjac was a Croatian local builder active in the Republic of Ragusa (Dubrovnik).

The Outer Gate of Ploča was designed and constructed by him in 1628. He also worked on City Harbour.

== See also ==
- List of Croatian architects
- Walls of Dubrovnik
