= Lovrijenac =

Fortress and theater in Dubrovnik, Croatia

St. Lawrence Fortress Lovrijenac Fortezza di San Lorenzo
- Dubrovnik; Dalmatia; Croatia
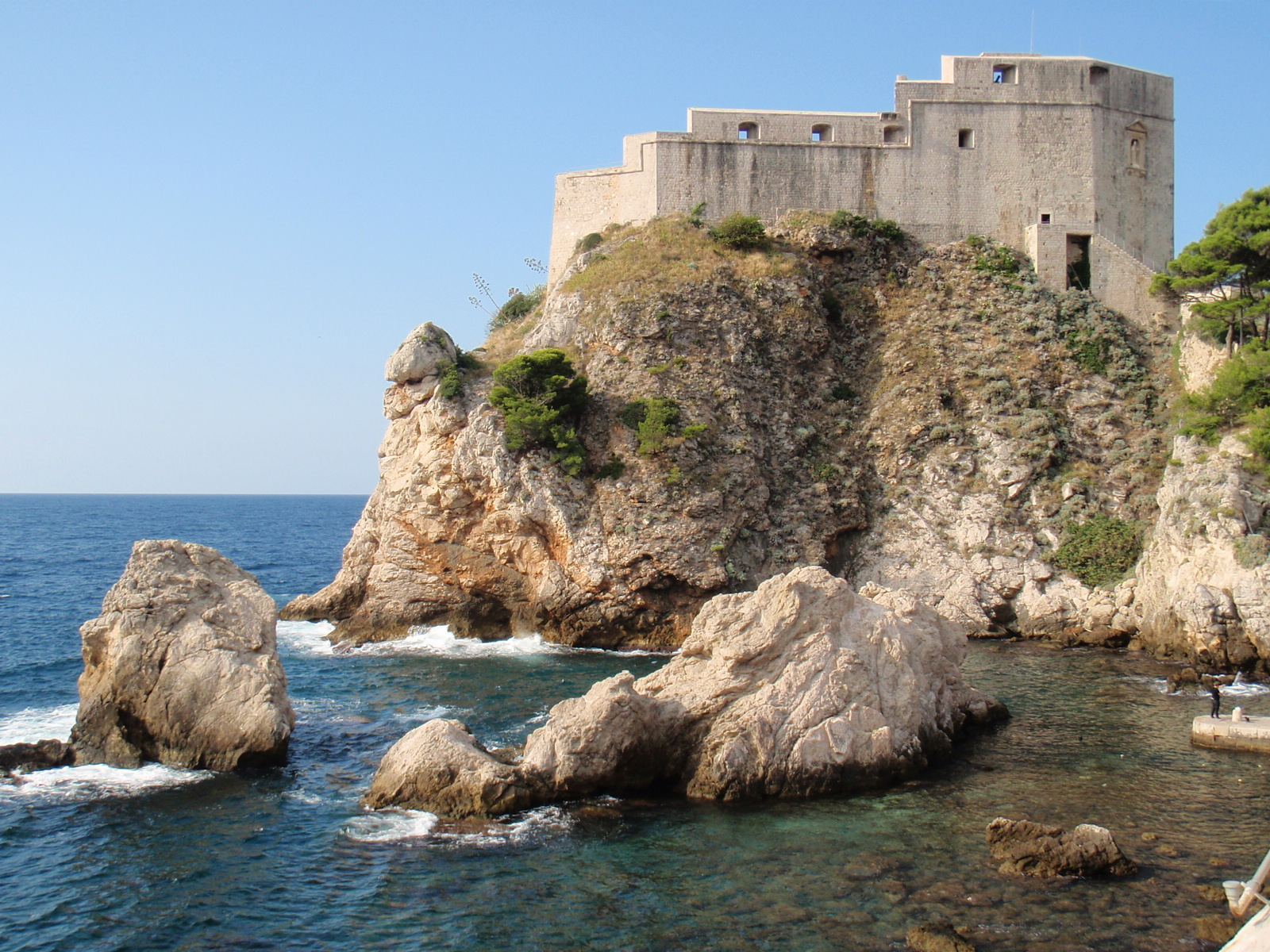
- Fort Lovrijenac

Site information
- Type: Fort / Fortress
- Owner: City of Dubrovnik, Croatia
- Controlled by: Republic of Ragusa (Dubrovnik)
- Open to the public: Yes
- Condition: Well-preserved or intact

Location
- Coordinates: 42°38′27″N 18°06′16″E

Site history
- Built by: Dubrovnik citizens
- Materials: Limestone

Fort Lovrijenac or St. Lawrence Fortress, Italian Fortezza di San Lorenzo, often called "Dubrovnik's Gibraltar", is a fortress and theater outside the western wall of the city of Dubrovnik in Croatia, 37 metres (121 ft) above sea level. Famous for its plays and importance in resisting Venetian rule, it overshadows the two entrances to the city, from the sea, and by land. Early in the 11th century, the Venetians attempted to build a fort on the same spot where Fort Lovrijenac currently stands. If they had succeeded, they would have kept Dubrovnik under their power, but the people of the city beat them to it. The "Chronicles of Ragusa" reveal how the fort was built within just three months and from then on constantly reconstructed. When the Venetian ships arrived, full of materials for the construction of the fort, they were told to return to Venice.

== Construction Date ==
Chronologists date the fort to 1018 or 1038. However first records of the forts existence are from 1301 when the council voted on the Commander of the Fort.

== Layout of the fort ==
Lovrijenac has a triangular shape with three terraces. The thickness of the walls facing the outside reach 12 metres (39 ft) whereas the section of the walls facing the inside, the actual city, are only 60 centimetres (24 in) thick. Two drawbridges lead to the fort and above the gate, there is an inscription Non Bene Pro Toto Libertas Venditur Auro (Liberty Cannot Be Sold for All The Gold in the World).

== In culture ==
Lovrijenac's use as a stage was a recent addition to the history of the fort, and the performance of Shakespeare's Hamlet has become the symbol of Dubrovnik Summer Festival.

A production of A Midsummer Nights Dream was performed here as part of Midsummer Scene in the summer of 2017 and 2018. The TV series Knightfall, an historical fiction drama about the Knights Templar started filming during the last week of June 2017 around the fort and the bay of Pile, these scenes were meant to depict the Siege of Acre (1291).

== Gallery ==
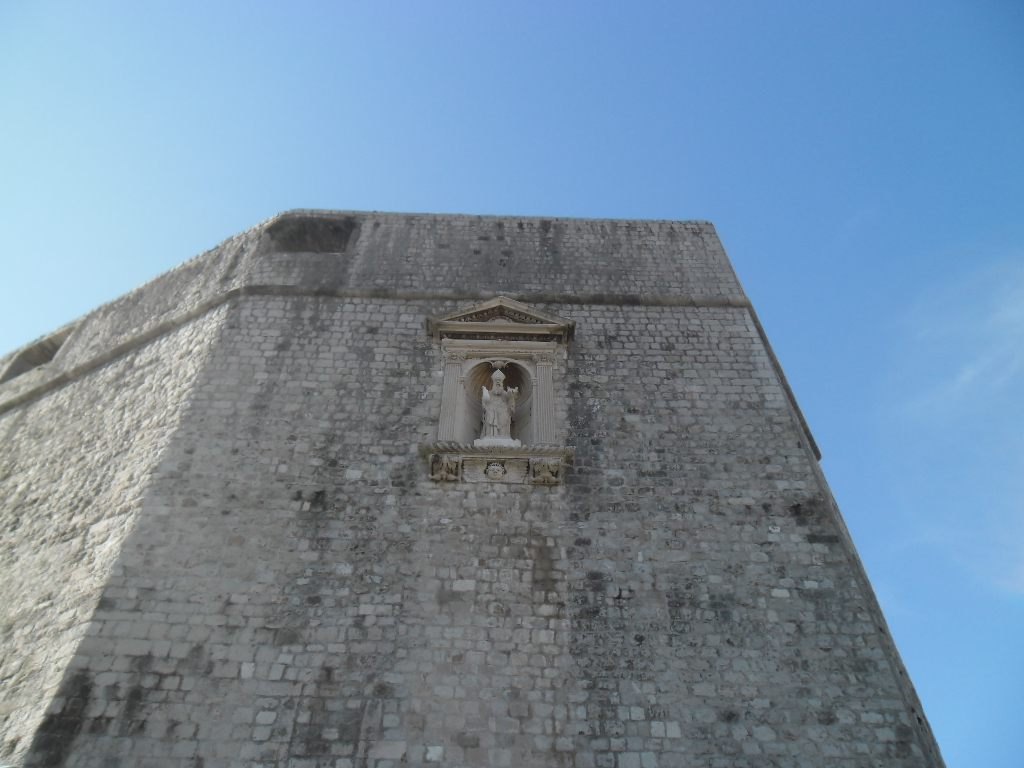

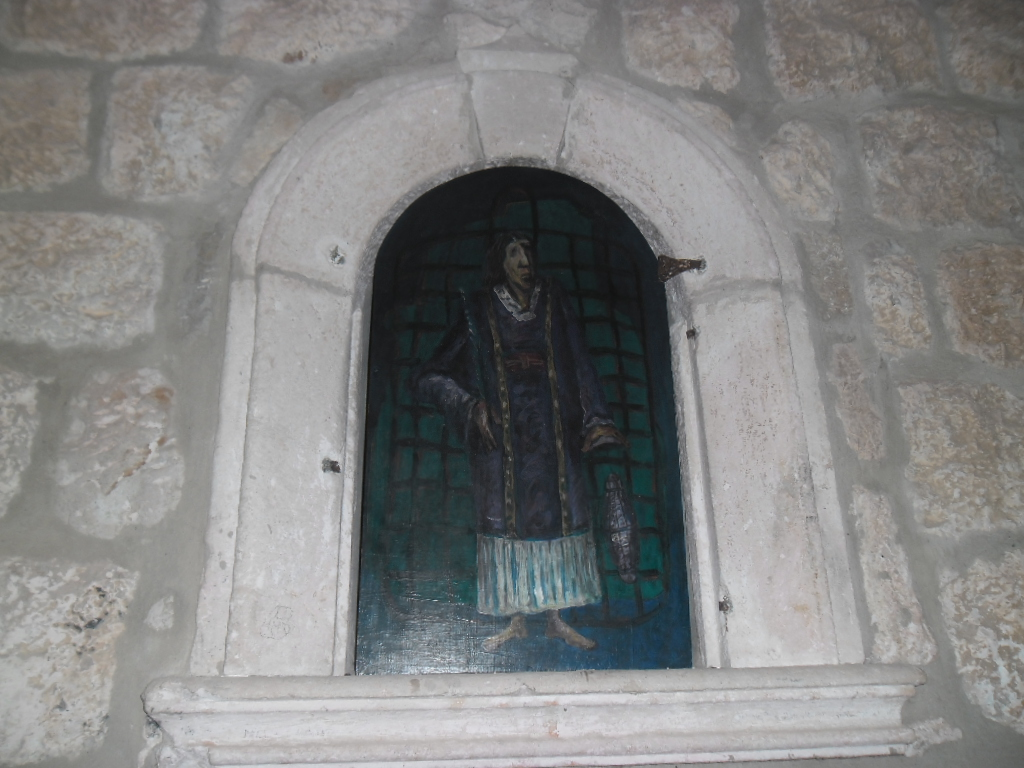

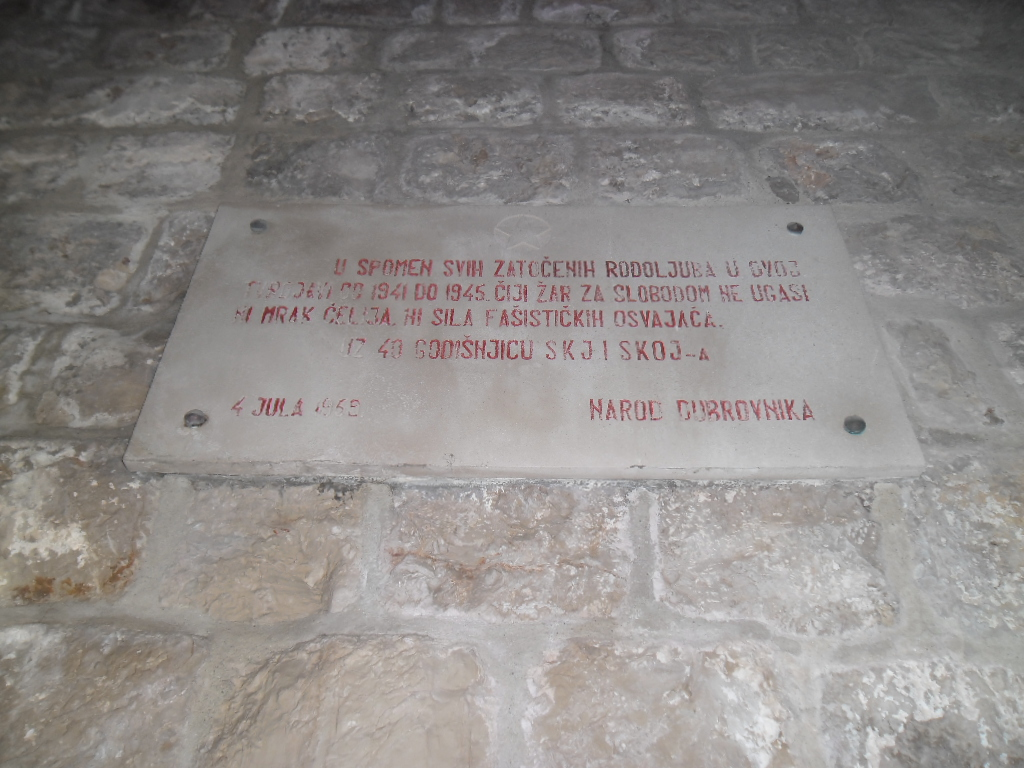

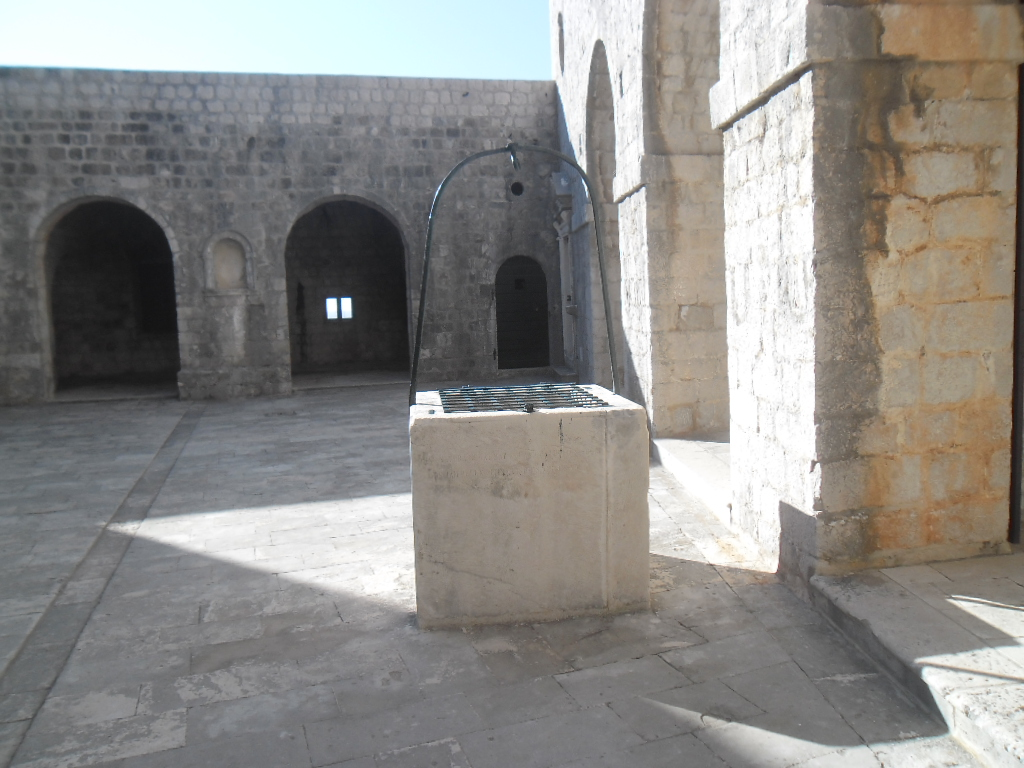

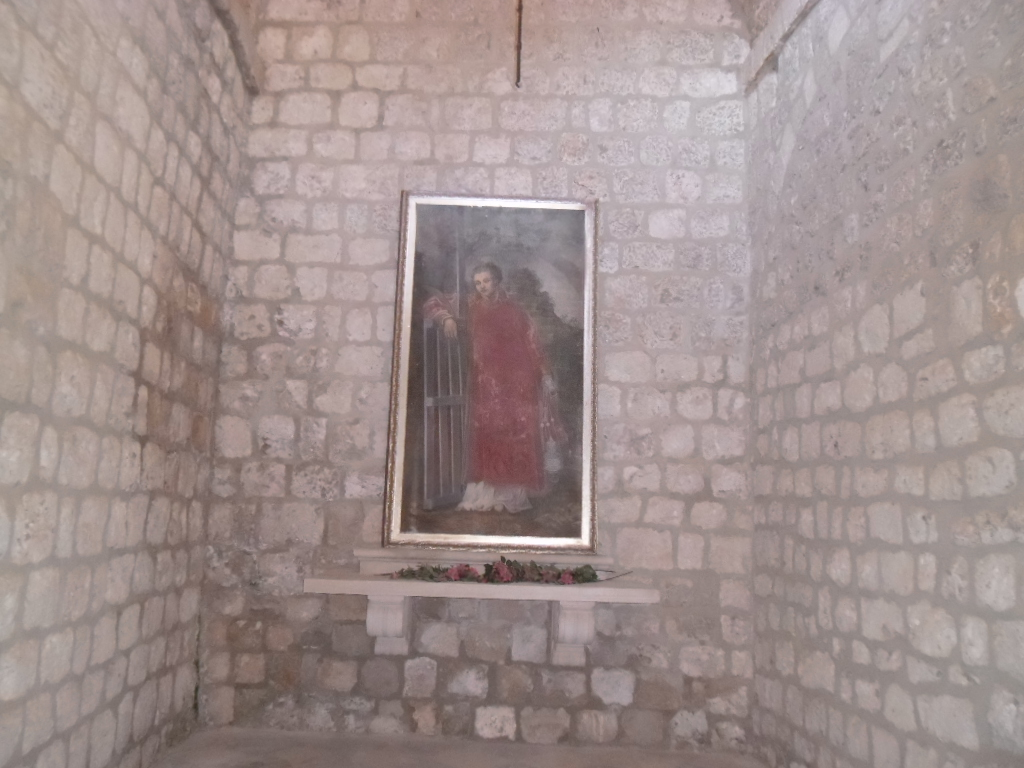

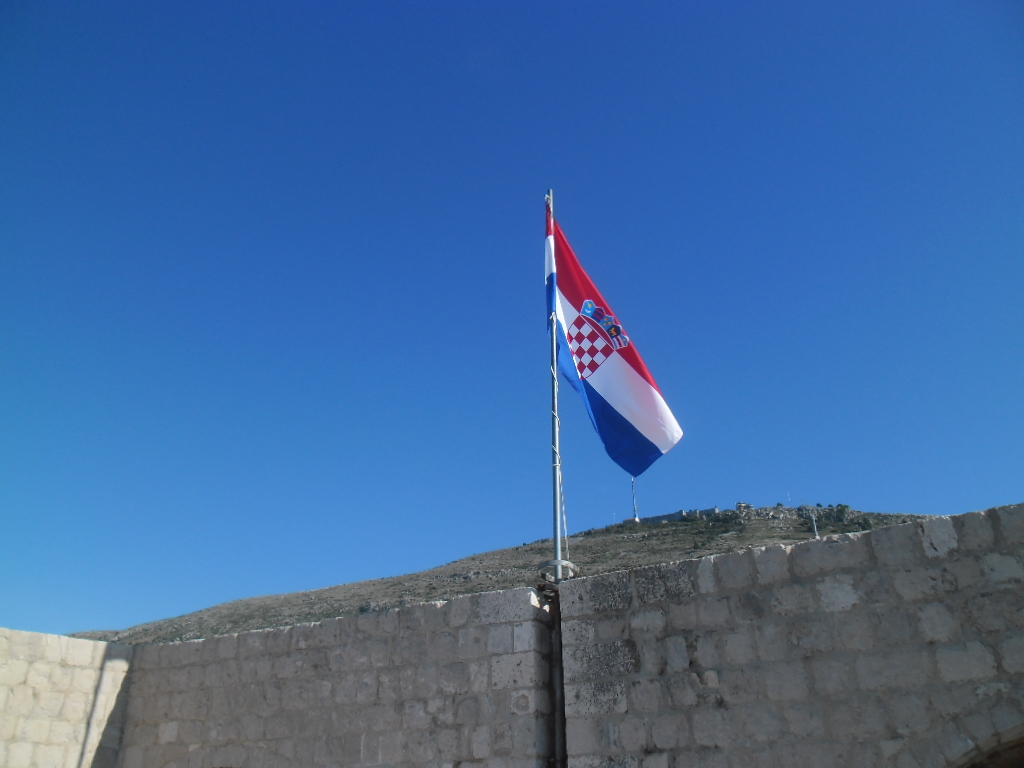

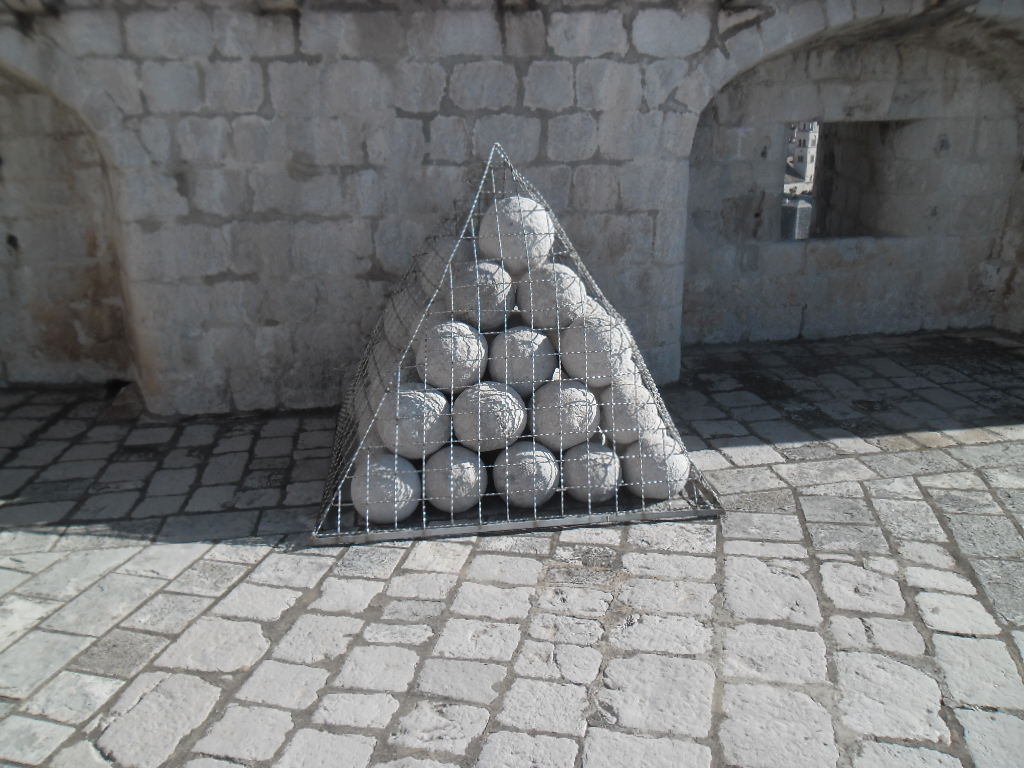

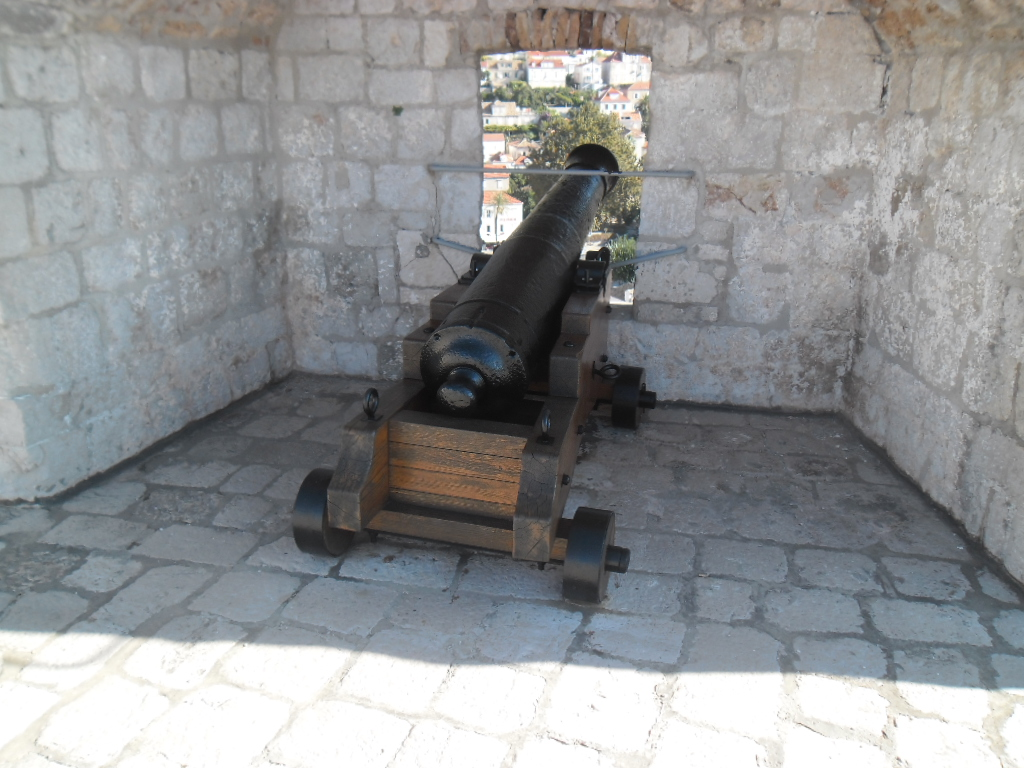

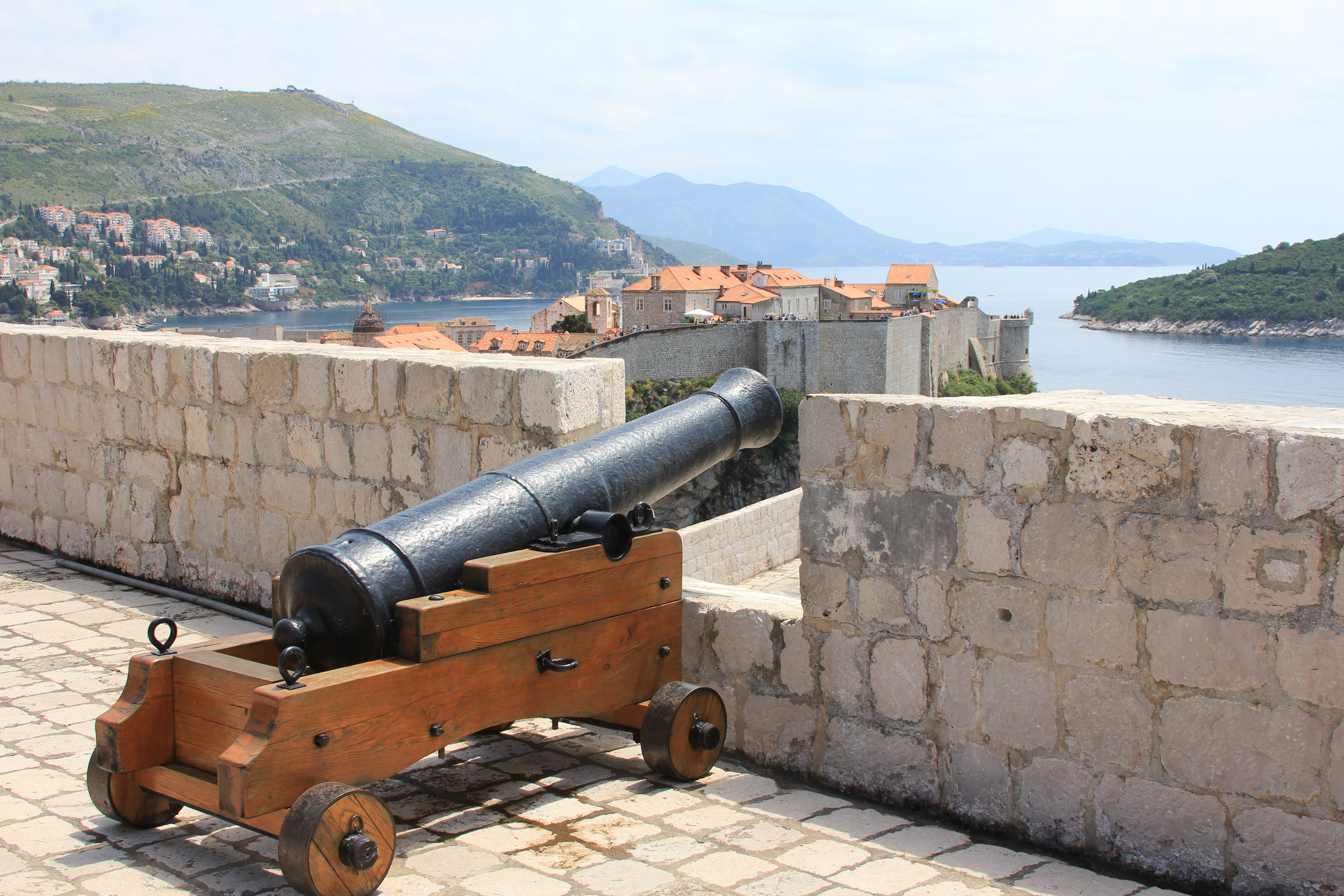

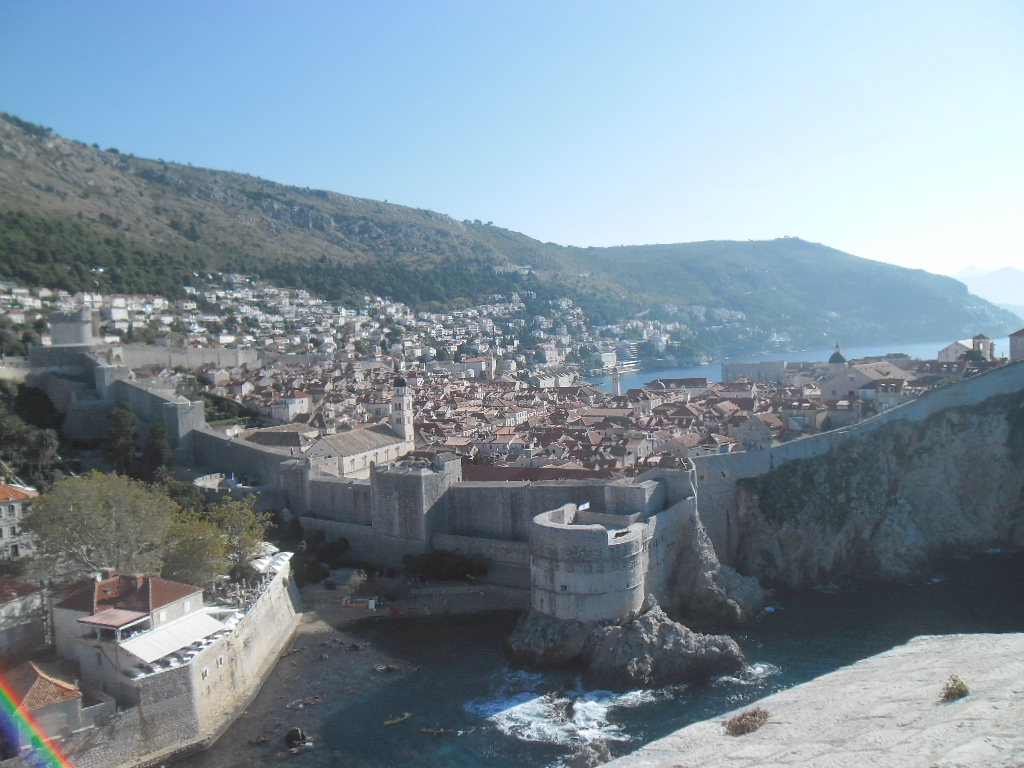

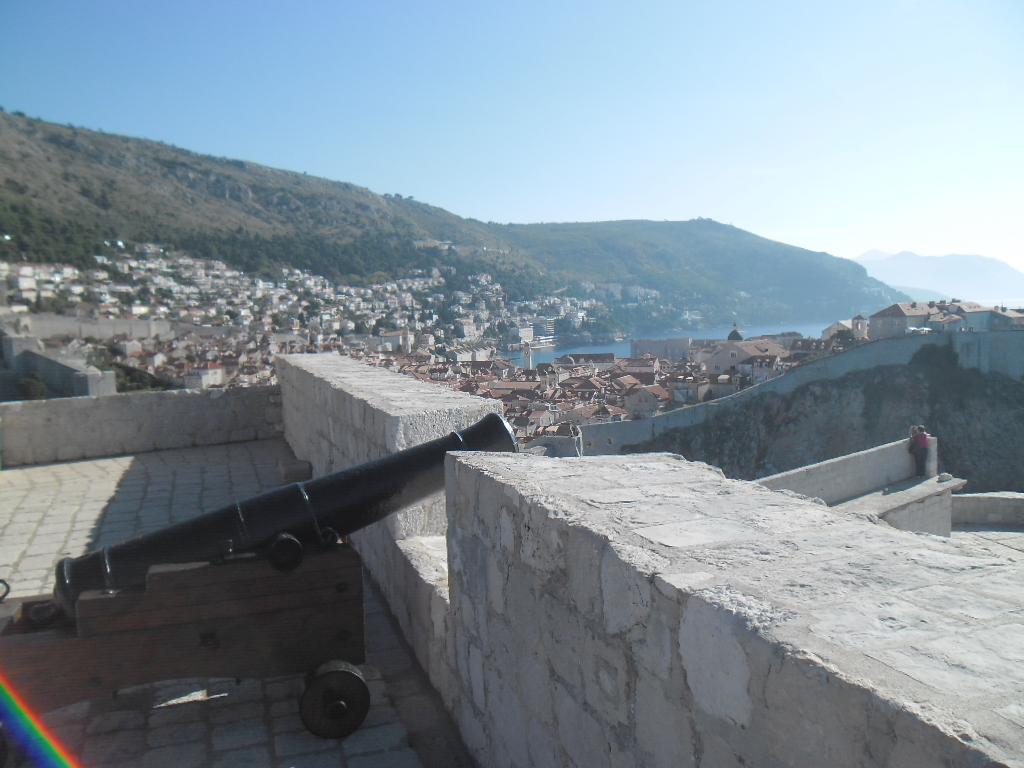

== See also ==
- Walls of Dubrovnik
