= Fitton =

Fitton is a surname of English origin. Notable people with the surname include:

- Alexander Fitton (Baron Fitton of Gawsworth) (c.1630–1698), Irish barrister and judge
- Andrew Fitton (active from 2007), British businessman and football club owner
- Arthur Fitton (1902–84), English footballer and cricketer
- Benjamin Fitton (active from 2006), British singer songwriter
- Darrell Fitton (active from 1994), English electronic musician
- Darryl Fitton (born 1962), English professional darts player
- Dexter Fitton (born 1965), English cricketer
- Doris Fitton (1897–1985), Australian actress and theatrical director
- Edward Fitton the elder (1527–79), Irish provincial governor
- Edward Fitton, the younger (c.1548–1606), English Member of Parliament and administrator in Ireland
- Fitton baronets, a title in the Baronetage of England 1617–43

- Sir Edward Fitton, 1st Baronet (1572–1619)
- Sir Edward Fitton, 2nd Baronet (1603–43)

- Fred Fitton (1905–1965), English footballer
- Hedley Fitton (1859–1929), British engraver and printmaker
- James Fitton (priest) (1805–81), American Catholic missionary
- James Fitton (artist) (1899–1982), English painter
- Laura Fitton (active from 2010), American businesswoman
- Lesley Fitton, British archaeologist and Keeper of the Department of Greece and Rome, the British Museum
- Margaret Fitton (1902–1988), British artist
- Mary Fitton (1578–1647), English gentlewoman, maid of honour to Queen Elizabeth I
- Michael Fitton (1766–1852), British naval officer
- Robin Fitton (1928–70), former Grand Prix motorcycle road racer
- Sarah Mary Fitton (1796–1874), Irish writer who had an interest in botany
- Tom Fitton (active from 1998), American activist, president of Judicial Watch
- William Henry Fitton (1780–1861), Irish physician and amateur geologist

People with the personal name Fitton include:

- Fitton Gerard, 3rd Earl of Macclesfield (1663–1702), British peer

== See also ==
- Field v Fitton, a New Zealand lawsuit of 1988 regarding privity of contract
- Fitton, a fictional airport in the BBC radio series Cabin Pressure
- Fitton End, a hamlet in the vicinity of Gorefield, Cambridgeshire, England
- Fitton Field, a sports stadium in Worcester, Massachusetts, USA
- Fitton Hill, a large housing estate in Oldham in Greater Manchester, England
- Fitton Rock, a sea-rock near Adelaide Island in Antarctica
