= Edward Fitton =

Edward Fitton may refer to:

- Edward Fitton (the elder) (1527–1579), English MP for Cheshire
- Edward Fitton (the younger) (c. 1548–1606), English MP for Wigan
- Sir Edward Fitton, 1st Baronet (1572–1619), of the Fitton baronets
- Sir Edward Fitton, 2nd Baronet (1603–1643), of the Fitton baronets

== See also ==
- Fitton (disambiguation)
