= James Fitton =

James Fitton may refer to:

- James Fitton (artist) (1899–1982), English painter
- James Fitton (priest) (1805–1881), American Catholic missionary
