= Shrule =

Village in County Mayo, Ireland

Shrule Irish: Sruthair
- Village
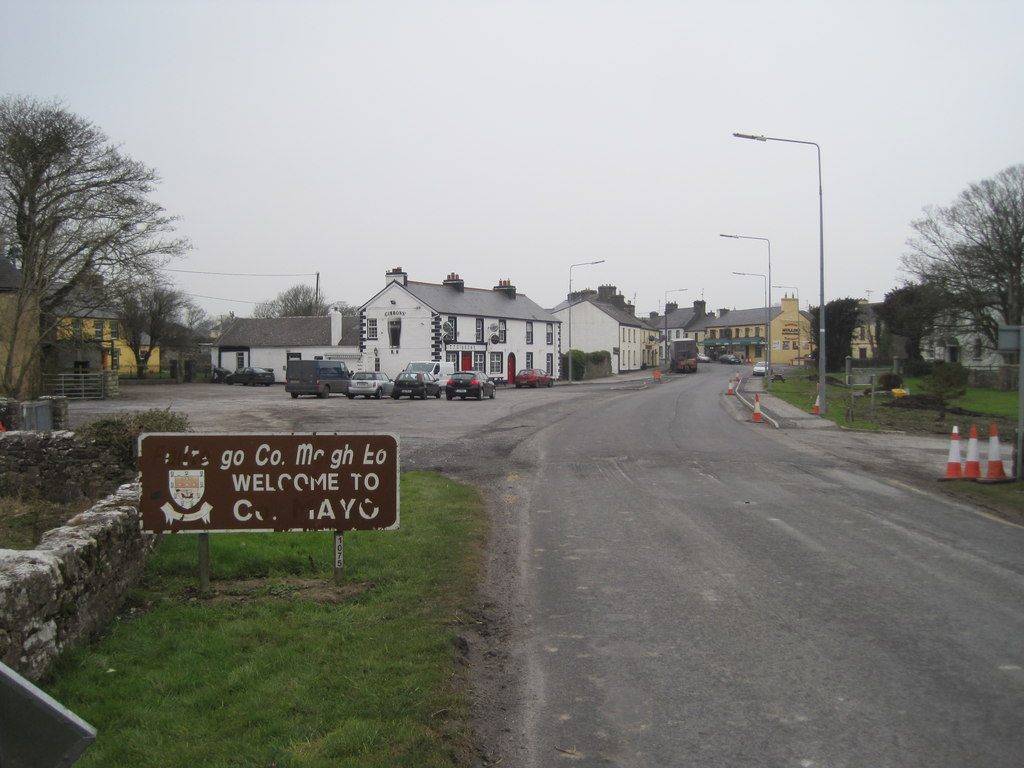
- Entering Shrule on the N84 (from the Galway side)

- Location in Ireland
- Coordinates: 53°31′14″N 9°05′19″W
- Country: Ireland
- Province: Connacht
- County: County Mayo
- Elevation: 64 m (210 ft)

Population (2016)
  - Total: 432
- Time zone: UTC+0 (WET)
  - Summer (DST): UTC-1 (IST (WEST))
- Irish Grid Reference: M2853

Shrule (Irish: Sruthair, also anglicised to Shruel, usage deprecated) is a village in County Mayo in Ireland. It is in the south-east of Mayo, near the County Galway border. The boundary between counties Mayo and Galway follows much of the course of the Black River which runs on the south side of the village.

The village is 27 km north of Galway city on the N84 road, and is on several bus routes. It is in a civil parish of the same name.

The ruin of Shrule Castle, a fortification built by the Norman de Burgo family, dominates the view of the village as approached from the Galway side. Although there is a gate to get into it, the ruin is unsafe and closed to the public.

== History ==
=== 1570 battle of Shrule ===
Connacht in the 1570s was divided between English control and Irish clans and families. The two branches of the Burke family, the MacWillams of Mayo and the Clanricardes of Galway, held a lot of territory and influence. The two branches fought with each other and with neighbouring clans, leading to the Elizabethian Lord Deputy of Ireland Henry Sidney to appoint a new Lord President to the province, Edward Fitton, to regain control. After breaking out from a siege in Galway, he besieged Shrule Castle with the support of Richard Burke, Earl of Clanricarde.

On the 21st of June, the MacWilliam Burkes and their allies provoked a set-piece battle against the besieging forces. Fitton was dug in around the castle, and the MacWillams lined up their infantry and dismounted cavalry uphill from the defences. Fitton refused to budge from behind the siegeworks, so the enemy decided to attack. They pushed through the cannon and musket fire, hitting the besiegers with momentum. The besiegers broke and started to run for their camp a few miles away. The MacWilliam infantry followed closely to push their advantage, but this allowed Fitton and his cavalry to get behind them and attack the usually exposed rear. However, the MacWilliams held their shape in the face of this onslaught, until their own cavalry could pour in. A very tough fight broke out.

Fitton was badly injured in the face, and his troop's ammunition was beginning to give out. He was rescued when the MacWilliams disengaged and marched northwards from the field in formation. The battle was inconclusive, the Mac Williams caused more casualties but did not remain in place to benefit strategically. Fitton could later take Shrule castle and slaughter the defending garrison.

The castle afterwards passed into the possession of William Burke of the Clanricharde Burkes.

=== 1642 massacre of Protestant refugees ===
On 18 February 1642, during the Irish Confederate Wars that followed the Irish Rebellion of 1641, a number of English settlers, including John Maxwell, the Protestant bishop of Killala, surrendered to Confederate Irish rebels at Castlebar in the hope of saving their lives.

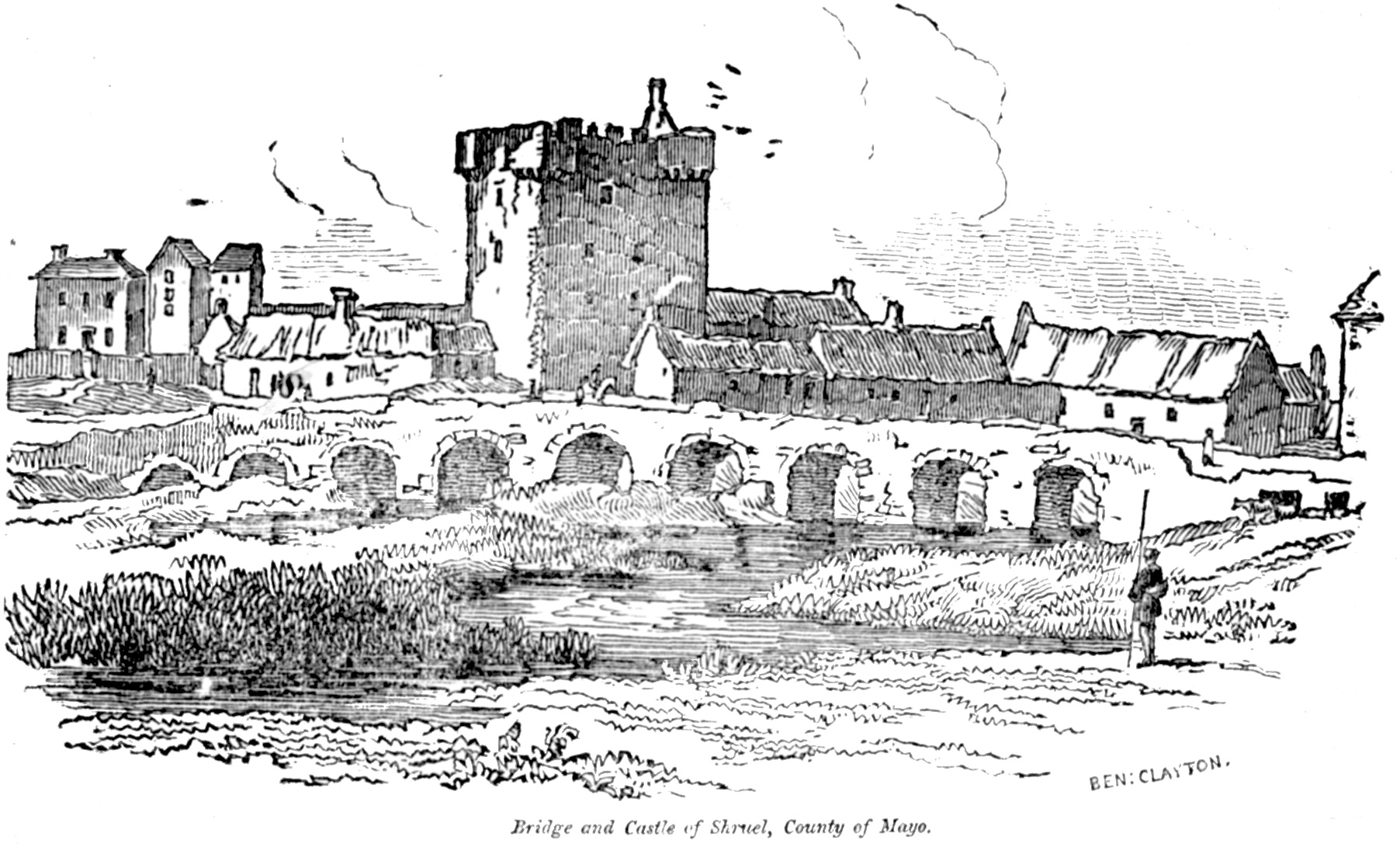
Depiction of Shrule from an 1833 edition of the Dublin Penny Journal

After staying at Shrule Castle in the company of Miles Bourke, 2nd Viscount Mayo, Sheriff of County Mayo, for more than a week, the group was given an escort with orders to take them 14 miles toward the border of County Mayo and County Galway, where other forces would assume the escort duty and take them on to the Galway fort. After provisioning the Maxwell family with horses, Lord Mayo set out for Cong. Mayo handed over his prisoners at Shrule, on the border, as his authority only existed in County Mayo. Edmond Bourke, an Irish soldier who led the escort duty, and a cousin of Lord Mayo, then ordered their troops to begin killing their settler charges. Estimates of the dead ranged from less than 30 to as many as 65. Survivors were taken to Headford by monks from Ross Errilly. Though Mayo's son Theobald tried to save some prisoners, and had to be driven away, he was executed in 1653 by a Parliamentarian inquiry for complicity in the killings that was held after the Cromwellian conquest of Ireland.

== Religion ==
Saint Joseph's Church in Shrule is a Roman Catholic church in the Diocese of Galway, Kilmacduagh and Kilfenora.

== Education ==
The village has one pre-school, one primary school, and no second-level school. Second-level students usually attend Presentation College Headford which is seven kilometres away in Headford.

== Sports ==
The local Gaelic Athletic Association (GAA) club, Shrule-Glencorrib GAA, is associated with Shrule and nearby Glencorrib.

== Notable people ==
- Conor Mortimer, Gaelic football manager and former player
- Christopher O'Dowd, native of Shrule, was an original member of the Special Air Service British regiment
