= Fitton baronets =

English family

- Escutcheon of the Fitton baronets of Gawsworth
- Creation date: 1617
- Status: extinct
- Extinction date: 1643
- Seat: Gawsworth Old Hall

The Fitton Baronetcy, of Gawsworth in the County of Chester, was a title in the Baronetage of England. It was created on 2 October 1617 by James I for Sir Edward Fitton, of Gawsworth Hall, Gawsworth, Cheshire, 1572–1619. The Fitton family were settled in Gawsworth from about the 13th century. The first Baronet's ancestors included Sir Edward Fitton (1500–1553), High Sheriff of Cheshire in 1544 and Sir Edward Fitton (1527–1579), Treasurer of Ireland and President of Connaught. His father Sir Edward Fitton (1548–1606) was an unsuccessful colonist of Munster. His sister, Mary Fitton, was Maid of Honour to Elizabeth I.

The second Baronet, High Sheriff in 1633, was an officer in the service of Charles II and was briefly Governor of Bristol following that city's fall during the English Civil War. The baronetcy became extinct on his death in 1643. He left his estate by his will of 1641 to his Irish cousin William Fitton of Awne (Awrice), County Limerick, (grandson of Sir Edward Fitton, Treasurer of Ireland) to the exclusion of his seven sisters and their husbands. The will was disputed and lengthy legal proceedings followed involving Alexander Fitton, Lord Chancellor of Ireland (son of William) and Charles Gerard, 1st Baron Gerard, son of Penelope Fitton, eldest daughter of the first Baronet. Settlement of the lawsuit in 1663 passed the estate to Gerard, who was later created Earl of Macclesfield.

== Fitton baronets, of Gawsworth (1617) ==
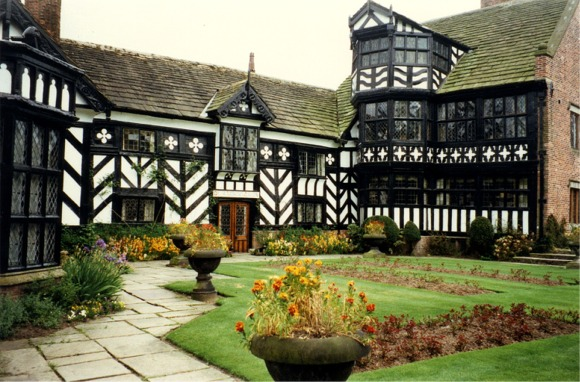
Gawsworth Old Hall, the seat of the Fitton family

- Sir Edward Fitton, 1st Baronet (1572–1619)
- Sir Edward Fitton, 2nd Baronet (1603–1643)

Baronetage of England
Preceded by Clarke baronets	Fitton baronets 2 October 1617	Succeeded by Lucy baronets
