= Roger Mainwaring =

Roger Mainwaring may refer to:

- Roger Maynwaring (c. 1589/1590–1653), bishop in the Church of England
- Roger Mainwaring (judge) (died 1590), English-born judge and in Ireland
