= Shrule Castle =

Abandoned tower house in Ireland

- Shrule, County Mayo, Ireland
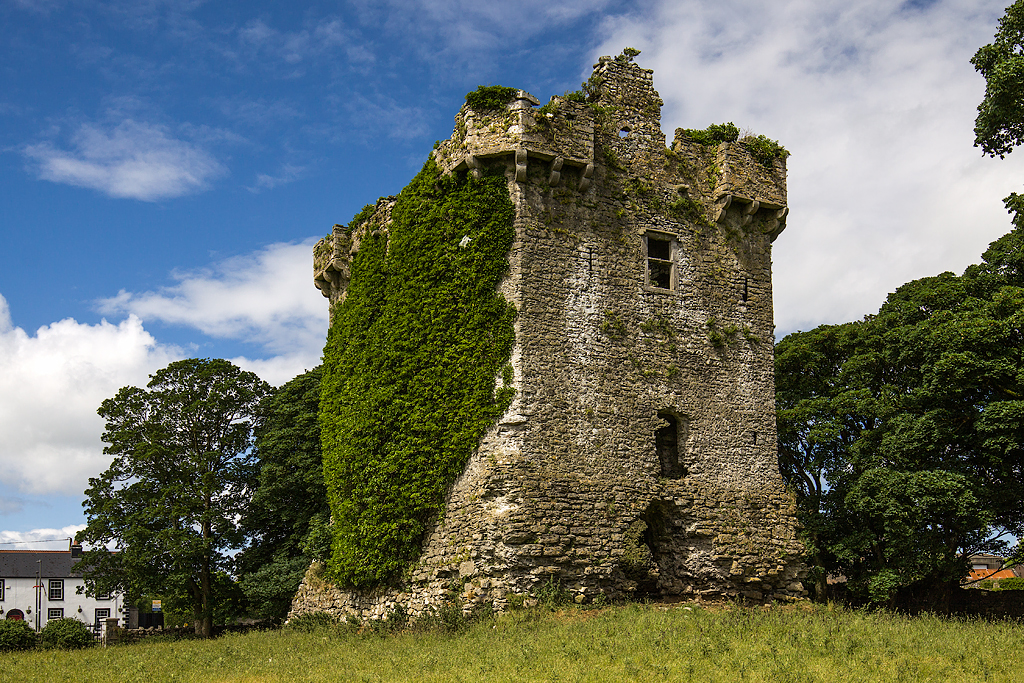
- The remains of the castle today.

Site information
- Type: Tower House
- Owner: Private
- Condition: Ruined

Location
- Coordinates: 53°31′10″N 9°05′09″W

Site history
- Built: c. 1238
- Built by: de Burgh family

Shrule Castle (Irish: Caisleán Sruthair, meaning 'Castle of the River') is a ruined tower house near Shrule in County Mayo, Ireland. The castle was built c.1238, near the Black River at the County Mayo and County Galway border by the de Burgh family. It was given to John de Burgh in 1308 by his father Richard Óg de Burgh, 2nd Earl of Ulster.

== History ==
The castle was captured in 1570 by a strong force led by Sir Edward Fitton, President of Connaught and Vice Treasurer of Ireland, the force mainly consisted of the McDonnells of Knocknacloy's gallowglass warriors. Mac William Uachtar, Lord of Thomond, the de Burghs of Mayo and McDonnells of Mayo led a force to retake the castle, however they did not succeed. The chief of the McDonnells of Knocknacloy Calvagh McDonnell was killed on 18 June 1570 and during the battle Edward Fitton was unhorsed and severely wounded in the face.

William Burke occupied the castle, and passed it to his son John Burke in 1574. In 1610, Richard Burke, 4th Earl of Clanricarde leased the castle and lands to Pierce Lynch of Galway.

The tower house and its field are used to keep sheep now.
