= Ross Errilly Friary =

Ruined Franciscan friary in Galway, Ireland

- Mainistir an Rois
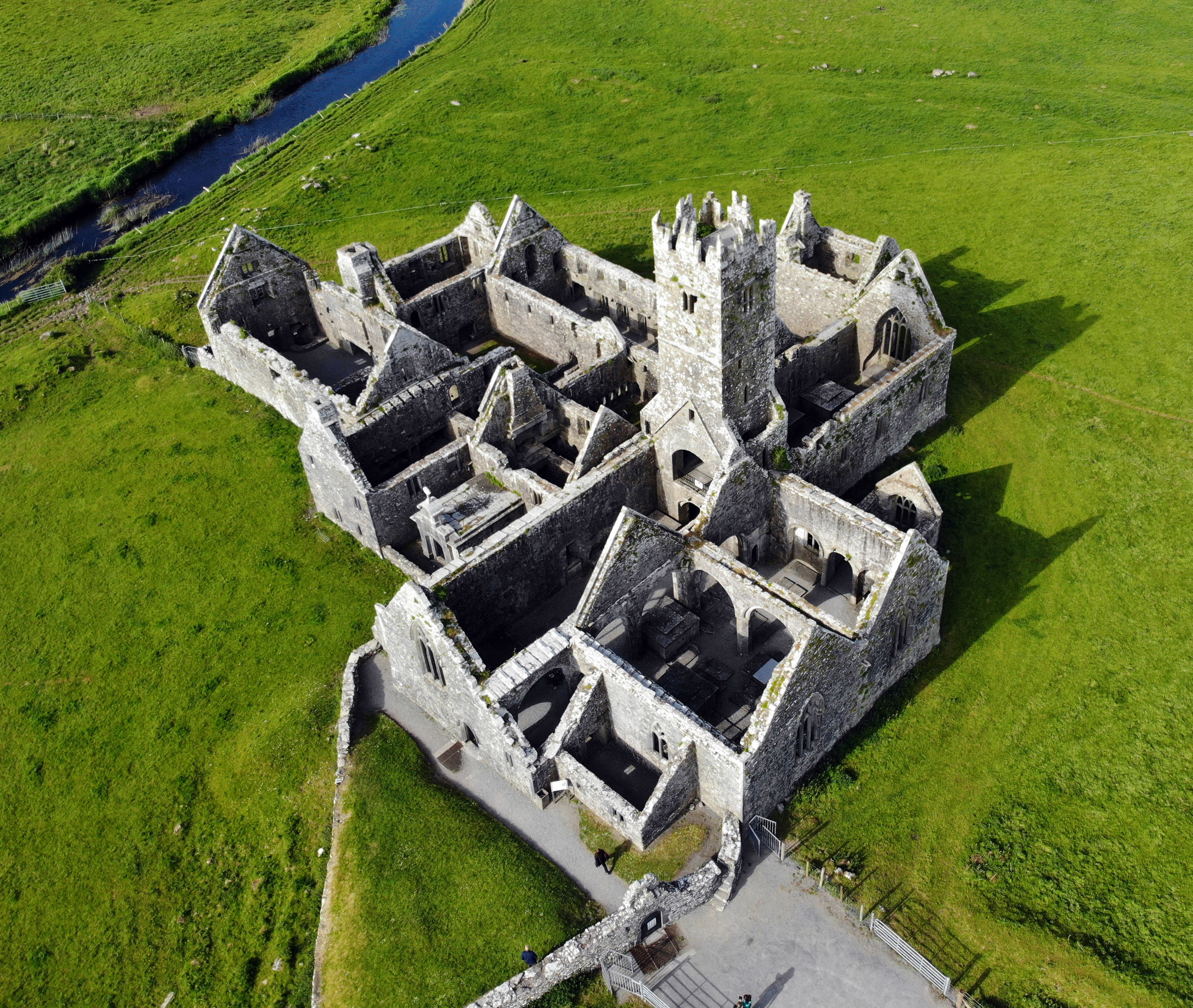
- Ruins of the Ross Errilly Friary
- Interactive map of Ross Errilly Friary

Monastery information
- Order: Franciscans
- Established: c.1460

Architecture
- Status: Inactive

Site
- Coordinates: 53°28′47″N 9°7′54″W
- Public access: Yes

The Ross Errilly Friary (Irish: Mainistir an Rois, often anglicised in 18th and 19th century sources as Rosserelly) is a medieval Franciscan friary located on the Black River about a mile to the northwest of Headford, County Galway, Ireland. It is a National Monument of Ireland and among the best-preserved medieval monastic sites in the country. Though usually referred to by locals as "Ross Abbey," this is not technically correct as the community never had an abbot.

The church and bell tower are to the south of a small but well preserved central cloister, with domestic buildings to the north. Amongst these are a kitchen (equipped with an oven and a water tank for live fish), a bake house, and a refectory or dining area. The dormitories are on the upper levels. One unusual feature is a second courtyard or cloister, built to accommodate the friary's growing population.

Like many other abandoned Christian sites in Ireland, Ross Errilly has continued to be used as a burial ground by area residents. In addition to tombs that date from the friary's active period, many graves dating from the 18th through 20th centuries can be found inside the church walls. In some cases, tombstones comprise the floors of walkways and crawlspaces.

== History ==
=== Foundation ===
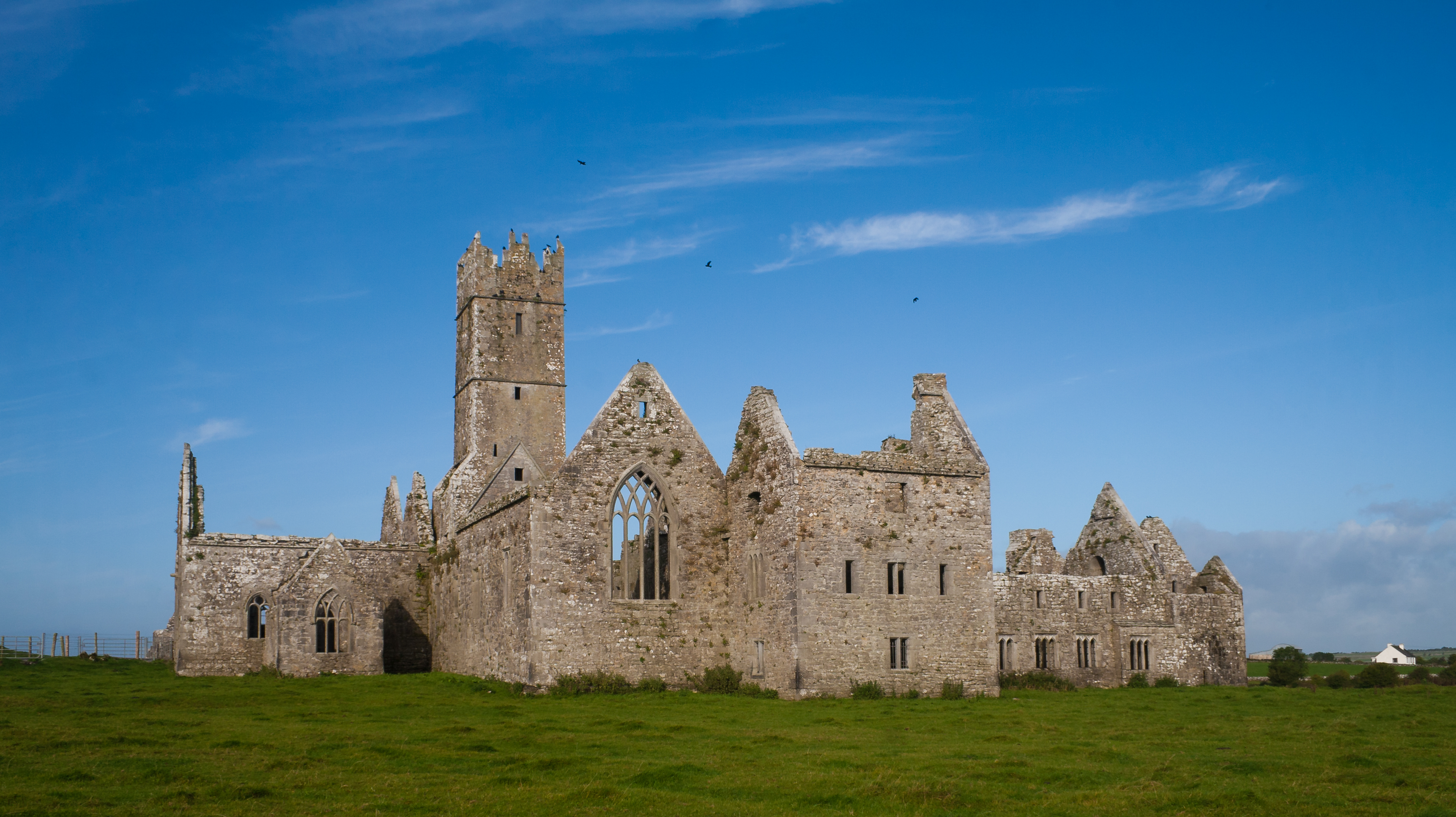
Ross Errilly Friary

Both Luke Wadding and the Four Masters (who refer to Ross Errilly in their Annals as Ros-Oirbhealagh) record that the abbey was founded in 1351, but this date has been called into question by numerous historians. Architectural cues and documentary evidence have given rise to a modern consensus that the friary was founded sometime in the middle of the 15th century, perhaps around 1460. The earliest existing documentary evidence however comes from a reference to the friary in the will of Galway man John Blake, son of Henry, who bequeathed the sum of 40 pence to the friary in 1469. In any case, it is clear from the architectural evidence that any religious building that may have been on the site prior to that time was greatly expanded during the 15th century. Around 1473, a delegation of Franciscans from Ross Errilly went to Donegal at the request of the Tyrconnell clan and founded the Donegal Friary, where the Four Masters would later write their famous Annals.

=== After the English Reformation ===
Life at Ross Errilly was disrupted by the English Reformation. The Franciscans had loudly opposed King Henry VIII's break with Rome, which would prove costly after the schism. In 1538, English authorities imprisoned two hundred of the monks and banished or killed an indeterminate number of others. The rest of the Franciscans' history at Ross Errilly would be marked by repeated evictions and other persecutions.

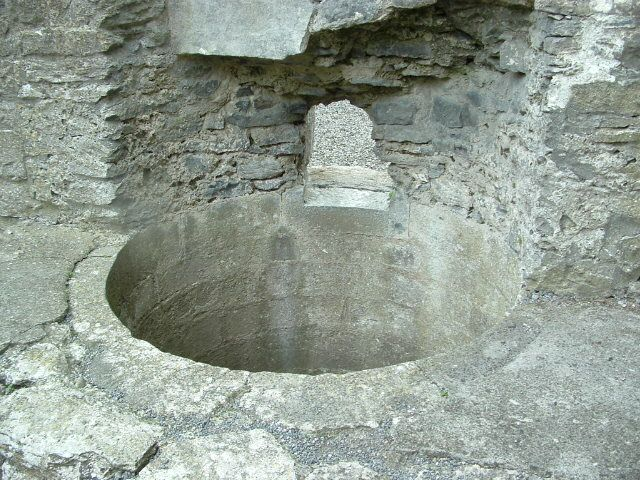
This tank was used to hold live fish caught from the nearby Black River.

At the beginning of the reign of Queen Elizabeth I, the abbey was confiscated and given to Richard Burgh, the 2nd Earl of Clanrickarde. Burgh, a descendant of the de Burghs who had helped found the abbey, quietly gave it back to the Franciscans. In 1572, an enclosing ditch and wall were constructed around the friary.

In 1584, the English crown again confiscated the monastery from the Franciscans and gave it to an English noble who evicted the monks and plundered the building's contents. In 1586, the Earl of Clanrickarde purchased the monastery and again returned it to the Franciscans.

By the end of the century, however, the crown had once again expelled the monks (the Monks were expelled a total of seven times) and converted the monastery into an English garrison for use during the Nine Years' War.

In 1604, Ulick Burke, 3rd Earl of Clanrickarde, continuing to honour the de Burgh tradition of supporting Ross Errilly, financed the rehabilitation and reoccupation of the monastery by the Franciscans. Their stay was short-lived; in 1612 Lord Arthur Chichester, Lord Deputy of Ireland, ordered the Protestant archbishop of Tuam, William Daniel, to expel the monks and to demolish the abbey's altars. Daniel apparently complied with the order, but sent advance word to the residents of Ross Errilly and advised them to evacuate the abbey's most precious items.

In 1626, the monks returned to Ross Errilly and enjoyed a quarter-century of relative peace. Records of the OFM in Ireland indicate that the community at this time consisted of just six priests and two brothers. One piece of evidence for the friary's occupancy during this period is a handwritten testimonium, dated 27 November 1636, and signed by a Boetius Mac Egan, then a prelate in residence at the friary.

=== Rebellion and the Cromwellian era ===
On 18 February 1642, Ulick Burke and the monks were involved in the rescue of about 40 Protestant refugees of the 1641 uprising, including the family of Dr. John Maxwell, the Protestant bishop of Killala. The refugees were being led from the town of Shrule when the Catholic soldiers comprising their escort massacred them. It's not reliably known how many were killed, but one estimate placed the number of victims at 65. Burke and the monks brought the survivors back to the Headford area and obtained shelter for them among the townspeople until safe passage to England could be arranged.

The Irish campaigns of Oliver Cromwell brought an end to this era of English tolerance of the Catholic Church in Ireland. For a few nervous years, Ross Errilly served as an informal refugee shelter for Catholic clergy who had been flushed out of other parts of Ireland by Cromwell's forces.

On 10 August 1656, Cromwellian forces finally made their way to Ross Errilly. The 140 Franciscans living there had fled a few hours earlier, but the soldiers ransacked the grounds, destroying crosses and other religious iconography and even defiling tombs in search of loot. Legend maintains that the fleeing monks somehow found the time to remove the bell from the bell tower and sink it in the nearby Black River, where it remains today. The English Restoration in 1660 brought Charles II to the throne. His nominally tolerant policies towards Catholics allowed the reoccupation and repair of the abbey in 1664.

=== Final years ===
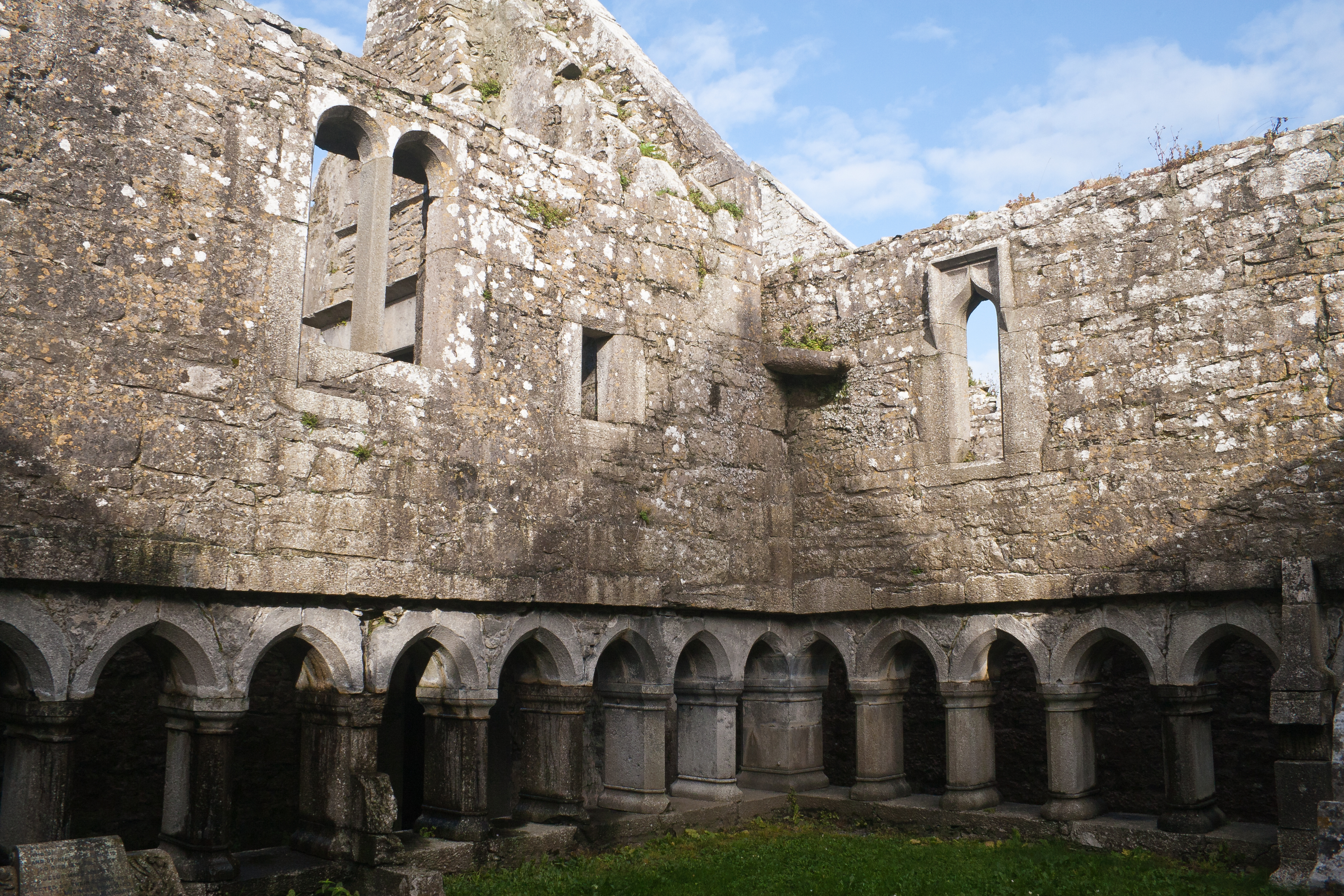
Cloister

The Glorious Revolution of 1688, which deposed Charles' younger brother, the Catholic James II, eventually led to the Popery Act 1698, which placed a bounty on Catholic clergy. Once again, the Franciscans of Ross Errilly became fugitives and abandoned the premises.

Local records indicate that by 1712, Franciscans had returned to the abbey. Some sources indicate that the abbey was abandoned again in 1731, for reasons which are unclear. What's certain is that by 1753, they had returned to the site. The property was now owned by Lord St. George, a local noble, who picked up where the Clanrickardes had left off and secretly patronised the abbey. By this time, the penal laws were in effect and St. George risked life imprisonment by supporting the monks. A vengeful family who had lost a lawsuit to St. George reported to the authorities that he was sheltering Catholic religious at the monastery. St. George learned of the accusations and the monks evacuated the monastery for the last time. Before authorities arrived at the abbey, St. George had the abbey's interior whitewashed and had employed a group of weavers and their looms inside the building. The inquiry was ended without further incident, but the sham factory was soon closed and the monks never returned again.

The monks built cabins of wood and stone on a small island in the Black River, about one mile (1.6 km) downstream from the abbey. The island (which no longer exists) was known informally as "Friars Island," and the community supported the monks with food, fuel and clothing via a wooden drawbridge. For 36 years, the monks continued to celebrate Sunday Mass in the deteriorating abbey building. In 1789, a Henry Lynch of Ballycurrin cheaply leased 16 acres (65,000 m^{2}) to the dispossessed monks at the foot of a hill in the townland of Kilroe, near Headford. By 1801, only three monks remained, though Mass continued to be said at Kilroe until 1804. There were still three monks in the community when it was closed in 1832.

=== Abandonment and neglect ===
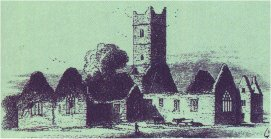
The abbey ruins as depicted in William Wilde's 1867 book, Lough Corrib, Its Shores and Islands.

In the meantime, the long-abandoned friary continued its descent into ruin. In 1835, English tourist John Barrow described the abbey as "a remarkably fine old ruin ... in a disgracefully neglected state." In particular, Barrow was astonished by the large amount of unburied human remains at the site, which included "moss-grown skulls and human thigh and leg-bones strewed about so plentifully that not a step can be taken without encountering them." Geographer Samuel Lewis noted the continued decay in 1837, writing that the abbey was "partially covered in ivy" and that the roof had collapsed in 1812. Despite the neglect, Lewis was able to report that "one of the windows is still perfect".

William Wilde visited the abbey ruins in July 1866. Like Barrow, he described "heaps of skulls and bones" in the church and claimed that the site had become notorious for its unburied remains. Wilde noted with dismay that further "desecration" was being effected by sheep and cattle, which roamed freely through the ruins. He also credited a nearby resident, Oliver Burke, with some early efforts to preserve the site by "removing obstructions from between the mullions of the beautiful windows" and making "repairs to the tower, thereby rendering it accessible to the top." In 1868, Burke, a barrister by profession, wrote his own account of the friary's history.

=== Modern use ===
Today, the ruin of Ross Errilly is maintained by the Office of Public Works and is open to the public free of charge.

It has been used as a filming location for The Quiet Man (1952), the TV series Reign (2013), and films like Moving Target (2000) , The Suicide Club and Bad Karma (2002).

== See also ==
- List of abbeys and priories in Ireland (County Galway)

== Footnotes ==
=== References ===
- Mooney, Canice (1960), "The Friary of Ross: Foundation and Early Years", Journal of the Galway Archaeological and Historical Society, 29: 7–14
- Stalley, Roger (2003), "The End of the Middle Ages: Gothic Survival in Sixteenth-Century Connacht", The Journal of the Royal Society of Antiquaries of Ireland, 133: 5–23
