= County Ground (Swindon) =

Football stadium in Wiltshire, England

The County Ground
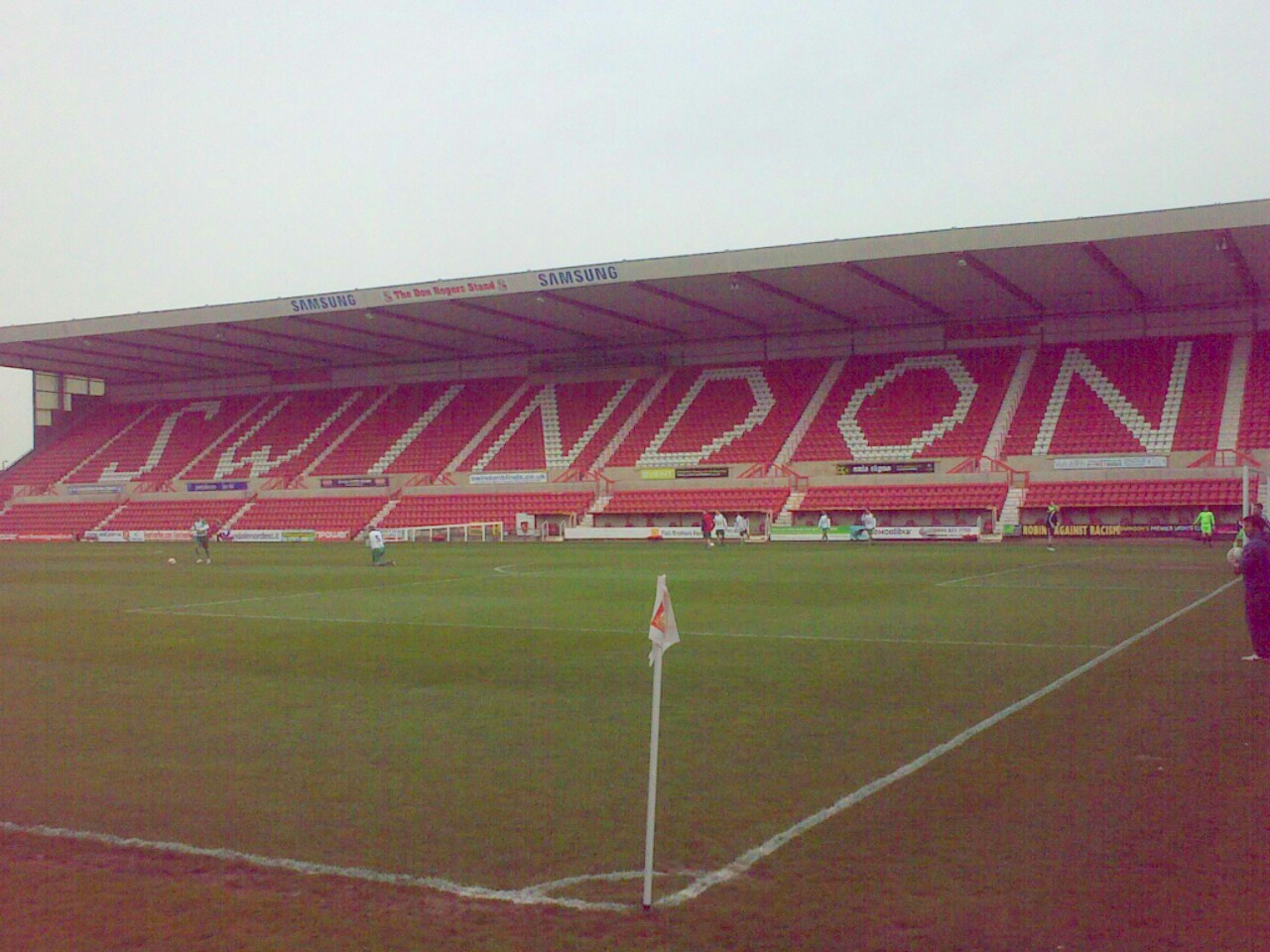
- Don Rogers Stand in 2014
- Interactive map of The County Ground
- Address: County Road; Swindon; SN1 2ED
- Coordinates: 51°33′52″N 1°46′14″W
- Owner: Swindon Town (50%) & TrustSTFC (50%)
- Operator: Swindon Town
- Capacity: 14,753
- Surface: Grass
- Field size: 110 by 70 yards (100.6 m × 64.0 m)

Construction
- Built: 1890
- Opened: 1892

The County Ground, known as The Nigel Eady County Ground from the 2024-25 season, is a football stadium located in Swindon, Wiltshire, England, and has been home to Swindon Town Football Club since 1896. It has an all-seated capacity of 14,753 currently, which has been the same level since the mid-1990s. A record attendance of 32,000 was set on 15 January 1972 against Arsenal in the third round of the FA Cup. North of the football stadium is Swindon Cricket Club, with their pitch also named The County Ground, following its use by the football club from 1893 until 1896.

== History ==
Thomas Arkell of Arkell's Brewery donated £300 to finance the construction of a stand on what was then known as the Wiltshire County Ground; this investment was enough to begin development of a purpose-built football stadium. Since its original construction, the ground has been periodically updated with new features or fittings. A covered stand on the Shrivenham Road side was erected in 1932, it was replaced in 1960 with one obtained second hand from Aldershot Military Tattoo. At a cost of £4,300 a roof was erected over the Town End, this was raised by the supporters' club, and was opened on 27 August 1938 by local MP W.W. Wakefield.

The War Department took over the ground in 1940, where for a while POWs were housed in huts placed on the pitch. For this the club received compensation of £4,570 in 1945.

The addition of floodlights in 1951, at a cost of £350, gave Swindon the honour of being the first League club to do so. These were first used against Bristol City on 2 April 1951, ahead of Arsenal by six months. These original set of lights were supplemented by lights on both side stand roofs, which were sufficient for the County Ground to stage its first floodlit league match on 29 February 1956 v Millwall, seven days after Fratton Park became the first ground to stage a floodlit league fixture. The present pylons date from 1960. In 1963, the Italian architect Pier Luigi Nervi, who had been responsible for stadia in Florence and Rome, was commissioned to design a replacement for the North Stand. However, his futuristic plan was never realised due to the high construction cost and the club's relegation.

Additions included the building of the "new" all-seater Arkell's Stand in 1971 (behind the original) and following the Hillsborough disaster; the County Ground was converted to an all-seater stadium, beginning with the addition of extra seating in front of the North Stand and the building of a sponsored stand (originally the Intel Stand, then the Nationwide Stand and now the Don Rogers Stand) in the early 1990s. The Nationwide Stand replaced the Shrivenham Road enclosure, a two-tiered terrace. In its last years, due to safety concerns, the upper tier was used by television cameras and for crowd monitoring purposes only.

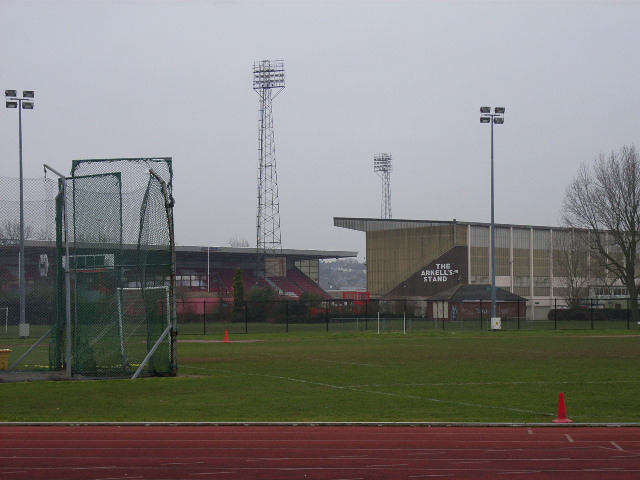
The County Ground and adjacent Athletics ground

A Rolex clock is located at the rear of the Stratton Bank stand, next to the scoreboard. Erected in 1963 following the club's promotion to the Second Division, it is the only Rolex clock to be found at any football stadium in the world.

The ground itself is on land previously owned by Swindon Borough Council to which the club had paid rent. In 2006 a redevelopment campaign for the County Ground began, with the club and TrustSTFC (the supporters' trust) raising a petition to Save Our Home urging the council to "facilitate the redevelopment of the stadium and do everything they can to keep the club within the borough", including the proposed upgrading of the adjacent cricket club to county standard and athletic club to Olympic standard.

On 24 March 2023, Swindon Town bought the County Ground for £2.3 million, with them giving fans the opportunity to own a percentage of the ground.

== Future developments ==
In 2008, Swindon Town's owners released a ten-point plan after they took over the club in January. Outlining future plans for the County Ground. In this ten-point plan various upgrades to the current ground were noted. The club plans to have only red and white seats to unify the seating and make the stadium look more up to date. The club also plan to improve disabled access and the playing surface. The current owners of Swindon Town also hope to commence with a ground redevelopment at the County Ground site or new stadium for Swindon Town, hence the reasons for minor modifications until a new stadium becomes a reality.

Relocation was first proposed around the year 2000, but since then redevelopment appears to have been the preferred option.

In September 2009 Swindon Town announced that the County Ground would be redeveloped into a 25,000-seater stadium ready for the 2012-13 season. Had Bristol become a World Cup host city, it had been hoped that international teams would use the County Ground as a training ground in 2018 or 2022. However, England's bid to host the World Cup failed in December 2010.

In January 2011, revised plans were announced, to expand the stadium capacity to 19,000 by rebuilding the town end to a 4,000-seater stand, putting a roof over the Stratton Bank, putting executive boxes in the Don Rogers Stand, then finally refurbishing the Arkell's Stand with a technology park built behind for more income. It was also suggested that in the future, if needs be, the stadium could be increased to hold 25,000. This proposition was chosen due to the increased financial viability and sustainability for the future. The land which the county ground is on would also be bought in the process.

These plans, however, were delayed due to Swindon Town's relegation to League Two at the end of the 2005–06, 2010–11 and 2016–17 seasons.

Talks with the council resurrected again in 2021 when Clem Morfuni took control of the club and restarted plans to buy the County Ground in a joint venture with the supporters' trust. On 16 March 2022 Swindon Borough Council confirmed it would sell the stadium to the joint venture. Early plans included a £22.5m redevelopment project including a refurbished Stratton Bank, executive boxes in the Don Rogers Stand and a new Town End with a conference centre and hotel. Work is expected to be completed by 2027. On 21 March 2022 the council officially approved the sale of the stadium to the joint venture. Finalisation of legal documentation to complete the sale was expected to be completed in May/June 2022. However, completion of the sale took several further months, through to the end of January 2023.

== Current stands ==
=== Arkell's John Trollope stand ===
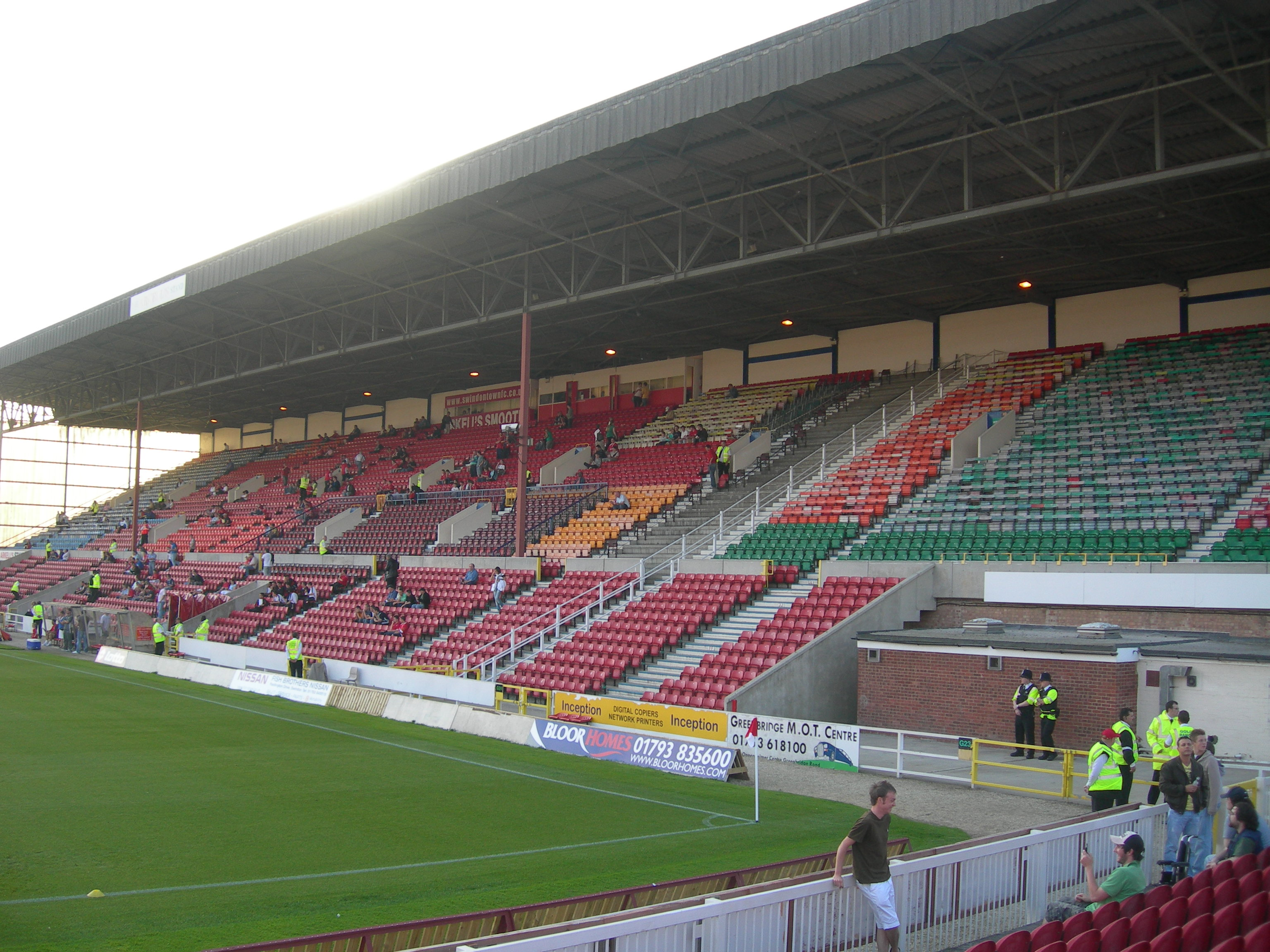
The Arkell's stand in July 2007. The entire away support was kept in the Stratton Bank on this occasion

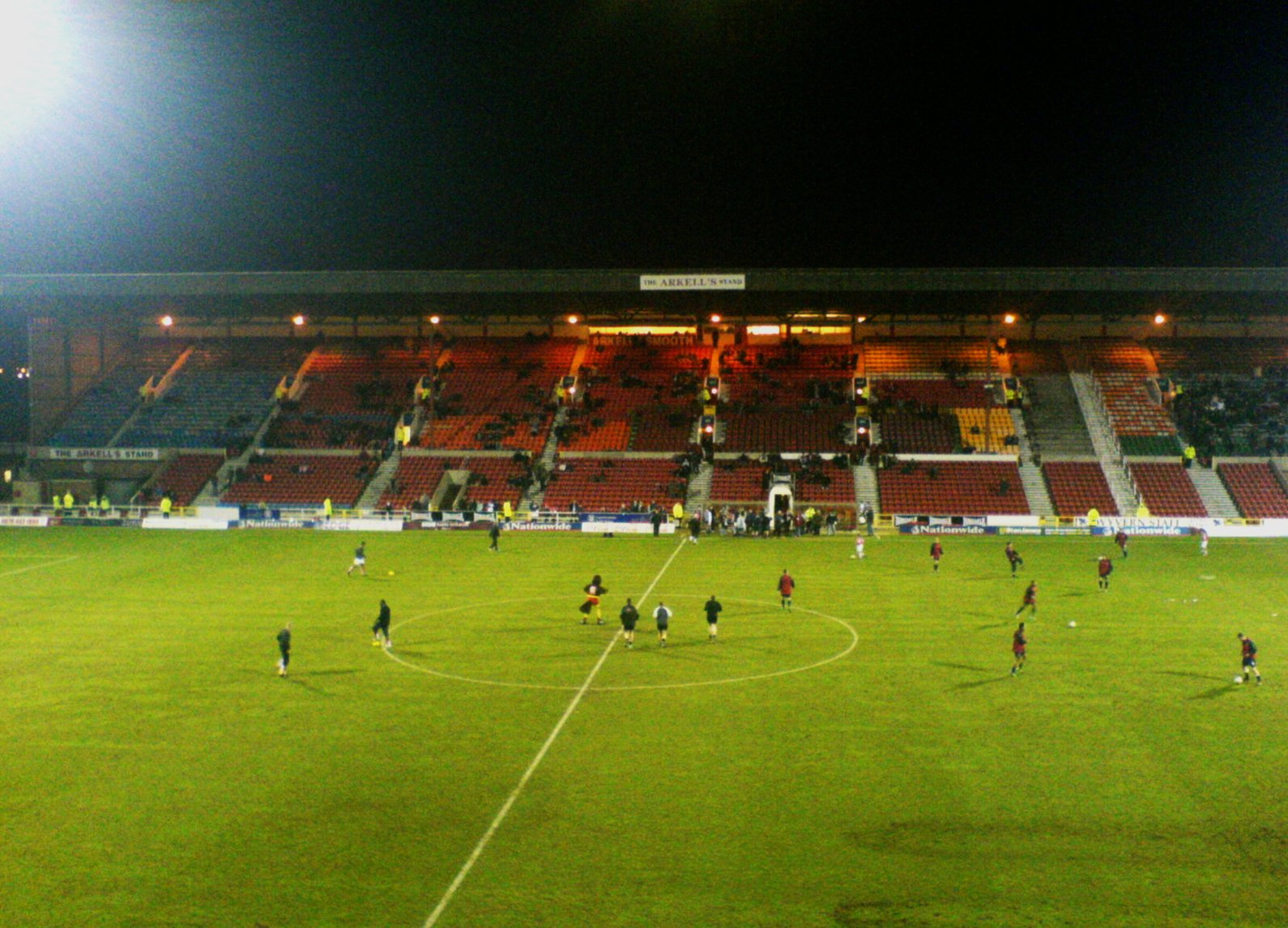
Arkell's stand

Located on the north side of pitch. The majority of this stand was constructed in 1971, with extra seating being added near the pitch side in late 1992. At either end of the stand are large windshields, and there are two roof-supporting beams within the stand. It contains an executive seating area, VIP lounge, the players' dressing rooms and a tunnel out onto the pitch. It is named after Thomas Arkell of Arkell's Brewery, which funded the original Arkell's Stand. The east corner of this stand is allocated to away fans. 1,200 of the total 3,300 away allocation is here. This stand has undergone a facelift, with multiple-coloured seats replaced with red or white seats to give the stand a cleaner, more up-to-date look.

It also is home to the two new dugouts which were built during the facelift. The stand will be thoroughly refurbished during County Ground's future developments.

In August 2021, the club renamed the stand after former club player John Trollope

It has a capacity of roughly 5,800.

=== Stratton Bank ===
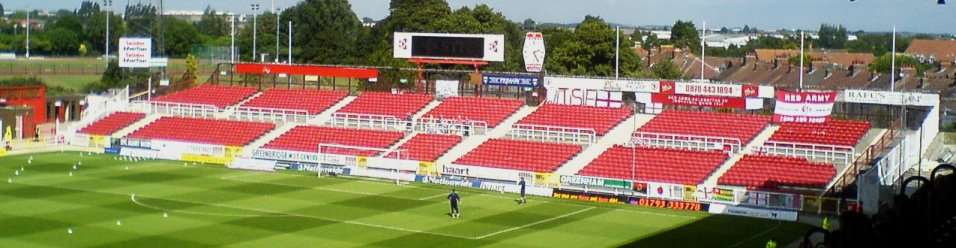
The Stratton Bank on a sunny match day in August 2006

This is at the east end of the pitch. It is a former terrace, now with seats bolted on, and has no roof. Although planning permission was granted to build a roof on the stand, due to the club's financial plight at the time the necessary funds were not available. The Stratton Bank stand makes up the remaining 2,200 of the away allocation, but is only really needed for big games (local derbies, big league, or cup games) or for larger clubs with big away support. The 1,200 in the Arkell's Stand is usually more than adequate. The stadium scoreboard is located at the back of this stand. A notable feature is a large Rolex clock adjacent to the scoreboard which is owned by Deacon's Jewellers, the only one in the world as part of a football stadium.

On 28 February 2009, to mark the 40th anniversary of Swindon Town's victory in the 1969 League Cup, the club announced it would be holding a competition to rename Stratton Bank to whatever the winner chose for the 2009/10 and 2010/11 seasons. The winner, the Adkins Family Stand, was announced on Sky TV's Soccer AM show on 2 May 2009, with the draw being completed by then-Swindon Town chairman Andrew Fitton.

=== Don Rogers Stand ===
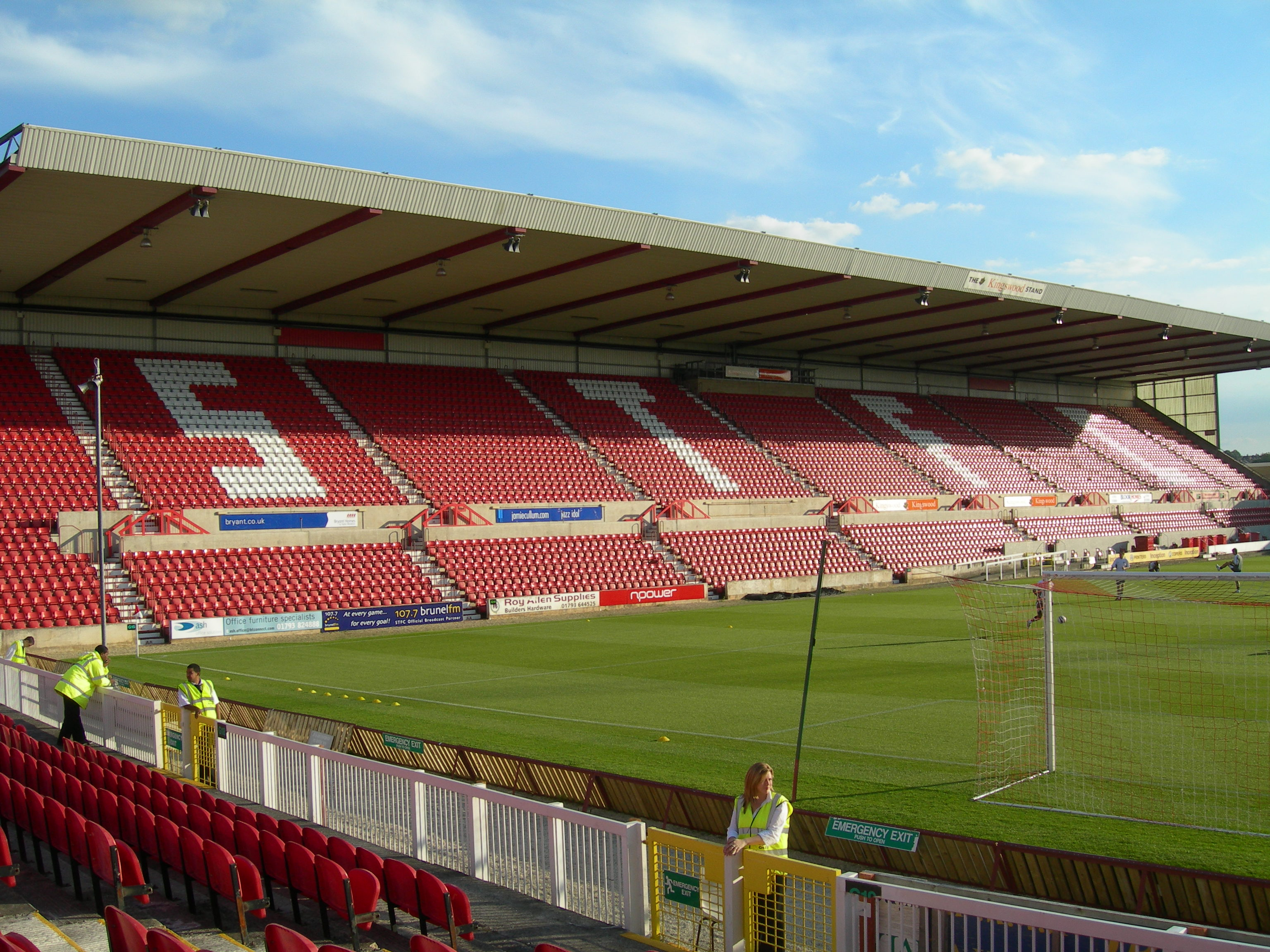
The stand in July 2007 (then the Kingswood stand)

This stand, on the south of the pitch was built in 1994 as the Intel Stand. It then was sponsored by the Nationwide Building Society until the end of the 2006/07 season, and then it was sponsored by the Kingswood Group until March 2008. It is sometimes referred to as the South Stand by supporters. It features a cantilevered roof, which means there are no roof supports obstructing the view of the game. It replaced an old two-tier stand named the Old Shrivenham Road Stand, of which the upper tier had become unusable due to structural problems.

There is a second concourse inside the stand which can be opened and used as a second executive area to the ground. If some seats were removed, this would allow the club to use this concourse to add executive boxes to the County Ground. It is understood this concourse has never been opened due to the lack of funds Swindon Town have had over the last 10 years.

On 14 April 2008, chief executive Nick Watkins told a fans forum that the club was then considering opening up the second concourse to add executive boxes to the ground, and, in 2011, when plans for redeveloping a new County Ground coalesced, this was confirmed.

From the start of the 2007/08 season, the stand was renamed the Don Rogers Stand. It was sponsored by Samsung after the 2011/12 season and then by Smiths Roofing in the 2014/15 season. From the start of the 2015/16 season Nationwide Building Society sponsorship returned.

It currently has a capacity of around 4,868.

=== Alan McLoughlin Town End ===
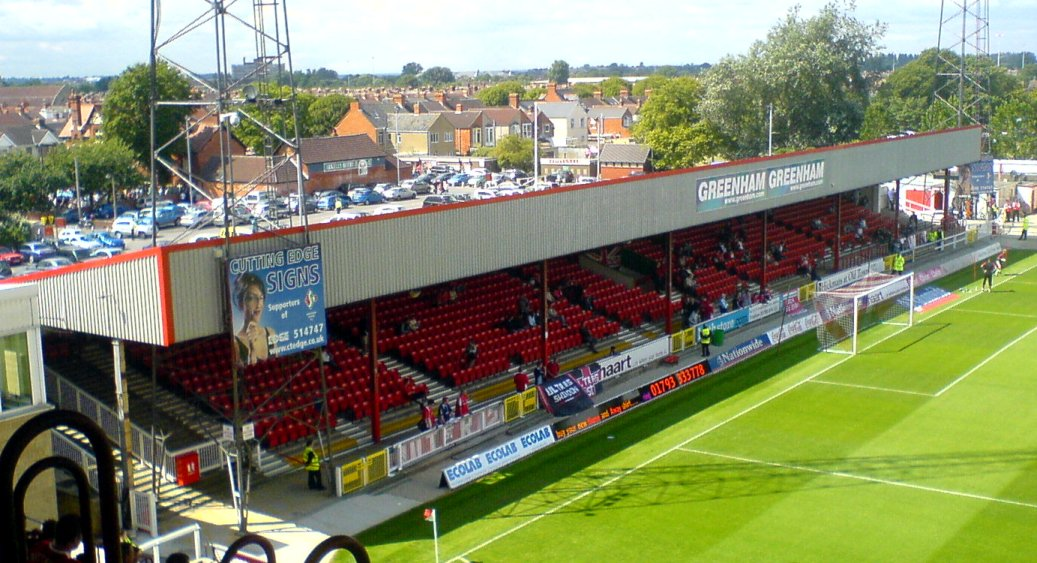
The Town End taken pre-match; August 2006

At the west end of the pitch, this stand is named for its being closest to the town centre. Since the mid-2000s it has become popular with the more vocal fans and therefore has what is considered to be the best atmosphere in the stadium on a match day. One factor is the lower ticket prices for this end and Swindon Town offering the same prices on match day as in advance.

The south end of this stand is notable because the floodlight located there pierces the stand's roof and is integrated into the stand. The Town End is currently sponsored by Imagine Cruising, however companies such as Better, Buzz Gym and Fast Plant have previously held sponsorship rights. The Fast Plant sponsorship was first seen during Swindon Town's derby match against Bristol Rovers in 2015, a match that the hosts won 2–1.

In August 2021, the club renamed the stand after late player and academy director Alan McLoughlin.

The Town End holds approximately 1,846.

== Other uses ==
The ground has been used to host England international games, including the women's international between England and the Netherlands on 14 March 2007 and hosted an England Women friendly match with Spain on 9 April 2019, which England won 2–1. Also, one England under-17s match has been hosted at the County Ground, that was a friendly between the USA U-17s team on 2 September 2004. In conjunction with these matches, the ground has also hosted other football events such as local school competitions and community soccer schools. In 2003, future Swindon striker Charlie Austin scored a hat trick for his school, Sir William Romney’s School in a Gloucestershire and Wiltshire combined schools cup final. Another community function was included in the early 2000s, with the Arkell's stand's concourse being converted into a polling station for the town's local elections.

The ground has in the past been used as a concert venue; most notable for performances by Elton John, Lulu and Bryan Adams. In 2006 the County Ground was in the running to be one of the venues for Bon Jovi's Have A Nice Day tour; however, the County Ground was rejected as it was said to be too small.

During the COVID-19 pandemic the County Ground was considered by Health Secretary Matt Hancock to be used as a Nightingale hospital to take pressure off the nearby Great Western Hospital.

The County Ground is located close to Swindon's Magic Roundabout.
