= Christopher O'Dowd =

Irish soldier

- O'Dowd pictured in his Irish Guards Uniform
- Born: 6 September 1920; Cahernabruck, Shrule, County Mayo, Ireland
- Died: 6 October 1943 (aged 23); Termoli, Italy
- Military career
- Allegiance: United Kingdom
- Branch: British Army
- Rank: Lance-Sergeant
- Units: Irish Guards; Special Air Service
- Conflicts: World War II: Norwegian Campaign; Battle of Greece; Battle of Crete; North African campaign; Western Desert campaign; Italian campaign †; Allied invasion of Italy
- Awards: Military Medal

Christopher O'Dowd (6 September 1920 – 6 October 1943), was an Irish founding member of the British Army's Special Air Service.

== Background ==
O'Dowd was born in Cahernabruck, Shrule, County Mayo, the ninth of twelve children of James O'Dowd (died 1960) and Sarah O'Sullivan (died 1972). He was educated locally and worked as a teenager in a general merchant's store in Ballinrobe.

Aged 18, he ran away to London to join the Irish Guards. O'Dowd had no relations who had previously served in the military, but was well aware of world events and was determined to fight against Nazi Germany and Hitler. He participated in the Norwegian Campaign in 1940, before volunteering for the newly formed Commando unit. He served in Crete and Egypt alongside Randolph Churchill, Evelyn Waugh, and David Stirling.

O'Dowd was one of the first members of a new unit founded by Stirling and Blair Mayne, the SAS. He participated in many of the unit's early missions, which won him the Military Medal. He later served in Sicily and Italy.

O'Dowd was one of eighteen members of the SAS who were killed by a shell in Termoli, Italy, on 6 October 1943. He had been awarded the Military Medal some weeks before.

In 2011, his nephew, Gearóid O'Dowd, published an account of his life and the early years of the SAS.

== Citation for Military Medal ==
- Unit: Irish Guards (attached to 1st Special Sir Service Regiment).
- Regt. No.: 2719054
- Rank and Name: Corporal Christopher O'Dowd
- Action for which commended: Cp. O'Dowd has taken part in five successful operations, he has shown consistent bravery and steadiness.
- At FUKA aerodrome on the 8th May 1942 he assisted to destroy 30 enemy aircraft.
- While engaged on a raid on Benghasi on 14th September 1942 he was in the last vehicle to leave covering the withdrawal by accurate and sustained machine gun fire which drew the defenders fire from the main withdrawing party.
- On 23rd October he was the senior N.C.O. of the raiding party which attacked an enemy convoy driving from Siwa to Mersa Matruh, assisting in destroying four Lancias.
- On 26th October, 1942, he assisted in blowing up the railway line west of Mersa Matruh.
- On 1st November, 1942, he was the senior N.C.O. in a party of six which strafed traffic at Sidi Barrani nd then attacked a railway siding capturing eighteen prisoners, four machine guns, blowing up the railway line and destroying wireless equipment.

== Bibliography ==
- He Who Dared and Died: The Life and Death of an SAS Original Sergeant Chris O'Dowd, MM, Gearóid O'Dowd, 2011. ISBN 978 1 84884 541 1.
