= St. John's Catholic Church (Worcester, Massachusetts) =

Historic church in Massachusetts, United States

- St. John`s Catholic Church
- U.S. National Register of Historic Places
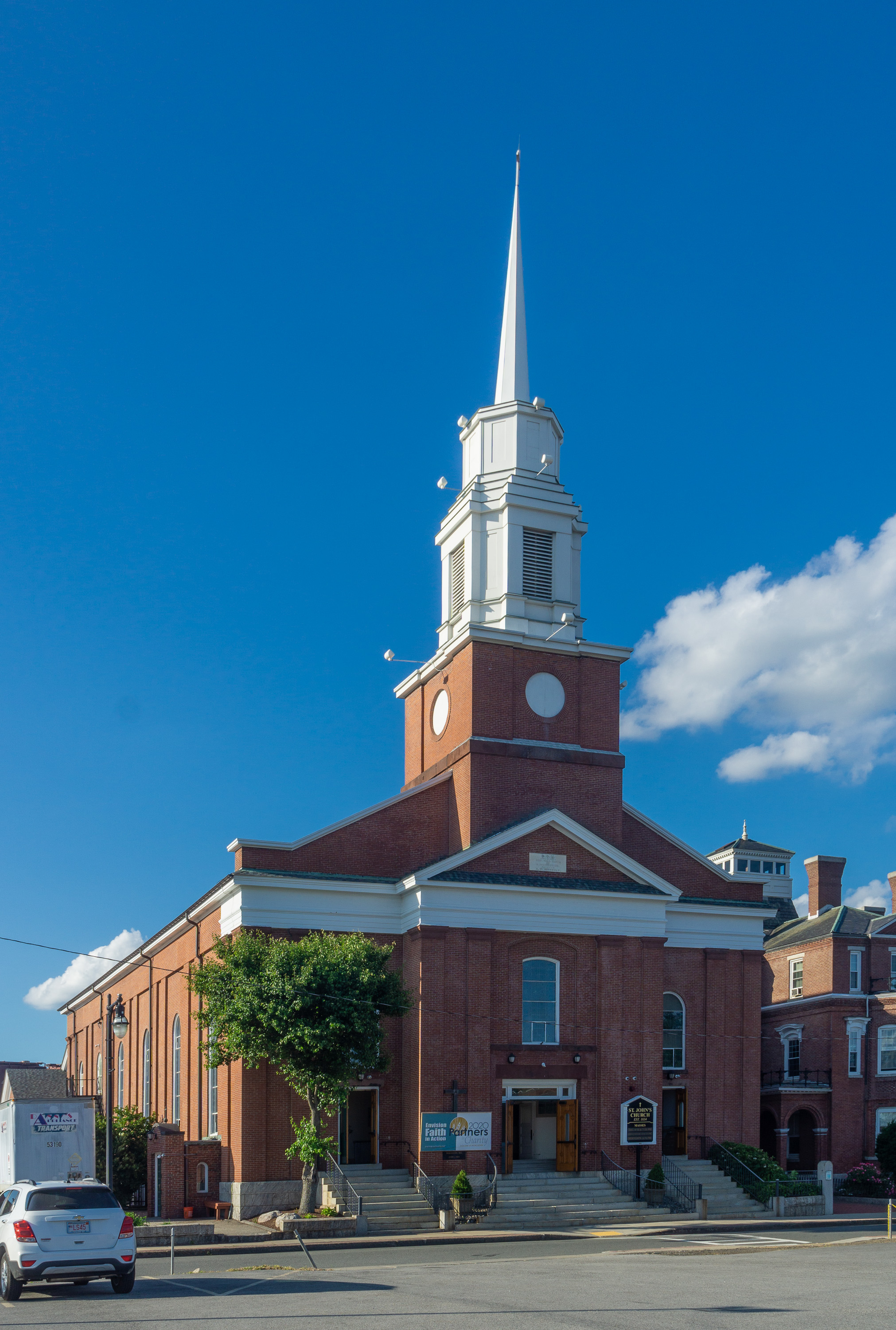

- Location within Massachusetts Location within the United States
- Location: 44 Temple St., Worcester, Massachusetts
- Coordinates: 42°15′35″N 71°47′49″W
- Area: 2 acres (0.81 ha)
- Built: 1845
- Architect: P.W. Ford
- Architectural style: Greek Revival
- MPS: Worcester MRA
- NRHP reference No.: 80000619
- Added to NRHP: March 05, 1980

St. John's Catholic Church, established in 1834, is an historic Roman Catholic parish church in Worcester, Massachusetts. It is the oldest established Catholic religious institution in the city, and the oldest Catholic parish in New England outside of Boston. On March 5, 1980, its 1845 church building was added to the National Register of Historic Places.

In 1834 James Fitton laid the foundation for a church on Front Street, known as "Christ's Church". It was completed in 1836.

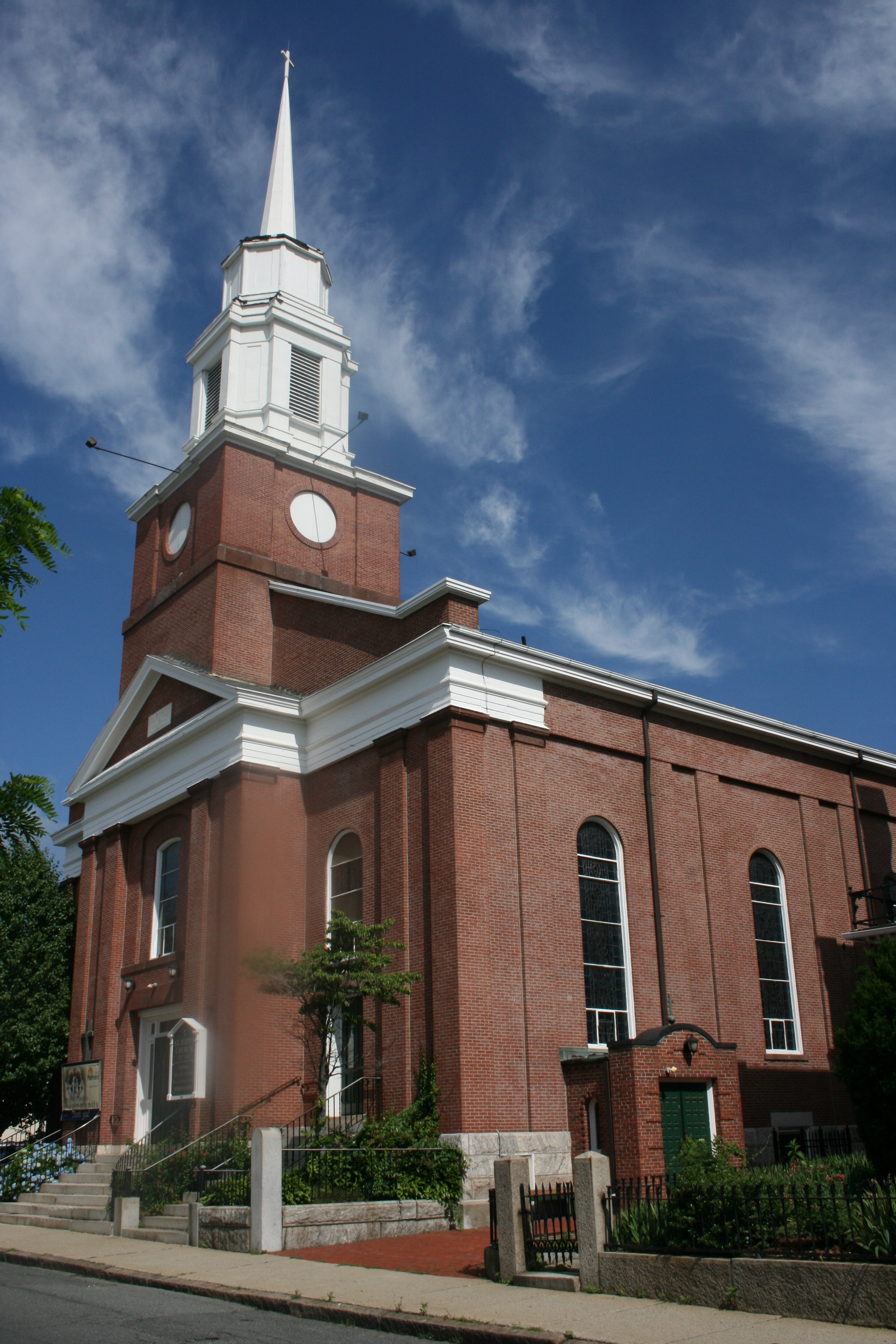

.

== See also ==
- List of Catholic churches in the United States
- National Register of Historic Places listings in northwestern Worcester, Massachusetts
- National Register of Historic Places listings in Worcester County, Massachusetts
