= Fitton Field =

Stadium in Worcester, Massachusetts

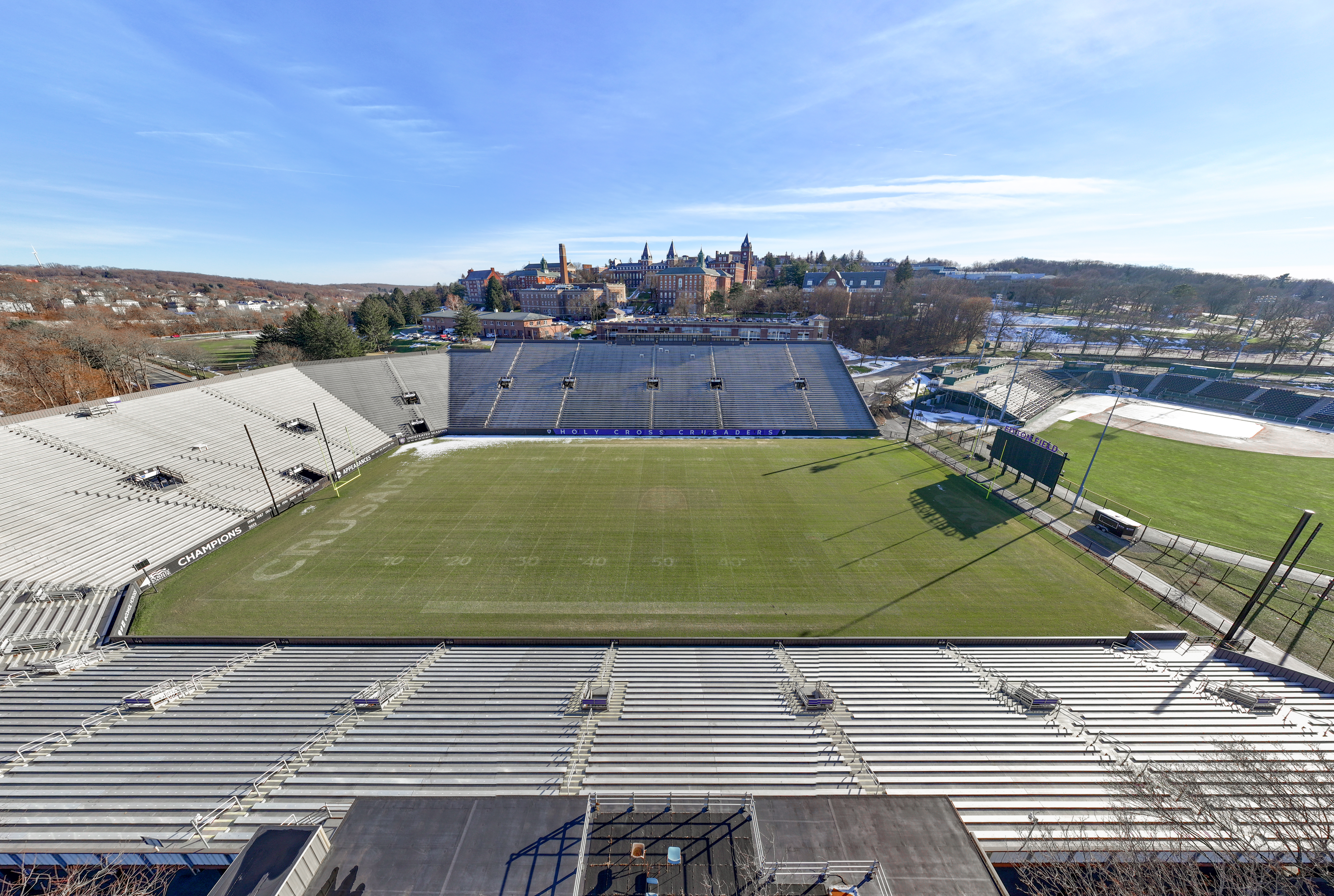
- The venue photographed in 2024

- Location within Massachusetts Fitton Field (the United States)
- Interactive map of Fitton Field
- Full name: Fitton Football Stadium
- Address: 1 College St. Worcester, MA; United States
- Coordinates: 42°14′29.6″N 71°48′35.9″W
- Owner: College of the Holy Cross
- Operator: Holy Cross Athletics
- Capacity: 23,500 (1986–present)
- Type: Stadium
- Surface: Kentucky bluegrass (2016–present)
- Record attendance: 27,000
- Current use: Football

Construction
- Opened: September 26, 1908; 118 years ago
- Renovated: 1912; 1924; 1986; 2016
- Expanded: 1912, 1924, 1986

Tenant
- Holy Cross Crusaders (NCAA) 1908–present

Website
- goholycross.com/fitton-field

Fitton Field is a football stadium in Worcester, Massachusetts, primarily used for College of the Holy Cross sporting events. The stadium opened in 1908 as the official home for the Holy Cross Crusaders football team. Before that, most games were played on the adjoining baseball field. The stadium has a capacity of 23,500.

Named after Reverend James Fitton, who donated land to the Archdiocese of Boston to found the college, it is an irregularly shaped three-sided horseshoe on the edge of the college's campus. The northern football stands are shorter than the southern due to Interstate 290 being adjacent to the field.

== History ==
Officially known as Fitton Football Stadium, the football facility is home to the Holy Cross Crusaders football team. The field itself was used as the football field, and termed Fitton Field, as early as 1908. A wooden structure was constructed at that time, but a more sturdy concrete structure did not appear until 1912. In 1924, the concrete was replaced with the steel structure that still stands today, increasing the stadium's capacity. It would remain identical until 1986, when the wooden seating was replaced with aluminum bleachers, further expanding its capacity to its current level. In 2016, the field was completely replaced for the first time since 1903. Among the upgrades was a new bluegrass blend sod planted as well as new irrigation systems and netting.

Fitton Field has hosted numerous speakers including commencement addresses by two sitting presidents. President Theodore Roosevelt delivered his address in 1905, while touring Massachusetts, this was his only public speech in Worcester. President Lyndon B. Johnson gave his address in 1964, replacing the initial guest, President John F. Kennedy, who had been assassinated just a few months prior.

=== Attendance ===
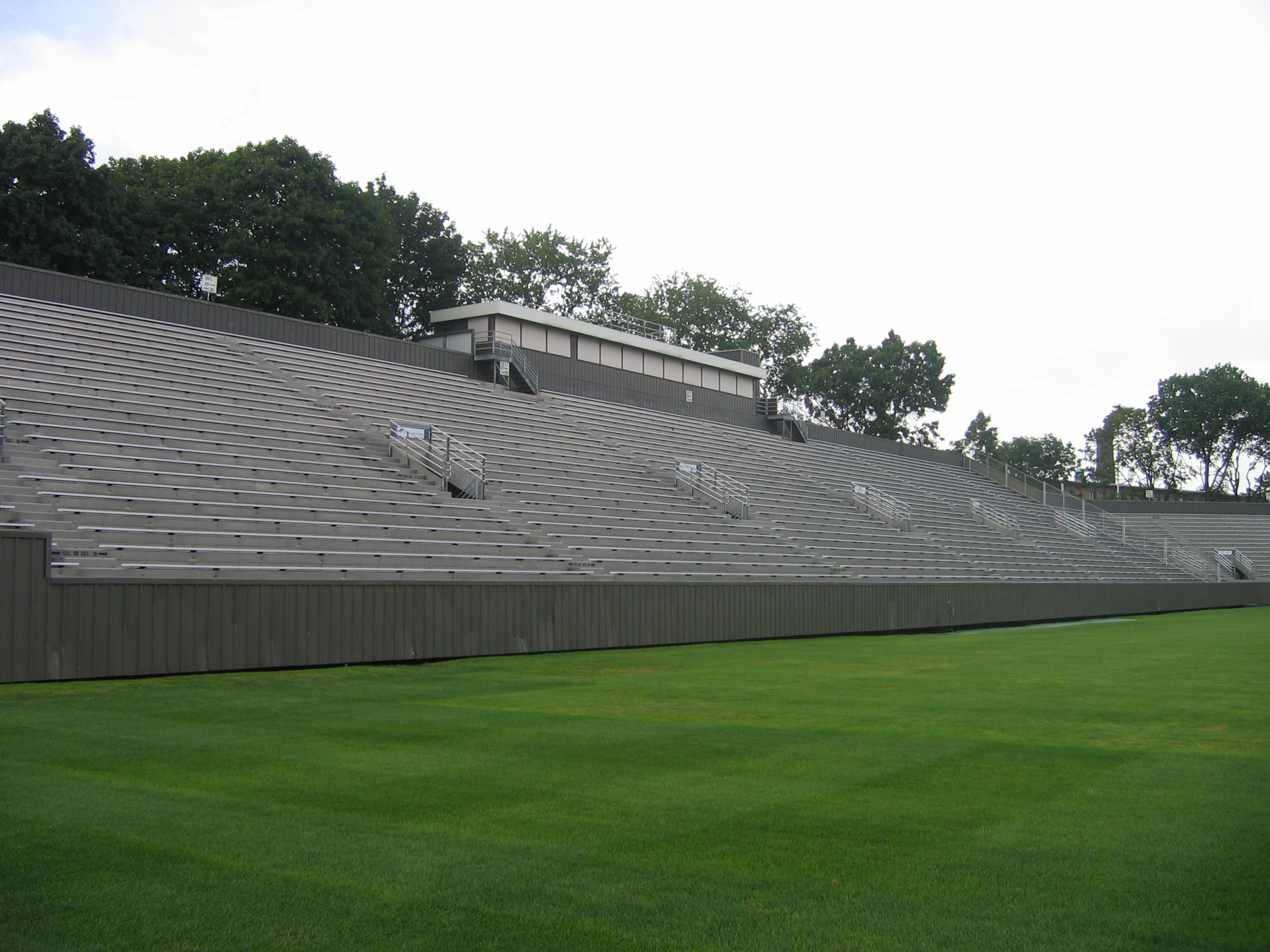
Home stands of the stadium

While historically having high attendance numbers, with many fans from the Worcester area and beyond filling the disproportionately large stadium; in the 1990s an over two-decade slump of relatively low attendance began. However, with the resurgence of the Holy Cross Crusaders football team in recent years, attendance numbers have begun to rebound. In 2022, in a game against the Fordham Rams football team, Fitton Field posted its highest attendance since the 1980s, with almost 18,000 fans as audience to a revived historical rivalry and Crusader victory.

The largest attendance at Fitton Field was 27,000 in 1938 which was the last home game for Holy Cross's All-American back, Bill Osmanski.

=== Panorama ===
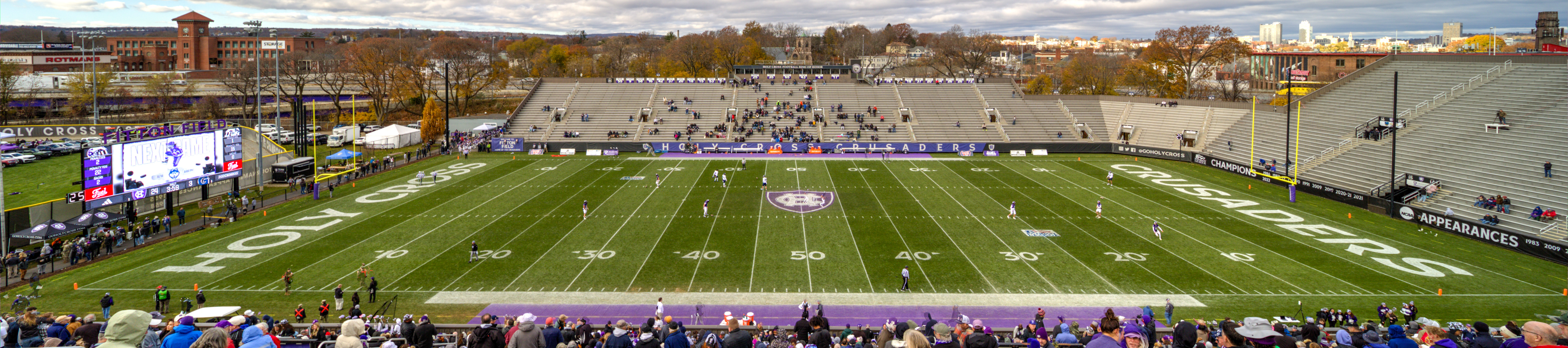
Fitton Field looking north; note scoreboard at left; skyline of Worcester at upper right

== Facts and figures ==
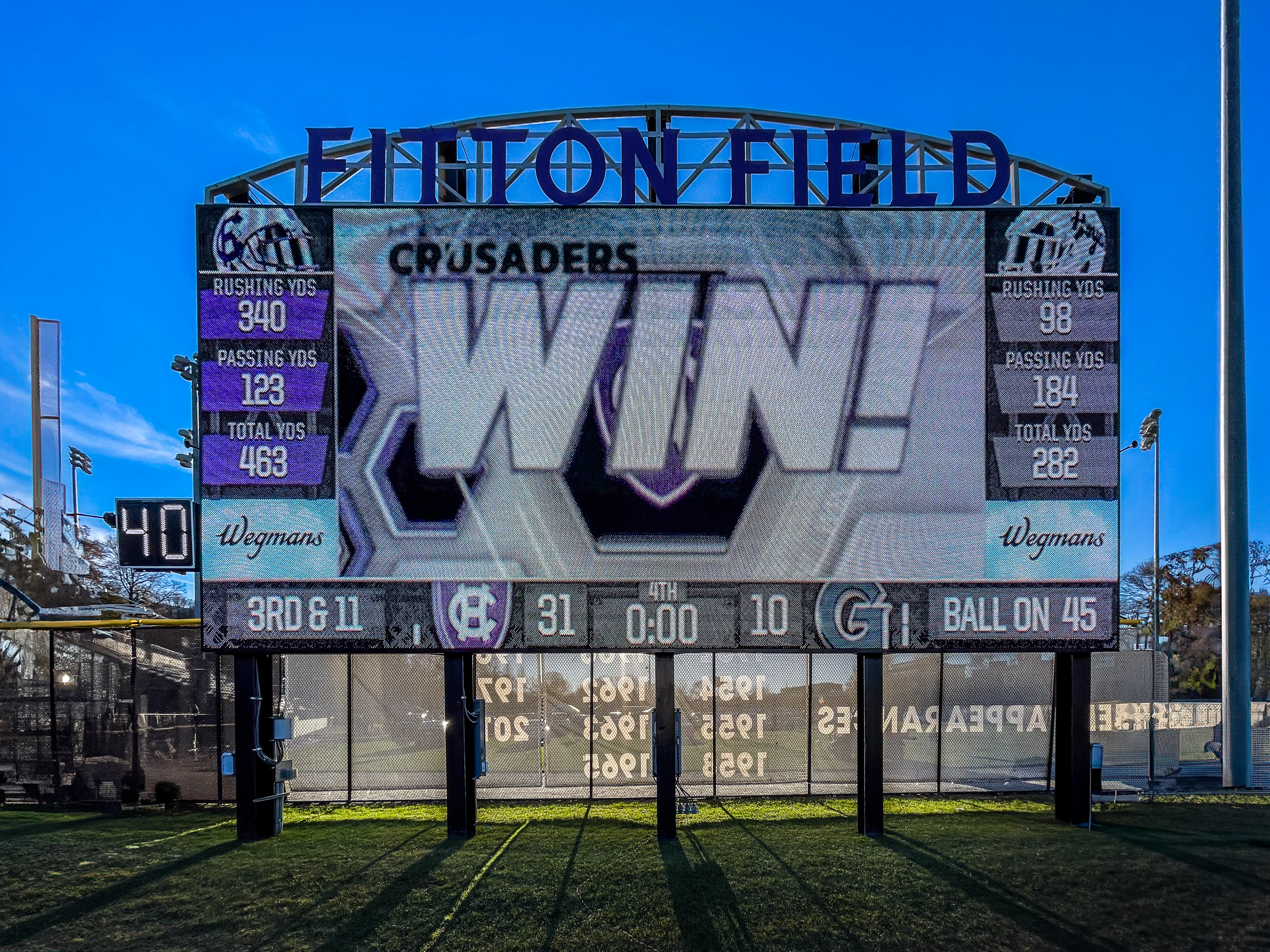
Scoreboard

In 1992, Fitton Field was to be the home of the New England Blitz of the Professional Spring Football League, but the PSFL folded before any games were played.

Fitton Field was used to film the movie The Game Plan in 2006.

As of 2022, Fitton Field is the fourth oldest Division I football stadium, surpassed only by Franklin Field, Harvard Stadium and Kyle Field. The field also holds the record of being the 15th largest Division I FCS stadium in terms of capacity and by far the largest in the Patriot League.

== See also ==
- List of NCAA Division I FCS football stadiums
