= Andrew Fitton =

British businessman

Andrew Fitton is a telecoms specialist, and part owner and former chairman of Swindon Town F.C. He works currently for Transcomm plc. as chief executive. He also worked with Mobitex and United Wireless Holdings.

== Swindon Town Football Club ==
In 2007, after the deal looked like it was about to fall through and while the club looked likely to fall into administration. He bought 75% of the club with a consortium of others for an undisclosed fee from Sir Seton Wills, James Wills and Mike Diamandis in early 2008. The club at this point was in £4 million of debt but he paid to have the debt cleared, hence removing the transfer embargo and lifting the club out of administration.

== Chairmanship ==
He at first appointed the manager Maurice Malpas but fired him in 2008 after the club was in risk of relegation. He then appointed Danny Wilson as manager who led the club to the 2010 Playoff Final. Wilson was less successful the next season and was replaced by Paul Hart.

Fitton was working on expanding the County Ground, Swindon to a 19,000-seat stadium. He was known to not have spent much money on transfers due to his efforts to keep the club financially viable. At the 2011 Annual General Meeting he released a statement, showing that they were the only profitable League 1 club, partly because Fitton sold striker Simon Cox for £1.5 million to West Bromwich Albion. He resigned from the chairmanship of the Football Club on 27 April 2011, claiming responsibility for the underperformance of the team in a season which culminated in relegation.
