= Benjamin Fitton =

- Origin: Northampton, Northamptonshire U.K.
- Genres: Folk rock, acoustic
- Instruments: Acoustic Guitar, electric guitar
- Years active: 2010–present
- Website: Official Benjamin Fitton Website

Benjamin Fitton is an English singer songwriter. He released his first album under the pseudonym of This Unique Museum in 2006 after winning a best unsigned band competition on London's XFM Radio. From 2006 to 2011 he released eight recordings as This Unique Museum, including collections of covers of alternative rock songs. Starting in 2010 he began writing and recording a Song a Week for an entire year, and has released several additional albums under his own name.

== Discography ==
=== as This Unique Museum ===
- A Collection Of Short Stories (2006)
- Installment One: A Killer, A Murder, A Mystery... (2007)
- Chapter One: A Catalogue of Madness & Melancholy (2007)
- Installment Two: Charms & Grace (2007)
- Lost At Sea: Out-Takes From The Great Lake (2008)
- Installment Three: A Little Ghost For The Offering (2009)
- Installment Four: Leave the Fire Behind (2010)
- Chapter Two: Caught Between The Devil and the Deep Blue Sea (2011)

=== as Benjamin Fitton ===
- Something for the Year #1 (2010)
- Something for the Year #2 (2011)
- Something for the Year #3 (2011)
- Something for the Year #4 (2011)
