= Roger Mainwaring (judge) =

Judge in Ireland (died 1590)

Roger Mainwaring (died 1590) was an English-born judge and Crown servant in Ireland during the reign of Elizabeth I.

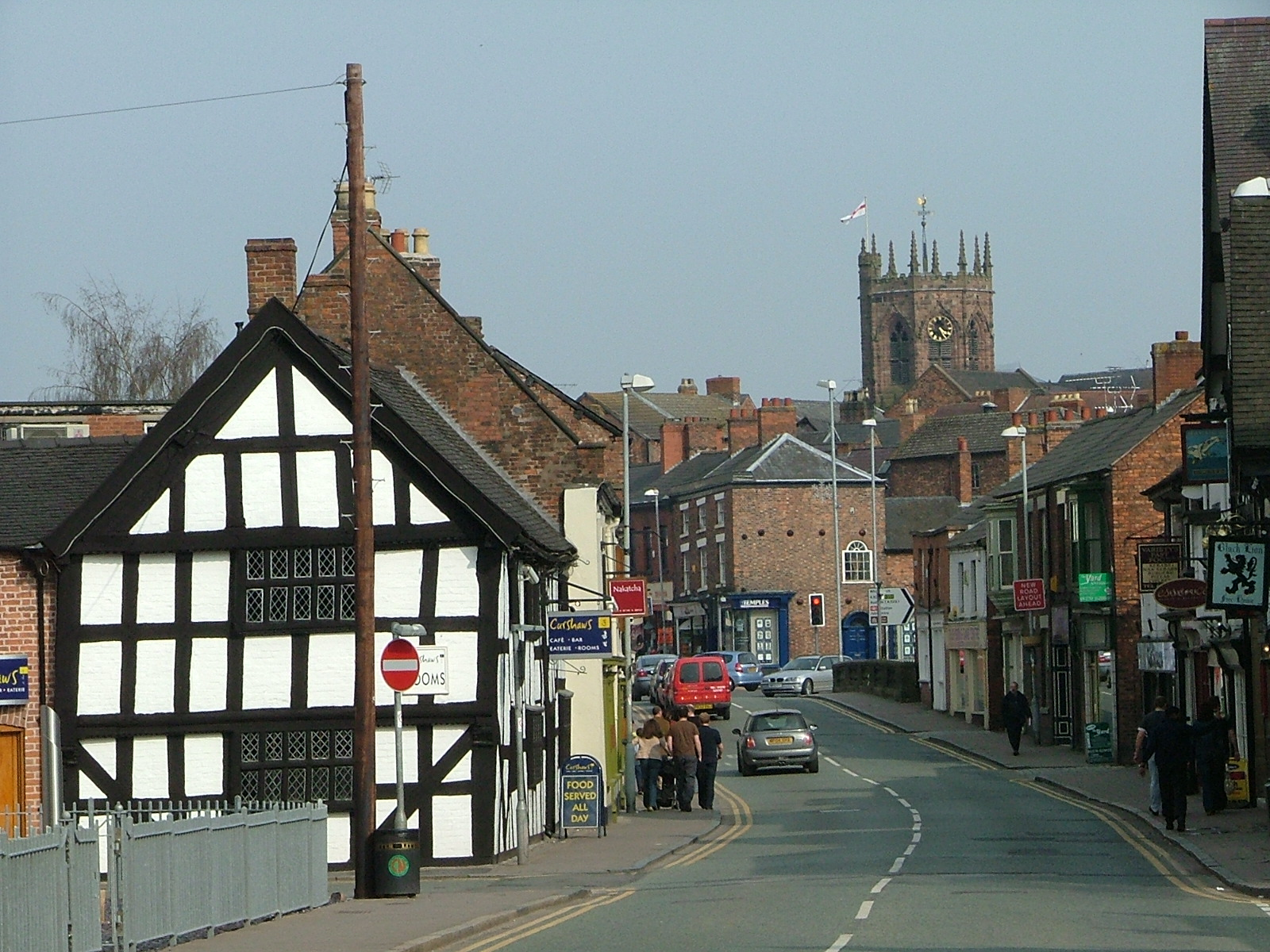
Nantwich, Cheshire, where Roger's branch of the Mainwaring family lived for several generations

== Mainwaring family ==
He was the eldest son of John Mainwaring and his wife Margery Brooke, daughter of Robert Brooke, and grandson of Oliver Mainwaring. He was born at Nantwich in Cheshire, where he owned "a mansion house" and other properties, and where he ultimately retired. The Mainwaring family had been settled in Nantwich for generations, and had acquired lands on the dissolution of nearby Combermere Abbey in 1538. They were distantly related to the Mainwarings of Peover Hall, whose most distinguished member was the seventeenth-century statesman Sir Philip Mainwaring (1589-1661): Philip, like Roger, spent most of his career in Ireland. Sir Roger Wilbraham, Solicitor-General for Ireland 1586-1603, a fellow Nantwich man, was a cousin of Roger's second wife, through his mother Elizabeth Maisterson. Roger's mother Margery reached a considerable age, and was still alive when he made his last will.

== Career ==
Roger came to Ireland in 1569 in the entourage of Sir Edward Fitton, the elder, his future father-in-law, who had been appointed Lord President of Connaught. He purchased substantial lands in County Dublin and County Meath, most of which he bequeathed to his second wife Margaret for her lifetime. He lived for a time at Ferns Castle, County Wexford, which belonged to Margaret's family, the Maistersons.

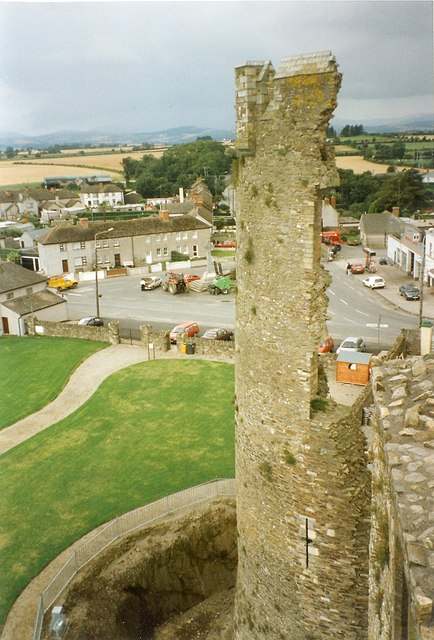
Ferns Castle, County Wexford, home of Roger's father-in-law, Sir Thomas Maisterson

Roger became Chief Remembrancer of the Exchequer of Ireland in 1575, (his main job was to prepare the Court files for the Barons to read), and third Baron of the Court of Exchequer (Ireland) in 1577. In 1576 he was one of the numerous highly-placed Irish officials appointed by the Queen to a commission to "make an inquisition in several counties for concealed lands of monasteries and attainted persons". He was superseded as Remembrancer in 1583, and since he had returned to Nantwich by 1585, presumably he stepped down as a judge at the same time. He was clearly seen as something of an expert on the Irish finances, as he was summoned back to Ireland from his retirement in 1585 to assist the Chief Auditor of Ireland in dealing with the Exchequer receipts. He was still purchasing property in Ireland as late as 1587.

== Marriages and children ==
He was married twice: firstly in 1571 to one of the daughters of Sir Edward Fitton and Ann Warburton, who seems to have died young without issue; and secondly before 1577 to Margaret Maisterson, daughter of Sir Thomas Maisterson of Nantwich and Ferns, head of a prosperous family from Nantwich, and a relative of Roger through his mother Margery Mainwaring. Sir Thomas was a leading figure in the South of Ireland, where he became Seneschal of County Wexford. Her mother was Catherine (or Cecily) de Clere of County Kilkenny. According to his last will, which was admitted to probate on 1 May 1590, Roger had five children, three sons and two daughters, by his second marriage. His eldest son Richard (born at his grandfather's home, Ferns Castle, County Wexford, in 1577), succeeded to most of his father's estates, although the family's "chief mansion house" at Nantwich, as well as the Irish lands, were left to Roger's widow Margaret for her lifetime.

He died early in 1590. His widow was still alive in 1608. His daughter, the younger Margaret, who seems to have been his eventual heiress, married Sir Edward Dod of Edge Hall, Prebendary of Chester, the head of an ancient Cheshire family, and had issue.

== Sources ==
- Ball, F. Elrington The Judges in Ireland 1221-1921 London John Murray 1926
- Burke, John History of the Commoners of Great Britain and Ireland London Henry Colburn 4 Volumes 1836 Vol. 3
- The Irish Fiants of the Tudor Sovereigns during the Reigns of Henry VIII, Edward VI, Phillip and Mary and Elizabeth I Vol. II Dublin 1994
- Lancashire and Cheshire Wills and Inventories, from the Ecclesiastical Court of Chester Published by the Chetham Society 1861
