= Fitton End =

Hamlet in Cambridgeshire, England

Coordinates: 52.69636°N 0.13029°W

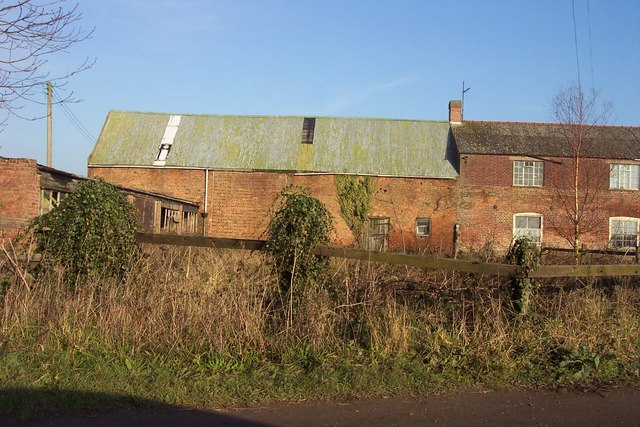
Fitton Croft Farm

Fitton End is a hamlet in the civil parish of Newton-in-the-Isle, in the Fenland district, in the county of Cambridgeshire, England. It has a population of 70.
