= Margaret Fitton =

British artist

- Born: Margaret Mary Elizabeth Cook; 1902; Willesden, London
- Died: 1988 (aged 85–86)
- Education: Central School of Arts and Crafts
- Known for: Painting, illustration
- Spouse: James Fitton

Margaret Mary Elizabeth Fitton nee Cook (1902–1988) was a British artist, notable as a painter, sculptor and illustrator.

== Biography ==
Fitton was born in London and grew up in the Willesden area of the city. Her father was a civil servant and both her mother and uncle had trained as artists. Fitton was privately educated and studied at the Central School of Arts and Crafts in central London. Alongside her studies, she modelled for a number of artists, including Barnett Freedman and for her future husband, James Fitton, whom she married in 1928. The couple subsequently had two children.

After graduating, Fitton worked as a book illustrator for Warne & Company from 1925 to 1928. She also created illustrations for Lilliput and The Listener. From 1931 to 1957 Fitton was a regular exhibitor at the Royal Academy and, during 1939 and 1940, showed 16 pieces with the Society of Women Artists. She also exhibited with the London Group, the New English Art Club and the Artists' International Association of which she was a member. She also showed works with the Senefelder Club, at the Storran Gallery and at the Art Institute of Chicago.
