= Fitton Rock =

Fitton Rock (67°46′S 68°34′W) is a flat-topped rock lying southeast of Cape Alexandra, off the south end of Adelaide Island. It was first charted by the French Antarctic Expedition, 1908–10, under Jean-Baptiste Charcot, and was named by the UK Antarctic Place-Names Committee in 1963 for Gordon F. Fitton, a British Antarctic Survey general assistant at Adelaide Station, 1961–62, and a member of the first party to winter on Adelaide Island.
