= Black River (Ireland) =

River in Connacht, Ireland

- Native name: An Abhainn Dubh (Irish)

Location
- Country: Ireland

Physical characteristics
- Source
  - location: Rathbaun Turlough
  - elevation: 36 m (118 ft)
- Mouth
  - location: Atlantic Ocean at Galway Harbour via River Corrib
- Length: 28.57 km (17.75 mi)

Basin features
- Tributaries
  - left: Togher River, Kilshanvy River

The Black River (Irish: An Abhainn Dubh; OSI grid ref: M2953) is a river in Connacht in Ireland. For much of its length it forms the border between County Galway and County Mayo. It flows past Shrule, and drains into Lough Corrib.
