= Mary Fitton =

16th/17th-century English gentlewoman and maid of honour to Elizabeth I of England

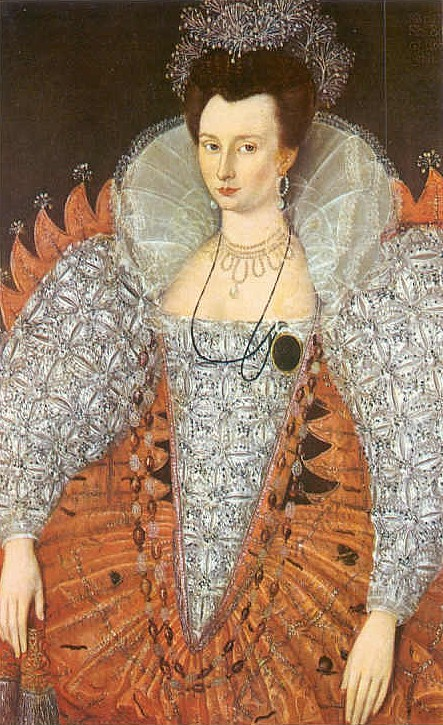
- Portrait of Mary Fitton circa 1595
- Born: June 1578; Gawsworth, Cheshire
- Died: 1641 (aged 62–63); Tettenhall, Staffs
- Spouse(s): William Polwhele (m. 1606–1609) (widowed) John Lougher (m. 1612–1636) (widowed)
- Children: Anne Leveson Charnock, William Polwhele, Mary Polwhele Gatacre, Elizabeth Lougher, John Lougher, Lettice Lougher Denton (Dainton)
- Parent(s): Sir Edward Fitton; Alice Halcroft

Mary Fitton (or Fytton or Phytton) (baptised 25 June 1578 – 19 December 1641) was an Elizabethan gentlewoman who became a maid of honour to Queen Elizabeth. She is noted for her scandalous affairs with William Herbert, 3rd Earl of Pembroke, Vice-Admiral Sir Richard Leveson, and others. She is considered by some to be the "Dark Lady" of Shakespeare's sonnets.

== Family ==
Fitton was the daughter of Sir Edward Fitton of Gawsworth, Cheshire and Alice Holcroft. She had at least three siblings: her elder sister Anne, who married John Newdigate in 1587 at the age of twelve, and two brothers. One of her brothers was Edward Fitton.

== Life at court ==
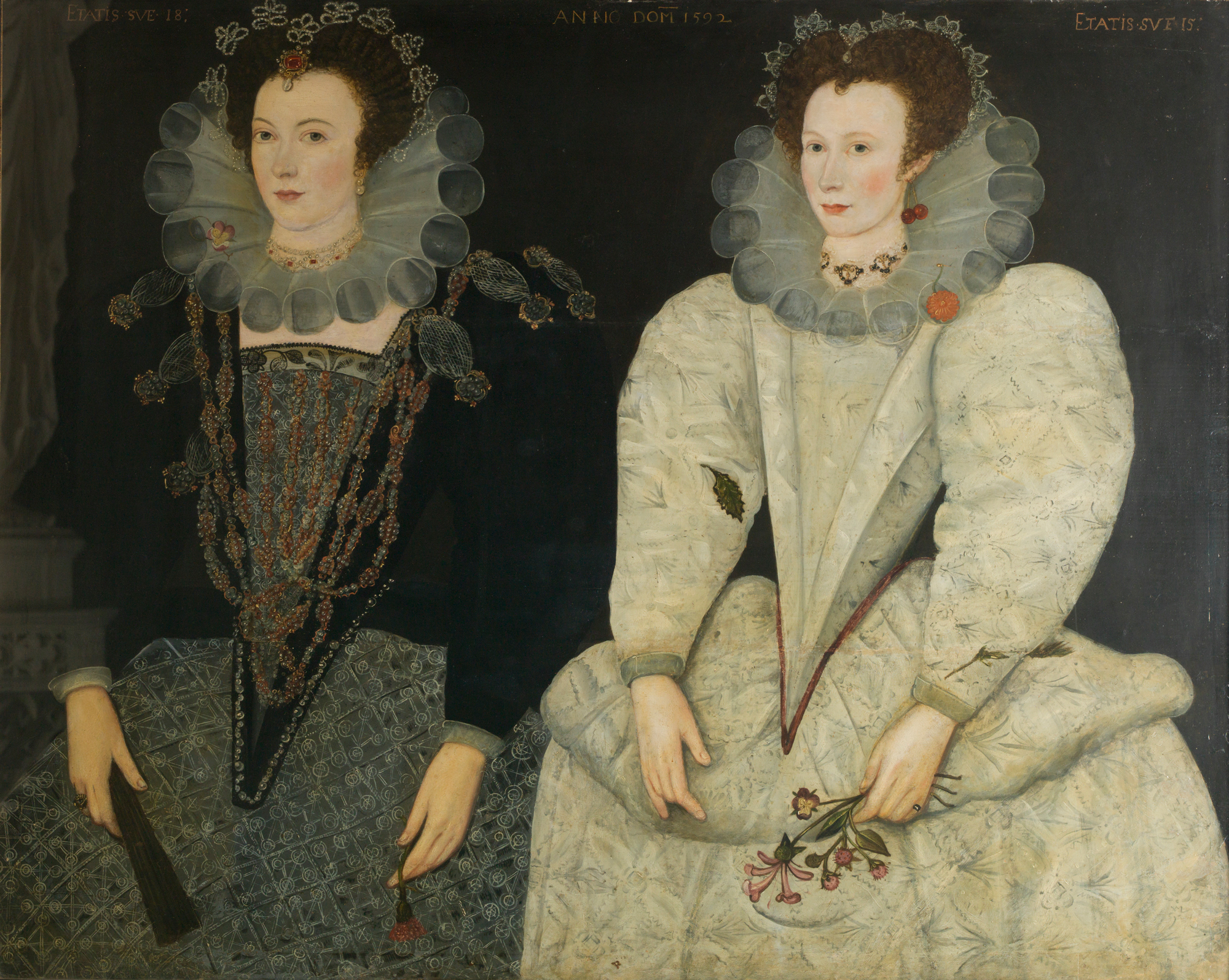
Double portrait by unknown artist of her sister Anne Newdigate and Mary Fitton in 1592

Mary Fitton became a maid of honour to Queen Elizabeth in about 1595. Her father recommended her to the care of Sir William Knollys, Comptroller of the Queen's household. Knollys promised, "I will be as careful of her well doing as if I were her own true father." but Knollys, then fifty years old and married, soon became suitor to Mary Fitton. He wrote of his passion to her sister and even named Mary's niece, whom he was sponsoring as godfather, "Mary". His infatuation was well known and mocked in court.

In 1598 a horse known as "Grey Fytton" was kept for her to ride in the royal stables. In January 1599, Mary had to quit the court and returned to her father's house at Charing Cross because she was sick and "not well at ease". She was suffering from a mixture of physical and mental symptoms that Elizabethans called "suffocation of the mother", probably a form of hysteria. When she returned to court, she refused Knollys.

In June 1600 Mary led a dance in the masque celebrating the fashionable wedding of Lady Anne Russell, granddaughter of the Earl of Bedford, with Henry Somerset, later created Marquess of Worcester, at Lord Cobham's residence in Blackfriars. Led by Mary, the maids performed an allegorical dance and afterwards chose substitutes from the audience. Mary boldly chose the queen, telling her that she represented Affection (which then meant passionate love), to which the queen replied "Affection? Affection's false". The masque was perhaps unusual, as on other occasions the noble dancers (especially women) rarely gave speeches.

William Herbert, later Earl of Pembroke, is known to have been present at this dance. Mary Fitton became his fiancee and was soon pregnant. In February 1601 Pembroke was sent to the Fleet Prison after admitting paternity but refusing to marry Mistress Fitton. Mary Fitton was placed with Lady Margaret Hawkins, the widow of Admiral Sir John Hawkins, for her confinement. In March 1601 she gave birth to a baby boy who, the story went around Court, was stillborn, (perhaps from syphilis, which it is believed Pembroke may have suffered from). There is some evidence which might suggest the child survived and was discretely removed to be fostered.

Both Mary and Pembroke were dismissed from court. Mary would live out her life in a property leased from her second cousin, Richard Levenson (below), the Manor House at Perton, near Wolverhampton. It is possible that William Fitton, buried at the nearby Tettenhall Church on 9th Jan 1608, was the child born in March 1601.

== Life after court ==
Mary did not seem as abashed by the business as her father, who considered it to be social ruin. Knollys tried to woo her once again, but Mary was firm. She had an affair with the married Vice-Admiral Sir Richard Leveson, bearing him two daughters. He left her £100 after his death in 1605 (his wife, who was suffering from a serious mental illness, had to be committed to the care of her father).

After this she married Captain William Polwhele, one of Leveson's officers. She bore a son that was presumably his. Her mother was scandalized, writing to her other, married, daughter, "such shame as never had a Cheshire woman, worse now than ever. Write no more to me of her." Even Mary's marriage to Polwhele did not mollify her mother; she referred to Polwhele as "a very knave".

When her husband died in September 1609, Mary was pregnant and had a son and daughter to take care of. About 1612 she married again, to a Pembrokeshire captain named John Lougher. Lougher was a "gentleman lawyer" and former M.P., who once served on the court of high commission at York. He died in 1636. Her death is registered at Tettenhall, Staffs, on 19th September 1641. She requested to be buried in Gawsworth, leaving a little Welsh property to her daughter who had married and had children herself. Her ghost is reputed to haunt Gawsworth Old Hall.

== Shakespeare ==
Her relationship with Herbert is the basis for the claim that Fitton was the "dark lady" of Shakespeare's sonnets. Herbert is one of the main candidates for the identity of the Fair Youth, a character who betrays the poet by having an affair with the Dark Lady, hence the claim that Fitton might be the lady. The suggestion was first made by Thomas Tyler in his 1890 edition of the sonnets. It was taken up by Frank Harris in several books, including The Women of Shakespeare and Shakespeare and his Love. His influential biography The Man Shakespeare asserted that Fitton had ruined Shakespeare's life and that he died "broken hearted for love of the Dark Lady".

Recent scholars have not pursued these assertions. Paul Edmondson and Stanley Wells comment that "her star waned when she was discovered to have been fair". However, her portrait shows dark-brown hair. There is no hint in her biography that she was acquainted with Shakespeare. She had some literary connections; William Kempe, who was a clown in Shakespeare's company, dedicated his Nine Daies Wonder (1600) to "Mistress Anne Fitton", Maid of Honor to Elizabeth. This may have been an error as Mary, rather than her sister Anne, was Maid of Honor to Queen Elizabeth I. There is a sonnet addressed to Mary Fitton in Anthony Munday's volume, A Womans Woorth defended against all the Men in the World. She was the grandmother of Ellen Polwhele who was probably the author of The Frolicks, or a Lawyer Cheated(1671) and was the first woman to write for the professional stage.

== Fitton correspondence ==
Letters written to Mary Fitton's sister Anne Newdigate were preserved in the Newdigate family archives. In the 1890s these letters were transcribed and published by Lady Newdigate-Newdegate (the wife of Sir Edward Newdigate-Newdegate).
