= James Fitton (artist) =

English painter

- Born: 11 February 1899; Oldham, Lancashire, England
- Died: 2 May 1982 (aged 83)
- Education: Manchester School of Art; Central School of Arts and Crafts
- Known for: Painting

James Fitton RA (11 February 1899 – 2 May 1982) was an English painter, lithographer and theatre set designer, and a founder member of the left-wing Artists' International Association.

== Early life ==
Fitton was born in Oldham, Lancashire, England, on 11 February 1899. He was the third and youngest child of working-class Methodist parents who lived in a typical two-up two-down terraced house in Herbert Street, Oldham. The city was in its heyday, and was well known as the centre of the world's cotton-spinning industry. Consequently, the local landscape was dominated by mill buildings such as the Ruby Mill which backed onto the family home, and Watersheddings Mill, where Fitton's mother worked as a weaver.

The family circumstances were harsh and James Fitton senior began his working life aged seven cleaning mill machinery. One day whilst clearing detritus from underneath the looms, they were turned on and he became caught in the equipment. He survived the accident but lost an ear, and continued to work, becoming a mill engineer. Fitton's mother was a similarly resilient character and was operating six looms on her usual eleven-hour shift just three days before giving birth to James. She resumed her exhausting schedule a few days later.

The plight of the working-class mill-workers in Oldham - working long hours and living cheek-by-jowl in cramped dwellings - left Fitton's father with a sense of injustice. He became actively interested in politics and played a prominent role in the Labour movement in the North-West, for which he paid dearly. Employed at the Asa Lees Textile Machine Manufacturers as a foreman in the iron planning shop, he helped to establish the United Machine Workers Union, of which he was Branch Secretary. Identified as the ringleader of a strike, he was immediately sacked. Subsequently, Fitton's father could only find employment using an alias and was forced to work far from home. He was trapped in a permanent night shift at the National Gas Engine Company in Ashton-under-Lyne and spent his free time arranging Fabian gatherings. Socialist propaganda poured forth from the family home and Keir Hardie, Emmeline Pankhurst, Annie Kenney and others were amongst those attracted to the meetings, sometimes staying overnight.

== Career ==
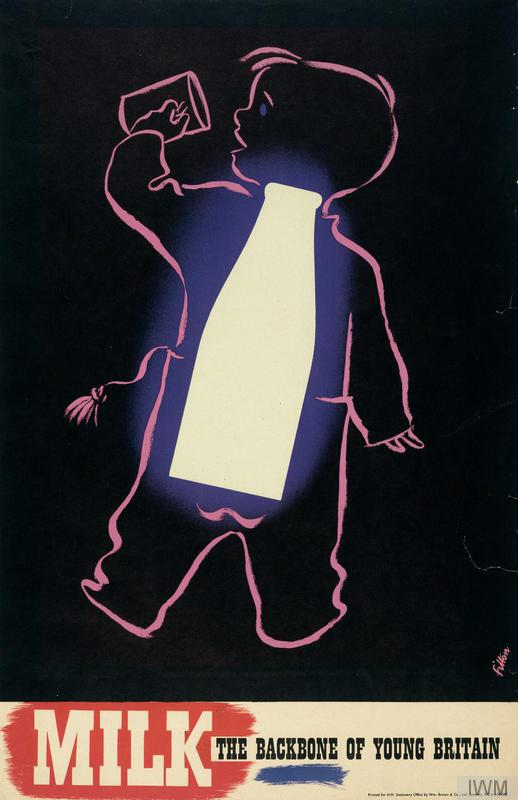
Milk The Backbone of Young Britain (Art.IWM PST 4944)

Fitton's passion for drawing developed when he was hospitalised aged eight after a botched mastoid operation, performed on the kitchen table. In a letter home to his parents he wrote “Be sure and bring my paints and paper and my bag of boiled sweets or I shall be vexed”. Although the infection was stymied, Fitton was rendered permanently deaf in one ear and endured weekly trips to hospital over a two-year period, with long spells in waiting rooms where he observed and studied his surroundings. In an introduction to the Dulwich Picture Gallery catalogue, John Sheeran suggested that Fitton's keen visual awareness may have been heightened by the damage to one of his senses.

Fitton was educated at the Watersheddings Board School, but his health problems adversely affected his academic performance and he left school aged fourteen, prompting his headmaster to remark: “He won’t be good at anything – that is except drawing”. He subsequently attended evening classes at Manchester School of Art under Adolfe Vallette. His fellow pupils included L. S. Lowry and Sam Rabin.

In 1920 Fitton moved to London where he attended evening classes at the Central School of Arts and Crafts and was tutored by Archibald Standish Hartrick. He first exhibited at the Royal Academy in 1929 and from 1932, Fitton was an active member of the London Group. His first solo exhibition was held at the Arthur Tooth and Sons gallery in 1933. Fitton worked in a wide variety of formats, producing cartoons for the Left Review and posters for the Ministry of Food. He worked as a printer and advertising artist, and in 1937 designed posters for London Transport, commissioned by Frank Pick. In the late forties he executed cinema posters and programmes for the Ealing Studios and Romulus Films.

Fitton appeared as a castaway on the BBC Radio programme Desert Island Discs on 9 January 1971.

== Legacy ==
Fitton's work is in the permanent collections of Tate, the Herbert Art Gallery and Museum in Coventry, and Newport Museum and Art Gallery. A portrait of his wife, Margaret Fitton nee Cook, whom he married in 1928, is in the Nottingham City Museums and Galleries collection. Four photographic portraits of him, by various photographers, are in the collection of the National Portrait Gallery.

Exhibitions of his work were held at Gallery Oldham in 1983 and at Dulwich Picture Gallery in 1986.

== Memberships ==
- 1944: Elected associate of the Royal Academy
- 1954: Elected full member of the Royal Academy
- 1968-75: Trustee of the British Museum
- 1970-82: Honorary Surveyor of Dulwich College Picture Gallery
- 1974: Elected Senior Member of the Royal Academy
