= James Fitton (priest) =

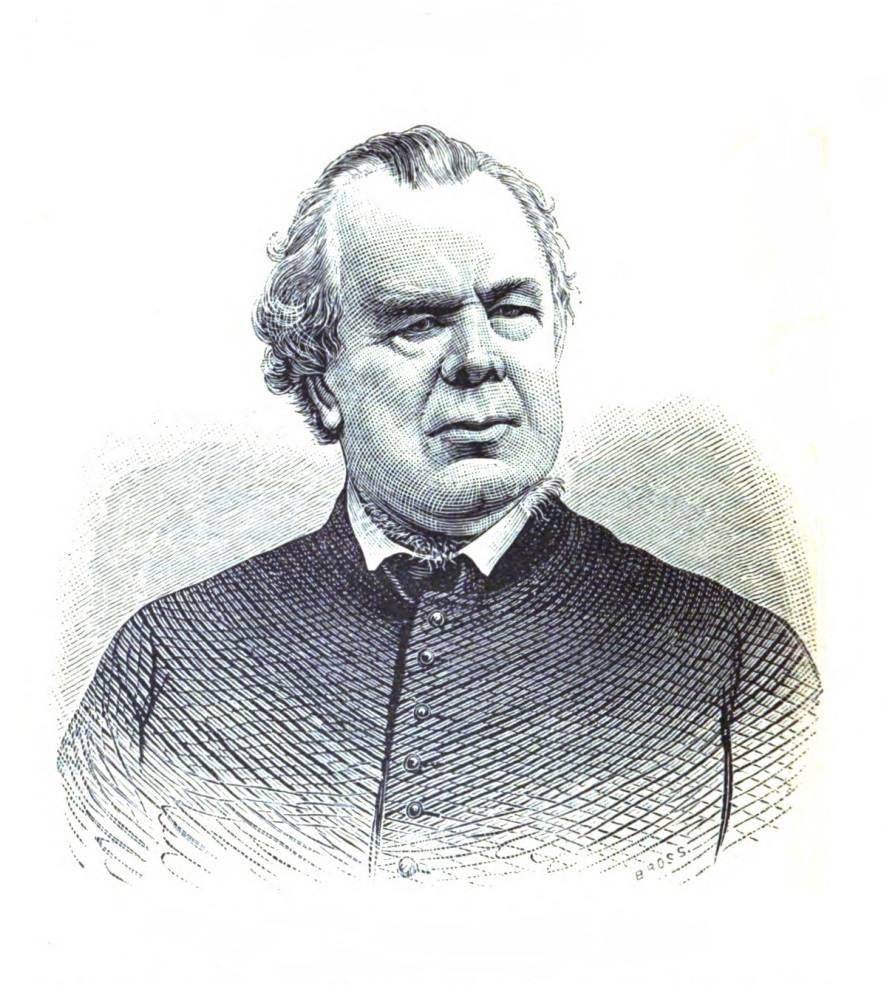
James Fitton.

James Fitton (10 April 1805 in Boston, Massachusetts, U.S.A. – 15 September 1881 in Boston) was one of New England’s foremost Roman Catholic missionary priests.

== Biography ==
His father, Abraham Fitton, went to Boston from Preston, England; his mother, Sarah Williams Fitton, was of Welsh origin and a Catholic convert. Abraham Fitton was a wheelwright. He became an altar boy at Holy Cross Cathedral where Bishop John de Cheverus encouraged him to enter the priesthood.

His primary education was received in the schools of his native city, and his classical course was made at Claremont, New Hampshire, at an academy conducted by Virgil Horace Barber, a Catholic convert. He learned theology from Bishop of Boston, Benedict Joseph Fenwick, by whom he was ordained priest, 23 December 1827.

In 1828, he was sent as a missionary to the Passamaquoddy people. He subsequently labored among the scattered Roman Catholics of New Hampshire and Vermont, and soon the territory between Boston and Long Island was placed under his charge, with Hartford, Connecticut, as the center of his district. There he edited a Catholic newspaper. He was instrumental in establishing the first Roman Catholic newspaper in the United States.

He traveled, often on foot, from Eastport and the New Brunswick line on the northeast, to Burlington and Lake Champlain on the northwest; from Boston in the east, to Great Barrington and the Berkshire Hills in the west; from Providence, Rhode Island and Newport, Rhode Island in the southeast, to Bridgeport and the New York State line in the southwest. During his missionary career, he was pastor of the first Catholic church at Hartford, and at Worcester, Massachusetts. By 1836, he had stationed his headquarters in Worcester. This was also the same year that the Penobscot Indians began making annual visits to St. John’s Parish, camping on Vernon Hill before returning to Maine.

In 1840, while pastor of the church at Worcester, he purchased the site of the College of the Holy Cross, and erected a boarding school for the advanced education of Catholic young men. In 1842, he sold the grounds and building to Bishop Fenwick, who placed it under the care of the Jesuits.

In 1848, he erected the Church of the Holy Name of Mary, Our Lady of the Isle at Newport. The church was designed by noted Brooklyn architect Patrick Keely. While serving at Fort Adams in Newport, Officer William Rosecrans, of the Corps of Engineers, volunteered his services as the engineer for the construction. Rosecrans had converted to Catholicism in 1845 while at West Point. St. Mary's was one of the largest churches constructed in the United States at that time, and is the oldest Catholic parish in the state.

In 1855 he was appointed by Bishop Fenwick pastor of the church of the Most Holy Redeemer in East Boston. Here he worked for the remaining twenty-six years of his life, and built four more churches.
