= Edward Fitton, the younger =

Englishman who took part in the Elizabethan plantation of Ireland

Sir Edward Fitton the younger (1548?–1606), was an Englishman who took part in the Elizabethan plantation of Ireland.

== Biography ==
Fitton was the son and heir of Sir Edward Fitton, the elder of Gawsworth, Cheshire and his wife Anne Warburton, daughter of Sir Peter Warburton and Elizabeth Winnington. His education included attending Brasenose College, Oxford, from which he graduated in 1566 with a BA, and then went on to Gray's Inn (1568).

Fitton was Receiver General for Ireland in 1579. His father died in July that year and, being disappointed in his expectation of succeeding his father as Vice-Treasurer of Ireland, he retired to England shortly after having been knighted by Sir William Pelham in 1580.

Sir Edward was returned as a member of parliament (MP) for Wigan, Lancashire in 1572, as MP for Boroughbridge, Yorkshire in 1588.

Sir Edward's interest in Ireland revived when it was proposed to colonise Munster with Englishmen, and he was one of the first to solicit a slice of the forfeited estates of the Gerald FitzGerald, Earl of Desmond. On 3 September 1587 Sir Edward passed his patent for 11,515 acres in the counties of Limerick, Tipperary, and Waterford; but the speculation proved to be not so profitable as he had anticipated, and on 19 December 1588 he wrote to William Cecil that he was £1,500 out of pocket through it, and begged that his rent might be remitted on account of his father's twenty years' service and his own. He was most energetic in his proposals for the extirpation of the Irish, but failed to fulfil the conditions of the grant, and was noted as an absentee.

Sir Edward was also active in the administration of districts close to his family seat of Gawsworth in Cheshire. From around 1583 he was a Justice of the Peace (JP) in Cheshire and Lancashire, Sheriff of Lancashire in 1591/92, and in 1601 mayor of Macclesfield. He died in London in March 1606 and was buried shortly after on 3 April at Gawsworth.

== Family ==
Sir Edward married Alice, daughter and sole heiress of Sir John Holcroft of Holcroft, Lancashire, who survived him until 5 February 1626, and who, after his death in 1606, erected a monument to his memory in Gawsworth Church.

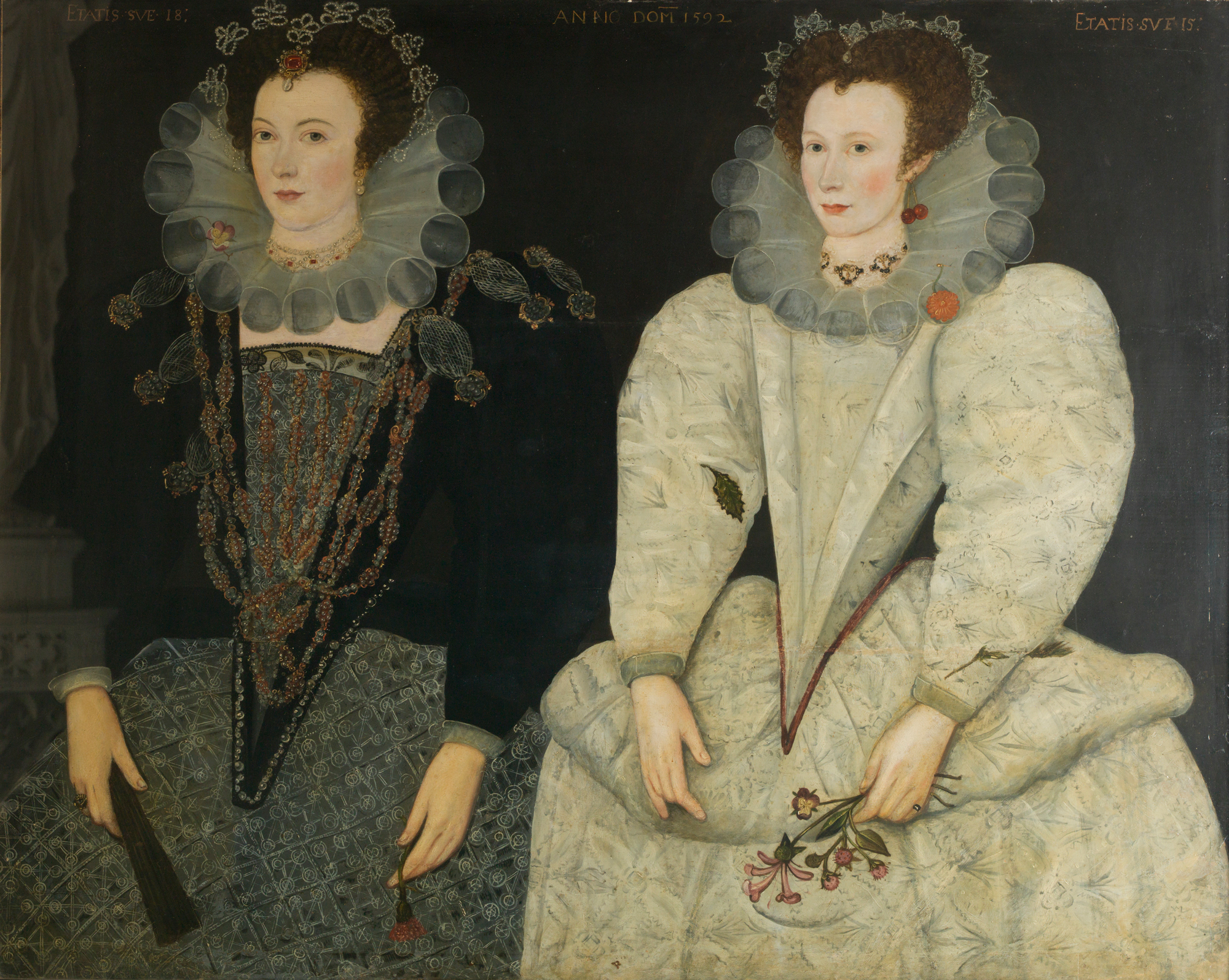
Double portrait by unknown artist of sisters Anne Newdigate and Mary Fitton in 1592

He was the father of Sir Edward Fitton (3 Dec 1572 – 10 May 1619), another son, Alexander, and daughters, Anne and Mary, who has been speculated as the "Dark Lady" of Shakespeare's sonnets. His direct male line ended in 1643, leading to a bitter inheritance dispute which went on for decades.
