= Edward Fitton, the elder =

English soldier, Lord President of Connaught (1527–1579)

Sir Edward Fitton the Elder (31 March 1527 – 3 July 1579), was Lord President of Connaught and Thomond and Vice-Treasurer of Ireland.

== Biography ==
Fitton was the eldest son of Sir Edward Fitton of Gawsworth (d. 1548) and Mary Harbottle, daughter and co-heiress of Sir Guiscard Harbottle of Horton, Northumberland. His father was knighted at the coronation of Anne Boleyn in May 1533.

In the Parliament of 1553 he sat as knight of the shire for Cheshire. He was knighted by Sir Henry Sidney in 1566.

With the establishment of provincial governments in Connaught and Munster, Fitton was appointed first Lord President of Connaught and Lord President of Thomond on 1 June 1569 arriving in Ireland in July and set up his seat at Michaelmas. He became besieged in Galway by Connor O'Brien, Earl of Thomond and the sons of Richard Burke, Earl of Clanricarde. Henry Sidney, Lord Deputy of Ireland sent a detachment to relieve the siege at Galway. With the siege broken, Edward with the relieving forces' assistance, together with Richard Burke, Earl of Clanricarde captured Shrule Castle, a place of strategical importance.

Attacked by Mac Uilliam Ochtair (Lord of Thomond), and the de Burghs and McDonnells of Mayo while camping at Shrule Castle, Fitton was unhorsed and severely wounded in the face. During the next few years, he captured many castles in Galway and Mayo. Edward gradually lost ground during 1571–72 with the de Burghs rising up in arms vigorously supported by a large body of Scottish gallowglasses. Believing that Richard Burke, Earl of Clanricarde was secretly instigating his rebellious sons, he had Richard arrested and clapped in irons at Dublin Castle.

A quarrel with Sir William Fitzwilliam, who had succeeded Sidney as Lord Deputy of Ireland, in relation to Richard Burke, Earl of Clanricarde's imprisonment, occurred. After six months of imprisonment, Clanricarde was released, whereupon he showed his loyalty by hanging his own son, his brother's son, his cousin-German's son, one of the captains of his own galloglasses and fifty of his followers that bore armour and weapons. Fitton, meanwhile, was besieged within Athlone Castle and requested reinforcement or to be relieved of his government. In early 1572, Athlone Castle was burnt to the ground, and Fitton was recalled to Dublin where the office of Lord President of Connaught and Lord President of Thomond were put into abeyance.

Returning to England in 1572, Fitton resided on the family estates at Gawsworth Old Hall, Cheshire. He was appointed Vice-Treasurer and Treasurer at Wars in December 1572. On 25 March 1573, he returned to Dublin in charge of Gerald FitzGerald, Earl of Desmond, and entered upon his duties as treasurer. Shortly afterwards a fresh quarrel broke out between Edward and Fitzwilliam, Lord Deputy of Ireland which was mediated by Queen Elizabeth I. On 18 June he was commissioned, along with Richard Burke, the Earl of Clanricarde, William O'Mullally, the Archbishop of Tuam, and others, to hold court hearings in Connaught.

Upon his return from Connaught, Fitton accompanied William Fitzwilliam to Kilkenny, where he was requested to proceed into Munster and endeavour to prevent the disturbances likely to arise there owing to the escape from Dublin Castle of Gerald FitzGerald, Earl of Desmond, which he refused.

In May 1575 he escorted Gerald FitzGerald, the Earl of Kildare and his two sons suspected of treason to England. Edward returned in September with Sir Henry Sidney, Fitzwilliam's successor as Lord Deputy of Ireland and went on the northern expedition. In April 1578 he created a scene at the Irish Council refusing to agree that there had been an increase in the revenue and was only supported by Sir William Drury, Lord Justice to the Irish Council.

== Death ==
Fitton died on 3 July 1579 from a disease caught during an expedition into Longford. He was buried on 21 September in St. Patrick's Cathedral, Dublin beside his wife, Anne (née Warburton), Lady Fitton. His eldest son and heir was Edward (1548?–1606).

== Family ==
Fitton married Anne Warburton, the second daughter of Sir Peter Warburton, of Areley in the county of Chester and his wife Elizabeth Winnington (who was born 1 May 1527) on Sunday 19 January 1539 (when she was aged just 12). They lived together for 34 years before she died on 9 January 1573. They had 15 children, 9 sons and 6 daughters, including Edward junior, Alexander, grandfather of Alexander Fitton, Lord Chancellor of Ireland, Margaret, mother of the statesman Sir Philip Mainwaring, and a daughter who married Philip's distant cousin Roger Mainwaring, Baron of the Court of Exchequer (Ireland). The senior Fitton line died out in 1643, leading to a bitter struggle for possession of Gawsworth between two junior branches of his descendants, the Gerards and the Fittons of Limerick, which lasted for more than forty years
