= Birchenough =

Birchenough is a surname. Notable people with the surname include:

- John Birchenough (1825 – 1895), English businessman and local politician
- Henry Birchenough (1853–1937), English businessman and public servant
- Godwin Birchenough (1880–1953), British priest
- William Taylor Birchenough (1891–1962), Pioneering British aviator
- William Anthony Birchenough (1925– 2012), Cave explorer
- Birchenough Baronets
