= Warren, Cheshire =

Coordinates: 53.23°N 2.17°W

Warren
- Location within Cheshire
- OS grid reference: SJ888688
- Civil parish: Gawsworth
- Unitary authority: Cheshire East
- Ceremonial county: Cheshire
- Region: North West
- Country: England
- Sovereign state: United Kingdom
- Post town: MACCLESFIELD
- Postcode district: SK11
- Dialling code: 01625
- Police: Cheshire
- Fire: Cheshire
- Ambulance: North West
- UK Parliament: Macclesfield

Warren is the traditional name for the largest settlement in the civil parish of Gawsworth in Cheshire, England. It is situated just to the north west of Gawsworth church and hall, and approximately 3 miles (4.8 km) south of the market town of Macclesfield. Nowadays the name is seldom used, the inhabitants usually saying that they live in Gawsworth.
