= Gawsworth New Hall =

Country house in Gawsworth, Cheshire, England

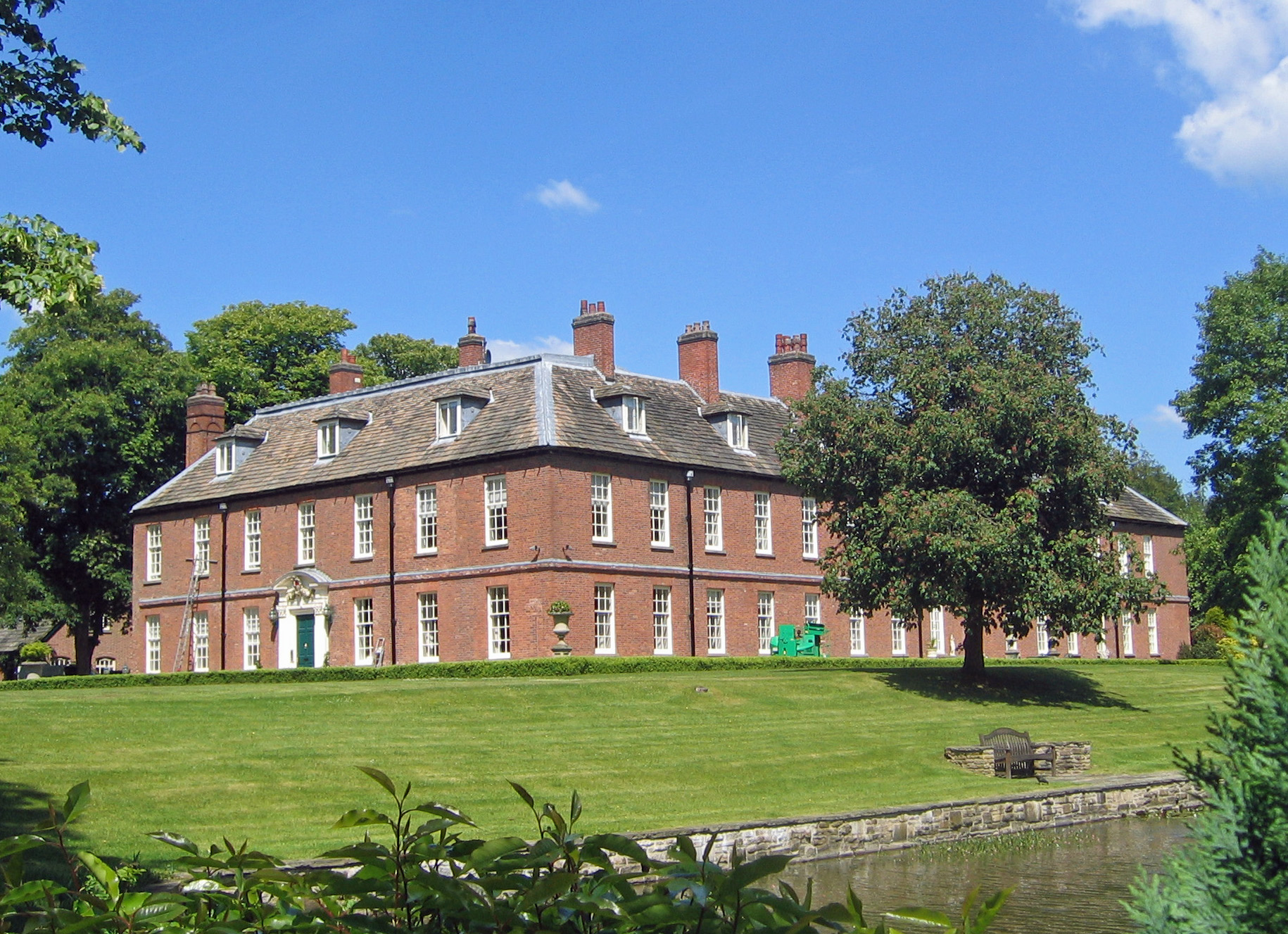
- Gawsworth New Hall

- Location in Cheshire
- 53.2255°N 2.1633°W
- Location: Gawsworth, Cheshire, England
- OS grid reference: SJ 891 698

History
- Built: 1707
- Built for: Lord Mohun

Listed Building – Grade II*
- Designated: 14 April 1967
- Reference no.: 1159278

Gawsworth New Hall is a country house in the village of Gawsworth, Cheshire, England. It is recorded in the National Heritage List for England as a designated Grade II* listed building.

The house was begun by Lord Mohun in 1707 but abandoned after he was killed in a duel with the Duke of Hamilton in 1712. Later additions and alterations were made including those to the designs of Sir Hubert Worthington in 1914. Late-19th-century residents of the house included William Taylor Birchenough, a Macclesfield silk manufacturer and partner in the Macclesfield firm John Birchenough & Son, who was the brother of Sir Henry Birchenough. W. T. Birchenough lived in the house with his wife Jane Birchenough, daughter of Richard Peacock MP and their four children. His youngest son, also William Taylor Birchenough, was a pioneering aviator and test pilot. The house is built in red brick with a stone slate roof. It has two storeys and attic with an E-shaped plan. The garden front has 16 bays. In the 1960s the hall was given over to Cheshire County Council and became a home for elderly women who were either physically, or mentally disabled. There was a large staff of carers, chefs, domestics and gardeners who looked after the residents and the grounds. In the 1980s it also took in elderly men too. A lot of the local people who lived in Gawsworth village worked at the hall. In the mid-1980s the hall was closed and put up for sale, and after being sold the hall was turned into apartments.

== See also ==
- Gawsworth Old Hall
- Grade II* listed buildings in Cheshire East
- Listed buildings in Gawsworth
