= George Baguley =

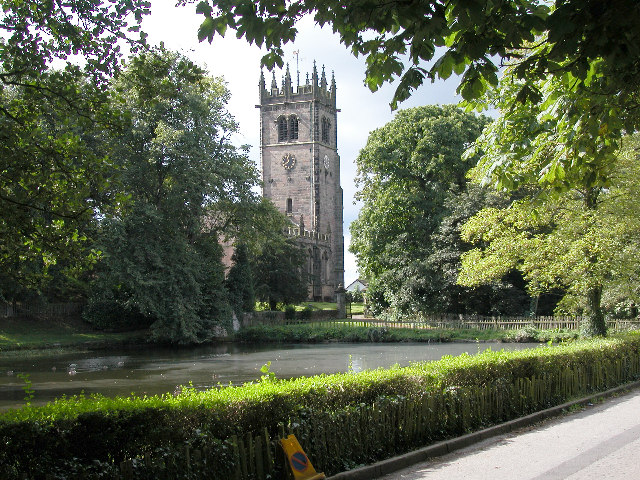
St James' Church, in Gawsworth. The nave was constructed c. 1430.

George Baguley was the rector of St James' Church, in Gawsworth, Cheshire, from 1470 to his death in 1497. The knight Sir Thomas Fytton (Fitton) of Gawsworth Old Hall served as Baguley's patron. This enabled Baguley to build the Gawsworth Old Rectory about 1470. Baguley's date of birth is unknown.

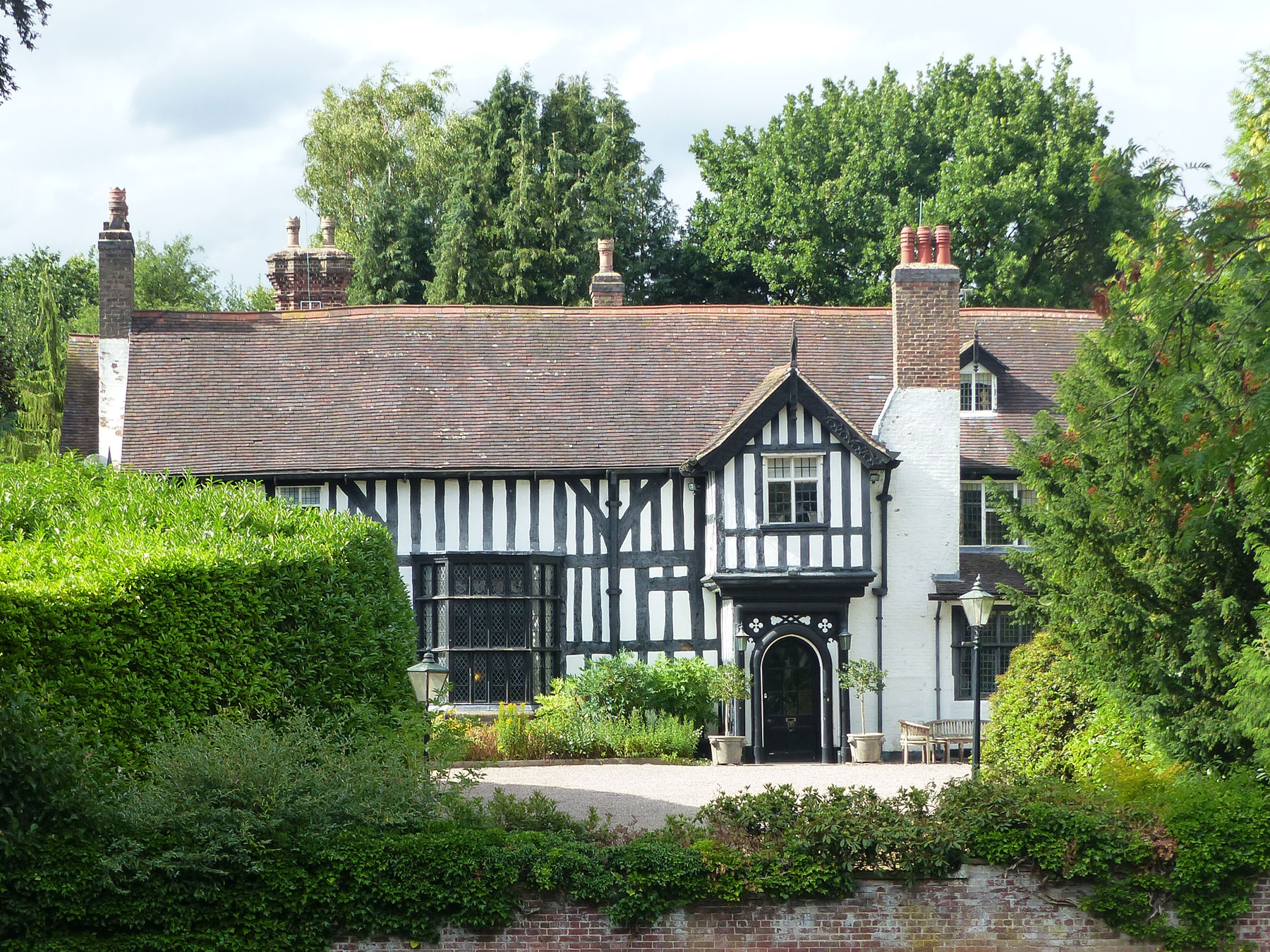
The Old Rectory, in Gawsworth. Baguley built the rectory in c. 1470, with money from his patron, Sir Thomas Fytton.

An original manuscript belonging to Baguley, containing prayers and musical notations, was passed to the rector of Tredington, William Durham, and in turn to the celebrated bishop and academic Thomas Barlow (1607–1691). Barlow bequeathed Baguley's manuscript to the Bodleian Library of Oxford, where it remains in the collection of medieval manuscripts.
