= Listed buildings in Gawsworth =

Gawsworth is a civil parish in Cheshire East, England. It contains 20 buildings that are recorded in the National Heritage List for England as designated listed buildings. Of these, three are listed at Grade I, the highest grade, two are listed at Grade II*, the middle grade, and the others are at Grade II. Apart from the village of Gawsworth, the parish is rural. The most important buildings in the parish, all listed at Grade I, are Gawsworth Old Hall and associated structures, St James' Church, also with associated structures, and the Old Rectory. Listed at Grade II* are Gawsworth New Hall and an associated barn. The Macclesfield Canal runs through the parish, and there are three listed structures associated with this, two bridges and a milestone. The other listed buildings are houses, farm buildings, a grave, a public house, a war memorial, and a boundary stone.

== Key ==
Grade	Criteria
I	Buildings of exceptional interest, sometimes considered to be internationally important
II*	Particularly important buildings of more than special interest
II	Buildings of national importance and special interest

== Buildings ==
Name and location	Photograph	Date	Notes	Grade
Gawsworth Old Hall; 53.22384°N 2.16380°W		15th century	A country house partly timber-framed with wattle and daub and brick infill and partly in brick. The roofs are in Kerridge stone slate. It is in two and three storeys, and forms three sides of a courtyard. Its features include mullioned and transomed windows, an oriel window, bay windows, and gables with decorative bargeboards. The house contains items of historical interest from other houses that have been demolished.	I
St James' Church; 53.22415°N 2.16606°W		15th century	The church is built in sandstone with stone roofs, and is in Perpendicular style. It consists of a wide nave and chancel, a south porch, and a west tower. The tower has niches, gargoyles, eight pinnacles, and coats of arms. The body of the church is embattled and has more pinnacles. Inside the church are memorials to the Fitton family.	I
Gawsworth Old Rectory; 53.22495°N 2.16661°W		c. 1470	The rectory has been converted into a private house. It is timber-framed with rendered infill and tiled roofs. A north wing was added in 1873–74 by R. Norman Shaw. The house is in two storeys with an attic. The features include an oriel window, canted bay windows, and gables with decorative bargeboards. Inside the house is a two-bay hall open to the roof.	I
Cross base 53.22403°N 2.16603°W		15th or 16th century	The cross base in the churchyard of St James' Church is in sandstone. It consists of a two-stepped plinth rising to an octagonal base with carved beasts' heads at the corners. On this is set an octagonal shaft carrying a 20th-century circular wooden cross. The cross base is also a scheduled monument.	II
Garden walls 53.22155°N 2.16355°W		16th century	The walls encircle the garden to the south of Gawsworth Old Hall. They are in brick with stone dressings. They have a rectangular plan, with a bowed wall at the southern end. There are two blocked pedestrian entries.	II
Old Crowholt Farmhouse; 53.20811°N 2.13918°W		1663	The farmhouse is built in stone and has a stone slate roof. There are later alterations and additions. The farmhouse is in two storeys with an attic, and there is a central projecting wing. One of the windows is mullioned, and another is circular.	II
Harrington Arms; 53.22236°N 2.17093°W		17th century	A public house in brick with stone slate roofs. It consists of an original block, with a later cross-wing to the left, and additions in the angle between them. The original block is in three storeys, and has a two-bay front. The cross-wing is in two storeys, also with two bays. The windows are casements.	II
The Gatehouse; 53.22433°N 2.16330°W		Mid- to late 17th century	A brick house with stone dressings on a stone plinth and with a stone slate roof. It is in two storeys, and has a three-bay front. To the right of the centre is a projecting gabled bay containing a circular clock face, which was added later. The windows are casements, some with mullioned or mullioned and transomed surrounds.	II
Gate piers to hall 53.22421°N 2.16377°W		Late 17th to early 18th century	The gate piers are at the entrance to Gawsworth Old Hall. They are in stone, and consist of two square piers with moulded plinths. On the tops are caps with ball finials.	II
Gawsworth New Hall; 53.22548°N 2.16338°W		1707–12	The house was begun by Lord Mohun but was largely abandoned after he was killed in a famous duel in 1712. It was extended and altered in 1914 by Hubert Worthington, creating an E-shaped plan. The house is built in brick with stone slate roofs. It is in two storeys with an attic, and has a garden front of 16 bays, and a left side of seven bays. Most of the windows are sashes. In the attic are hipped dormers.	II*
Barn, New Hall Farm; 53.22588°N 2.16350°W		c. 1707–12	The barn is built in brick with a stone slate roof. It is in two storeys, and has a front of nine bays. In the centre is an archway, and the walls contain ventilation slits.	II*
Watch tower 53.22529°N 2.16019°W		Early 18th century	This originated as a pigeon loft, and was later converted into a house. It is in brick with a stone slate roof, and has three storeys. The windows are a mix of sashes and casements.	II
Gate piers to church 53.22436°N 2.16589°W		Early to mid-18th century	The gate piers are at the northeast entrance to the churchyard of St James' Church. They are in stone, and consist of two square piers on projecting plinths. On the front and the rear of the piers are carved reliefs of skull and crossbones. On the caps are two balls, one above the other.	II
Maggoty Johnson's Grave; 53.22858°N 2.16800°W		1773	Samuel "Maggoty" Johnson was a playwright and professional jester who lived and died in Gawsworth Old Hall. His tomb is in woodland near the hall and consists of a tomb-slab on a 20th-century plinth. The tomb-slab is inscribed with a poem, probably written by himself. Adjacent is a 19th-century slab inscribed with a corrective message.	II
Underbank Farmhouse; 53.24265°N 2.17771°W	—	Early 19th century	The farmhouse is built in brick with a slate roof. It is in two storeys and has a symmetrical three-bay front. There is a central arched doorway with a fanlight. The windows are casements.	II
Bridge No 50; 53.21482°N 2.13322°W		c. 1830	An accommodation bridge over the Macclesfield Canal, the engineer being William Crosley. It is built in sandstone and consists of a horseshoe elliptical arch with voussoirs and a keystone. The approach walls end in square piers. The parapet is coped.	II
Bridge No 52; 53.20902°N 2.14008°W		c. 1830	An accommodation bridge over the Macclesfield Canal leading to Crowholt Farm, the engineer for which was William Crosley. It is built in sandstone and consists of a horseshoe elliptical arch with voussoirs and a keystone. The approach walls end in square piers. The parapet is coped.	II
Canal milestone 53.21450°N 2.13385°W		c. 1830	The milestone stands by the towpath of the Macclesfield Canal. It is in sandstone with a shaped top. Inscribed on the appropriate faces are the distances in miles to Hall Green and Marple.	II
Boundary stone 53.21350°N 2.10723°W	—	1849 (probable)	A boundary stone in red sandstone. It has a triangular plan with a rounded head, and is inscribed with the initials of the parishes and the date.	II
War memorial 53.23092°N 2.16876°W		1920	The war memorial, designed by Frederick Etchells, stands at a road junction, and consists of a timber Calvary on a stone plinth. It has an octagonal shaft, the figure of Jesus is about 2 metres (6 ft 7 in) tall, and above it is a roof with copper flashings. On the plinth are inscriptions and the names of those lost in the two World Wars.	II

== See also ==
- Listed buildings in Bosley
- Listed buildings in Henbury
- Listed buildings in Macclesfield
- Listed buildings in Marton
- Listed buildings in North Rode
- Listed buildings in Siddington
- Listed buildings in Sutton
