= Gawsworth Old Hall =

Historic house museum in Cheshire, England

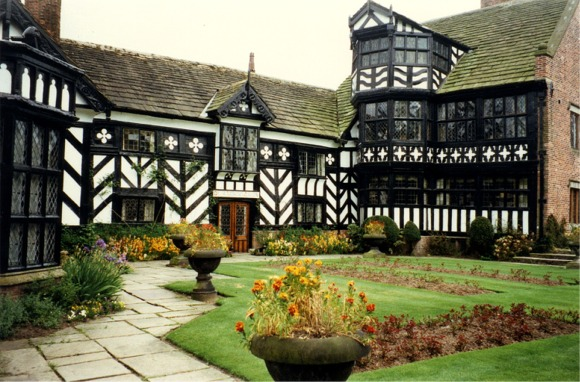
- Gawsworth Old Hall

- Location in Cheshire
- 53.2238°N 2.1638°W
- Location: Gawsworth, Cheshire, England
- OS grid reference: SJ 891 696

Listed Building – Grade I
- Designated: 25 July 1952
- Reference no.: 1139500

Gawsworth Old Hall is a Grade I listed country house in the village of Gawsworth, Cheshire, England. It is a timber-framed house in the Cheshire black-and-white style. The present house was built between 1480 and 1600, replacing an earlier Norman house. It was probably built as a courtyard house enclosing a quadrangle, but much of it has been demolished, leaving the house with a U-shaped plan.

Notable residents have included Mary Fitton, perhaps the "Dark Lady" of Shakespeare's sonnets, and Samuel "Maggoty" Johnson, a playwright described as the last professional jester in England, whose grave is nearby in Maggoty Wood, a small National Trust woodland. In 1712 a dispute about the ownership of the Gawsworth estate culminated in a celebrated duel, in which both the combatants were killed.

The hall is surrounded by formal gardens and parkland, which once comprised an Elizabethan pleasure garden and, possibly, a tilting ground for jousting. The grounds are listed Grade II*, and contain four Grade II listed buildings, including the gatehouse, gatepiers, and garden walls. The hall and grounds are open to the public at advertised times, and events are organised. During the summer months a series of concerts and other entertainment is arranged in an open-air theatre near the hall.

== History ==
The original house on the site dated from the Norman era. The earliest documentary reference is the granting of a licence for the administration of a chapel within the house in 1365. The house was then owned by Thomas Fitton, who had inherited it by marriage in 1316, and it remained in the possession of the Fitton family until 1611. The original house was replaced in the 15th and 16th centuries. Building started in 1480, and continued in stages until about 1600. Since then, parts of the house have been demolished, and others have been considerably altered. It is considered by the architectural historians Peter de Figueiredo and Julian Treuherz that the site of the house was originally moated, and that its plan was that of a quadrangle, forming a courtyard house.

In 1579 the house was inherited by Sir Edward Fitton III on the death of his father, Sir Edward Fitton II. Sir Edward III was the father of Mary Fitton, a maid of honour to Queen Elizabeth and a candidate for the "Dark Lady" of Shakespeare's sonnets. Following the death of Sir Edward Fitton, 2nd Baronet in 1643, the estate passed to Charles Gerard, later the first Earl of Macclesfield. There was a dispute about the legal ownership of the estate between Sir Charles and his cousin Alexander Fitton, which was resolved in Sir Charles's favour in 1663. Demolition of parts of the house took place in about 1700, and it is thought by de Figueiredo and Treuherz that the west range was removed, possibly including the gatehouse. At the beginning of the 18th century the dispute between the Fittons and the Gerards resurfaced, culminating in a duel in Hyde Park, London, in 1712 between the rival claimants: Lord Mohun, from the Gerard family, and the 4th Duke of Hamilton, from the Fittons. Both of the combatants were killed. The estate remained with the Gerards, until it was bought by William Stanhope, who later became the first Earl of Harrington, and it remained with this family until 1935. The house was owned by the Cheshire antiquary Raymond Richards until his death in 1978. Richards collected items from historic buildings that were being demolished in the 1960s, either incorporating them into the house or displaying them in the grounds. The house is still owned and run by the Richards family.

== Architecture ==
=== Exterior and plan ===
Gawsworth Old Hall is a timber-framed house in the Cheshire black-and-white tradition, roofed in Kerridge sandstone. It has been estimated that the weight of the roof may be in excess of 300 long tons (300 t). The house is in mainly in two storeys. In the north range, and on the south front, the timber frame has been encased in brick, with timbering applied to its outer surface. Internally the roof trusses have been retained. Its plan is that of a U-shape with its open side facing the west, towards what was the courtyard. The main entrance is in the north range, leading into the Entrance Hall. To the west of this is the Library, and to the east, the Morning Room. The Entrance Hall leads into the longest range, the eastern range, consisting of the Long Hall, at the north end, and the Dining Room. The Long Hall was originally the Great Hall, and was open to the roof, but is now divided into two floors. To the east of the range extend the kitchen and the chapel. The Dining Room leads into a room now known as the Green Room, which is canted ten degrees to the east. This was also originally open to the roof, but was not a great hall. De Figueiredo and Treuherz are of the opinion that this was originally a larger, separate structure, probably a barn, and incorporated into the main building when the east range was built. Little of the south range remains. It originally contained domestic apartments, which formerly extended to join the now-demolished west range. In the angle between the Dining Room and what remains of the south range is the Drawing Room. The special feature of this room is a canted bay window on the north side, extending upwards for three storeys. The only dated item in the building is the Fitton coat of arms on the north front, which was carved by Richard Rany in 1570.

=== Interior ===
Many of the original features have been lost as a consequence of the many changes that have taken place over the centuries. Additional features have been added to the interior by Raymond Richards, such as the doorcase around the entrance. The Entrance Hall has retained its medieval shape and low ceiling. It contains the coat of arms of the Richards family and items of weaponry, including a decorative suit of armour dating from the 19th century and moved here from Scarisbrick Hall. To the west of the Entrance Hall is the Library. This is in the shape of a double cube, measuring 16 feet (4.9 m) by 32 feet (9.8 m). Its major item is a richly carved Tudor chimneypiece. The bookcases were designed by A. W. N. Pugin. Both of these items were moved here by Raymond Richards, the bookcases coming from Scarisbrick Hall. The bookcases contain a comprehensive collection of books relating to Cheshire. In a corner cabinet is a flint axe head dating from about 2000 BC. This was discovered in the park nearby in 1912. To the south of the Entrance Hall is the Long Hall. This has retained the fireplace and ceiling introduced in the Tudor era. The hall contains items of antique furniture, and paintings by David Wilkie, J. M. W. Turner and John Constable. To the south of the Long Hall is the principal staircase, which was remodelled in 1920. The area around the staircase contains a Waterford glass chandelier dating from about 1780, and a portrait of the first Earl of Harrington by Allan Ramsay. From this area, a door leads into the chapel. This is the third or fourth chapel in the house, and was dedicated to Thomas More when he was canonised in 1935. Much of the woodwork in it dates from 1803. Many of the ornaments in the chapel were brought here by Richards from a redundant church in Ipswich. Two marble plaques in the chapel are by Thomas Thornycroft, a sculptor born in the nearby village. Alongside the chapel is an ambulatory or baptistry which contains a font and items of stained glass, made by Morris & Co. and designed by Edward Burne-Jones. These were obtained by Richards from All Saints Church, Birkenhead. They depict the Crucifixion, and Saints Agnes, George, Stephen and Alban. The south door contains fragments of ancient glass from Plas Newydd in Llangollen that were originally in a medieval church. Adjacent to the chapel is a conservatory containing marble sculptures by John Warrington Wood.

To the south of the Long Hall is the Dining Room, which is little changed since the Tudor era. Its contents include a 16th-century refectory table, an oak escritoire from about 1650, and items of Wedgwood majolica ware made in about 1830. The Dining Room leads to the small Guard Room, which contains two 17th-century chairs and an 18th-century blunderbuss. To the west of this is the Drawing Room, the principal living room of the hall, which has been little altered since the middle of the 16th century. To the south of the Drawing Room is a small room known as the Gold Room. This room has retained a frieze dating from the early 16th century, including carvings of Tudor roses, flowers and birds. Also in the room is a bust of Charles Gerard. In the southeast corner of the hall is the Green Room. This contains a painting of Gawsworth Rectory by Charles Tattershall Dodd, and a complete set of a dinner service by Minton, comprising 120 pieces.

A staircase from the east of the Guard Room leads to the Gallery on the upper floor, to the south side of which is the Solar, containing a 16th-century four-poster bed known as the Boswell bed. It was formerly in Lympne Castle, Kent. The house's principal bedroom is the Hall Room, much of which has survived from the early 16th century. It contains a four-poster bed from the era of William and Mary and a portrait by Zuccaro of members of the Fitton family, which was formerly in Brereton Hall. A room next to the Hall Room has been converted into a modern bathroom, next to which is Mary Fitton's Bedroom, which contains an old plaster frieze. The other rooms on floor are the French Room, containing an 18th-century French bed, and a small bedroom known as the Griffin Room. Adjacent to this is the Billiard Room, which has exposed roof timbers. As well as the billiard table, the room contains a marble sculpture of Echo by Alfred Gatley and a bust of John Milton.

== Grounds ==
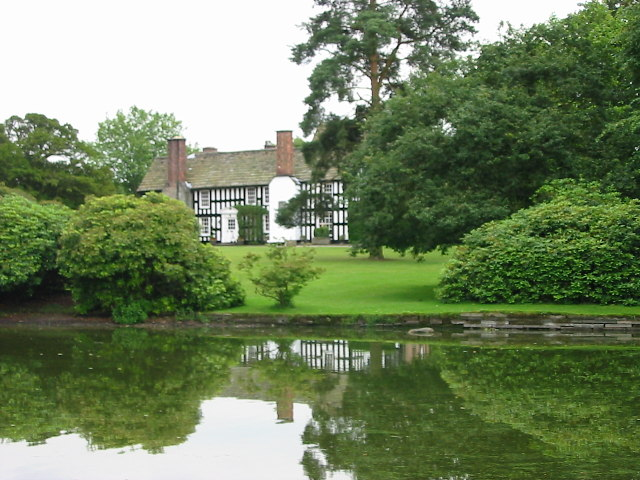
Gawsworth Old Hall from the north

=== Gardens ===
Associated with the house is an inner garden of about 30 acres (12 ha) surrounded by a parkland of about 600 acres (240 ha); both are enclosed by walls. To the south of the hall the inner garden comprises a modern formal garden occupying the site of the original 16th-century formal garden. Beyond this, in the parkland, are the earthworks of an earlier garden. The parkland is almost square in shape, with a section curving out from the south border. It consists of "one huge grassed area" with "lumps and bumps". The Cheshire historian George Ormerod, writing in 1819, considered that this area contained a tilting ground for jousting. That claim is repeated in the hall's official guidebook, which goes on to suggest that it was created in the hope that Queen Elizabeth I would visit the hall on her royal progress, but she never did so. There is some doubt regarding the dating of the creation of the garden, but it is generally accepted that it comprised an Elizabethan pleasure garden. A raised mound of earth in the southwest corner of the garden would have been used to view the garden from an elevated position. A corresponding mound at the southeast corner was removed during the Second World War. To the west of the hall a wooded area known as the Rookery contains mature lime trees. Limited excavation work carried out in 1989–90 discovered, inter alia, a filled-in canal running north–south down the centre of the garden. The excavations provided "a tremendous insight into the past, although not enough to date it with certainty". To the north of the hall are four fish ponds.

=== Structures ===
Four structures in the grounds around the hall are recorded in the National Heritage List for England as a designated Grade II listed buildings; Grade II listing means that a building or structure is considered to be "of special interest". The 17th-century gatehouse is constructed in brick with ashlar dressings and a stone slate roof, in two storeys and three bays. The gate piers date from the late 17th or early 18th century. They are in painted ashlar surmounted by 20th-century ball finials. The garden walls were built in the 16th century, with later additions and alterations. They are constructed in brick with ashlar dressings. At the southern end is a large rectangular enclosure. In nearby woodland are the grave and memorial to Samuel "Maggoty" Johnson, a playwright said to have been the last professional jester in England, who lived in the hall and died in 1773 aged 82. A table tomb over the grave consists of an inscribed stone slab on a brick plinth. Adjacent to it is another inscribed stone slab, dating from the 19th century.

== Present day ==
Gawsworth Old Hall is south of the village of Gawsworth, 3 miles (5 km) southeast of Macclesfield. Immediately to the west is the Grade I listed Church of St James, to the north beyond a fish pond is the Grade II* listed Gawsworth New Hall, and nearby is the Grade I listed Gawsworth Old Rectory. The Old Hall was listed Grade I on 25 July 1952. Grade I listing is granted to buildings of "exceptional interest, sometimes considered to be internationally important", and encompasses only 2.5 per cent of all listed buildings. The grounds have been designated Grade II* in the National Register of Historic Parks and Gardens. Designation as Grade II* means that the site is "particularly important, of more than special interest".

The hall is open to the general public at advertised times. A series of events is held in the grounds and in the hall during the year. There is a licensed tea room in the grounds, and the hall is also licensed for civil weddings. Ceremonies are conducted in the Long Hall, and receptions can be held in a marquee in the grounds. During the summer months plays, concerts and other entertainments take place in the open-air theatre close to the hall.

== See also ==
- Grade I listed buildings in Cheshire East
- Listed buildings in Gawsworth
