= Leonard Montefiore =

Leonard Montefiore may refer to

- Leonard A. Montefiore (1853–1879), Jewish philanthropist
- Leonard G. Montefiore (1889–1961), Jewish philanthropist
