= Gawsworth Old Rectory =

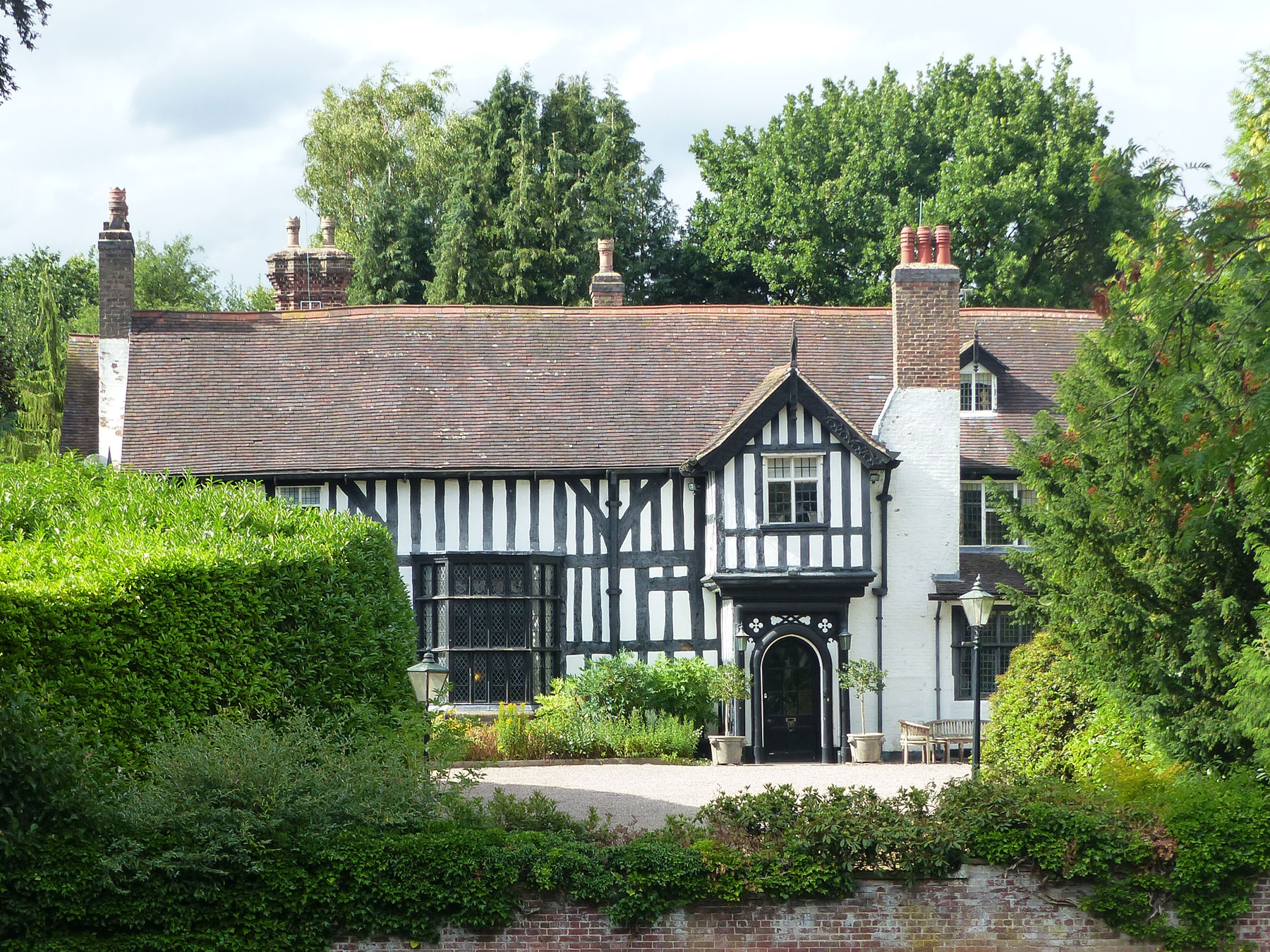
- Gawsworth Old Rectory

- Location in Cheshire
- 53.22495°N 2.16661°W
- OS grid reference: SJ 889 696

Listed Building – Grade I
- Designated: 25 July 1952
- Reference no.: 1139496

Gawsworth Old Rectory is a medieval house in the village of Gawsworth, Cheshire, England. It is known for the rare survival of its "open hall" and the notable 1873 restoration by Richard Norman Shaw, and is recorded in the National Heritage List for England as a designated Grade I listed building.

The Old Rectory was described as "an exceptionally fine timber-framed house" by Nikolaus Pevsner.

== History ==
Gawsworth Old Rectory was built as a rectory in c.1470 by the Gawsworth rector George Baguley, for the opposite St. James' Church. Sir Thomas Fytton (Fitton), of nearby Gawsworth Old Hall served as Baguley's patron, and may have helped to finance the rectory's construction. A dedicated inscription to the Fitton family exists built into one of the fireplaces.

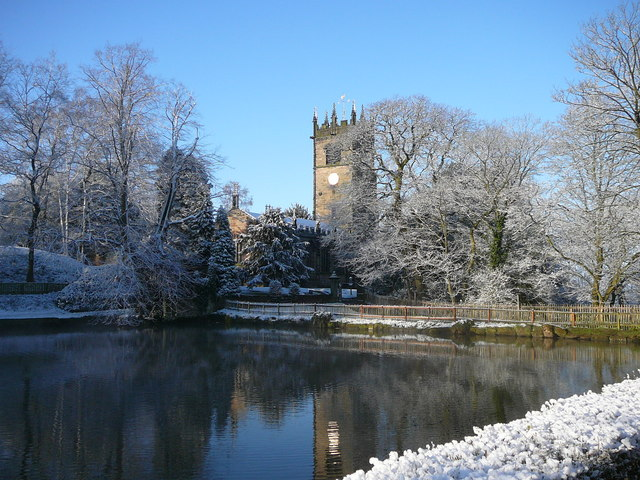
St James' Church, Gawsworth.

The house was restored first in c.1724 by rector William Hall, and then famously the second time in 1873 by the architect Richard Norman Shaw.

The house served as a rectory to St. James' Church until 1953, when rector John R. Harrison left, and the rectory was moved elsewhere. Gawsworth Old Rectory is now a private house, and not open to the public. It was sold in August 2016 for £3.25 million.

== Architecture ==
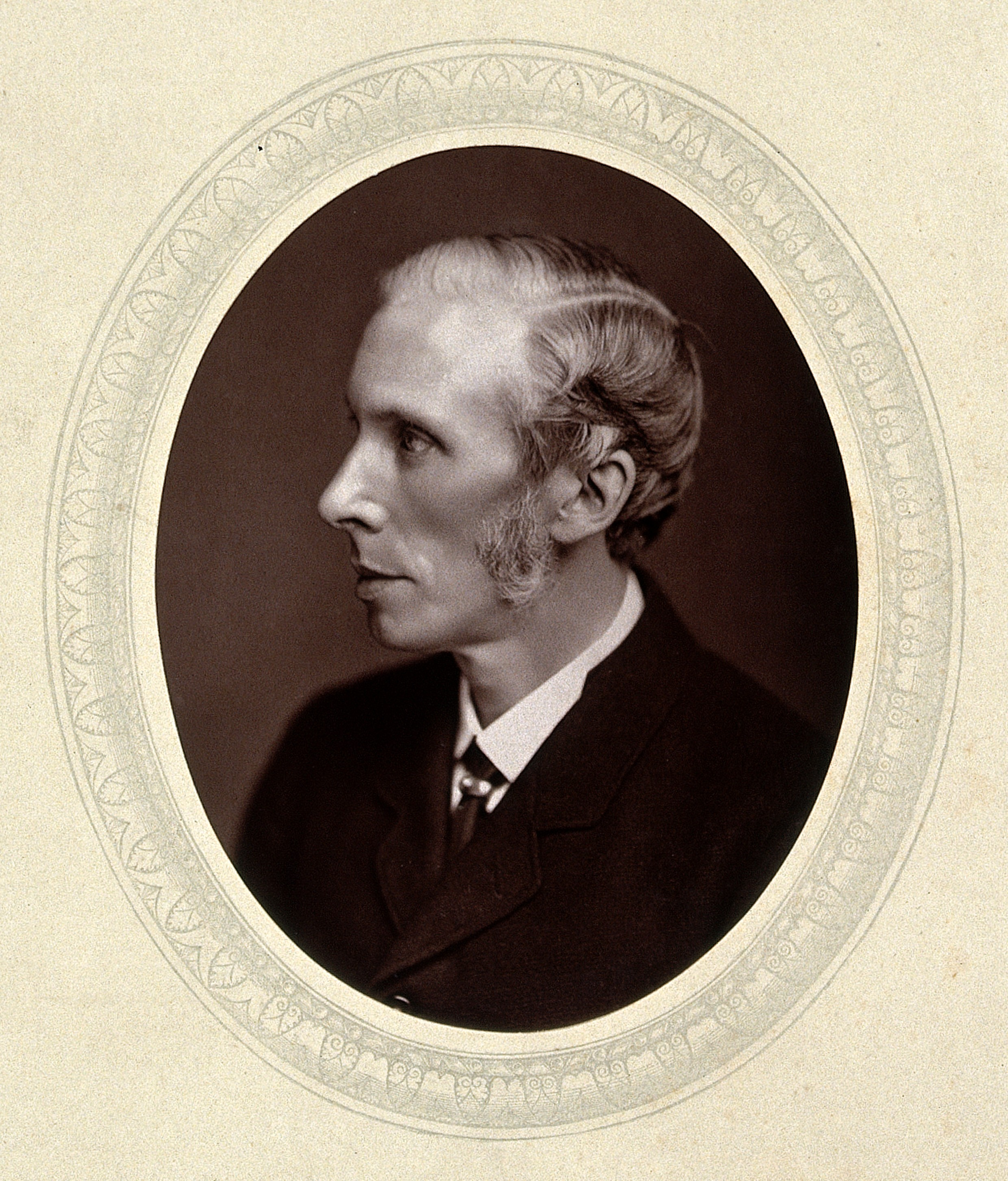
Richard Norman Shaw, who restored the Old Rectory in 1873.

The house is timber-framed, and it retains its hall open to the roof. Much of the timber framing is close studded and the roof is of plain tiles. Historic England describes the building as "one of the best preserved medium-sized houses of the period in Cheshire, particularly valuable for the survival of the open hall".

== See also ==
- Grade I listed buildings in Cheshire East
- Listed buildings in Gawsworth
