= Harrington Arms =

Listed pub in Gawsworth, Cheshire, England

- The pub in 2016

- Location in Cheshire

General information
- Type: Public house; originally a farmhouse
- Location: Church Lane Gawsworth, Cheshire, England
- Coordinates: 53.22236°N 2.17093°W
- Year built: Late 17th or early 18th century
- Renovated: 19th century (altered and added)
- Owner: Robinsons

Design and construction
- Designations

Listed Building – Grade II
- Official name: Harrington Arms public house
- Designated: 19 January 1976
- Reference no.: 1139461

Website
- Official website

The Harrington Arms is a Grade II listed public house on Church Lane in Gawsworth, a village in Cheshire, England. Occupying a former farmhouse on a working farm, it was first licensed as a pub in 1710. The present building dates from the late 17th or early 18th century and retains a largely unaltered historic interior, which has been recognised by the Campaign for Real Ale (CAMRA) as being of "outstanding national historic importance".

== History ==
The present building dates from the late 17th or early 18th century, with later alterations and additions made in the 19th century. It forms part of a working farm and occupies a former farmhouse that was first licensed as a public house in 1710. By the late 19th century, the Gawsworth estate was owned by the Stanhope family, Earls of Harrington, from whom the pub takes its name. For much of its history, the pub was associated with the farm, which remained in the ownership of the Bayley family until 2007. Members of the family managed both the pub and farm for more than a century, a period that contributed to the survival of the pub's largely unaltered interior. Robinsons Brewery acquired the pub in the 1930s and continues to own both it and the farm.

On 19 January 1976, the Harrington Arms was designated a Grade II listed building. It was included on the Campaign for Real Ale (CAMRA)'s National Inventory of Historic Pub Interiors before the inventory's grading system was revised. Under the revised scheme, it is rated three stars and its interior is regarded as being "of outstanding national historic importance".

== Architecture ==
=== Exterior ===
The pub is built of red brick with a stone-slate roof and prominent chimney stacks. Its oldest section, dating from the late 17th or early 18th century, is a substantial three-storey block, with later additions extending from one side. The public areas are arranged around a central passage, with bars occupying both the earlier and later parts of the building.

The main historic block has two bays and retains paired windows on each floor. Decorative brick bands run between the storeys and within the gables, while a number of former window openings remain visible in the side and rear walls. The 19th-century extension has two storeys and includes the principal entrance adjoining the earlier section.

=== Interior ===
The interior retains a traditional arrangement of separate public rooms that evolved from an earlier layout centred on a small serving area and the tap room. To the right of the entrance is a narrow bar room, which leads to two further drinking areas, while a tap room with fixed bench seating lies to the left. Red and black tiled flooring survives in the corridor and tap room. The staircase in the oldest part of the building dates from the late 17th or early 18th century and remains in place. The bar counter is simply finished with vertical timber boarding, although both the counter and bar back were refurbished in the late 20th century.

A former kitchen and living room was brought into use as a public room in 2007 and retains an early 20th-century cooking range together with other features of its earlier function. Two further small rooms, known as the Snug and the Parlour, survive, the latter having originally formed part of the private living quarters.

== See also ==
- Listed buildings in Gawsworth
