= Pištenik =

Mountain in Croatia

- Location within Croatia

Highest point
- Elevation: 800 m (2,600 ft)
- Coordinates: 45.035814°N 15.443552°E

Geography
- Location: Croatia
- Parent range: Dinaric Alps

Pištenik is a mountain in Croatia, located southeast of Plaški and northwest of Saborsko. Its highest peak is 800 metres (2,600 ft) high. It hosts a 328 m (1,076 ft) deep karst pit called Balinka. In the 1960s, members of the local mountaineering society "HPD Željezničar" surveyed 45 speleological sites there, including a cave called Estavela Begovac with a depth of 260 m (850 ft). In a 1964 expedition to the Balinka Pit of the Croatian speleologists joined by the South Wales Caving Club, William Anthony Birchenough reached a depth of almost 700 feet. Two years later a second expedition reached the bottom of the pit.

== See also ==
- List of deepest Dinaric caves
- List of Dinaric caves
- List of longest Dinaric caves
