= John Birchenough =

English silk manufacturer and politician

John Birchenough JP (1 November 1825 – 7 May 1895) was an English silk manufacturer and local politician in Macclesfield, Cheshire in the nineteenth century. He was the head of the Macclesfield silk manufacturing firm Birchenough and Sons with mills at Park Lane, Prestbury Road and Henderson Street in Macclesfield. He was a Wesleyan Methodist and was a supporter of local charities in Macclesfield. Birchenough was a member of the Macclesfield Town Council for nearly forty years during a time of great transformation for the town when many public works – such as the waterworks, the cemetery, enlargement of the Town Hall, extensions at the gasworks, and the transformation of the muddy streets into cleanly paved, and hard macadamized roads – were carried out.

Birchenough was a Liberal Unionist and served as Mayor of Macclesfield Town in 1875–76. His portrait hangs in Macclesfield old Town Hall.

== Silk industry ==
Birchenough started his career working with his elder brother Thomas Birchenough in the 1840s at Henderson Street Mill. Several years later he joined his father-in-law John Taylor in the business carried on at the Prestbury Road mills which became known as Taylor and Birchenough. When Taylor died, Birchenough retained the business and traded in his own name.

The next stage in his business career was the purchase of the Chester-road Mills, from the Manchester silk firm of Taylor, Harrop, and Pearce and the construction of a large shed to house power looms. During this period Birchenough also had a silk throwster business in partnership with Joseph Arnold, which they carried out at the Prestbury Road mills. After his partner's death Birchenough kept the business.

In the 1870s Birchenough purchased the extensive Park Lane mills from Henry Wardle. At this time the Chester Road mill and the Prestbury Road mill were both being worked by Birchenough. About fifteen years before his death he took his sons into partnership, and the firm was renamed John Birchenough & Sons.

In her book Three Visits to America the English women's rights activist Emily Faithfull writes the following about Birchenough's mills:

"No one could desire to see women looking more healthy than the operatives in some of our factories in Manchester, Bradford, and, Halifax. I shall long remember going through Messrs. Birchenough's silk mills at Macclesfield. Certainly the occasion was an exceptional one. The eldest son had been married the day before, and the entire place had been decorated by the operatives to commemorate the event. The walls were adorned by appropriate mottoes, even unique representations of the bridal ceremony had been devised, and everything betokened the happy understanding existing there between labor and capital."

Faithfull was a witness at the wedding of Birchenough's eldest son William Taylor Birchenough to Jane Peacock, daughter of Richard Peacock, and knew both families, dedicating the English edition of the same book to her "Friend Richard Peacock Esq of Gorton Hall" in 1884.

The firm had agencies in Paris and New York as well as London and by 1881 Birchenough employed 1,300 people in his mills.

Birchenough won a gold medal at the London Exhibition in 1862, and at the Paris Exhibition in 1857 he received honours. In 1887 he served on the executive committee attached to the silk section of the Manchester Royal Jubilee Exhibition.

== Politics ==
Birchenough was first elected to the Macclesfield Town Council on 17 November 1856 at a bye-election in No. 3 Ward where his business interests were centered. In 1857 his re-election was unopposed but in 1860, and again in 1863 the seats were contested. In the latter year Birchenough's colleague was J. B. Wadsworth, and the opposition was directed against the latter. T. Burgess stood at the top of the poll, with 484 votes, followed by Birchenough with 458, Wadsworth 322, and Samuel Brown, 176. In 1866 there was no contest, but in 1869 Birchenough had again to fight for his seat. His Liberal colleague on this occasion was Joseph Barclay, and they were opposed by J. Tunstall and W. Barnett. Birchenough received 521 votes, and Barclay 503, which placed them far ahead of their opponents.

Birchenough declined to enter the contest in 1872 for personal reasons.

On 11 June 1873 Birchenough again entered the council, this time elected as an alderman in the place of Abraham Bury, and as alderman he remained a member of the Town Council until his death.

In 1889 Birchenough had joined the Liberal Unionists, and the predominant Conservative Party secured his re-election. W. C. Brocklehurst and Birchenough received the unanimous vote of the council, but for the other four seats the Liberal Aldermen (Stancliffe, Wright, Hooley, and Rowbotham) were rejected by 22 votes to 19, and their places were taken by A. Hordern, J. W. H. Thorp, P. Colquhoun and J. Kershaw, the latter of whom had been selected from outside the council as mayor of the borough.

Birchenough was for many years a member of the Finance Committee, and succeeded Alderman Wadsworth as chairman.

In 1876 Birchenough was elected to the office of mayor and chief magistrate of Macclesfield. On the same day that he took office the council accepted a resolution moved by R. Brodrick, and seconded by Alderman Jackson, recommending that the names of R. Thorp, A. Hordern, G. R. Killmister, J. Birchenough, C. Brocklehurst, and J. Dawson, be forwarded to the Lord Chancellor for appointment as borough magistrates, and in due course the names were placed on the commission of the peace.

== Public bodies ==
Birchenough was a prolific supporter of local charities. He was governor of the Macclesfield Infirmary, a governor of the High School for Girls, a member of the committee of the Macclesfield Industrial School, vice chairman and an ex-president of the Chamber of Commerce, and in connection with the Wesleyan body, a member of the Circuit Finance Committee. He variously served at the chairman and president of Macclesfield Sunday School for over thirty years, and served as the chairman of Brunswick Chapel, chairman and president of the School of Art and the Technical School. He was particularly engaged in fundraising for the establishment of the Macclesfield School of Art and Science in 1876 and remained its president until 1882. He also served as chairman and treasurer of Mill Street Wesleyan School and supported the work of the "useful Knowledge Society".

== Family ==
Birchenough was married to Elizabeth Taylor, the daughter of John Taylor, another Macclesfield silk manufacturer. He lived in what The Drapery World described at the time of his death as "The Elms, a pretty mansion in Byrons' lane, Sutton, Macclesfield". His sons included William Taylor Birchenough of Gawsworth New Hall who married Jane Peacock, daughter of Richard Peacock M.P, a founder of Beyer Peacock, and Sir John Henry Birchenough who married the novelist Mabel Bradley, daughter of George Granville Bradley, the Dean of Westminster, and Major Walter Edwin Birchenough, father of Godwin Birchenough, Dean of Ripon. Birchenough's eldest grandson, Richard Peacock Birchenough, married Dorothy Grace Godsal, daughter of Philip Thomas Godsal, inventor of the Godsal anti-tank rifle. His youngest grandson William Taylor Birchenough played in Fowler's Match in 1910 and was an aviation pioneer.
