= George Macartney (British Army officer) =

Irish army officer

Lieutenant-General George Macartney

Governor of Portsmouth
- In office 1719–1730

Governor of Berwick-upon-Tweed
- In office 1718–1719

Personal details
- Born: 1660 Belfast
- Died: 7 July 1730 (aged 69–70) London
- Spouse: Anne Douglas
- Parent(s): George Macartney; Martha Davies

Military service
- Rank: Lieutenant-General
- Commands: Colonel; Carabiniers
- Battles/wars: Nine Years War; War of the Spanish Succession; Almansa (WIA) (POW); Siege of Douai; Siege of Béthune

Lieutenant-General George Macartney (or MacCartney; c. 1660–1730) was an Irish-born professional soldier who went into exile to escape charges for his role in the 1712 Hamilton–Mohun duel. He was later acquitted and restored to his military rank.

== Personal details ==
George Macartney was born in 1660, elder son of "Black George" Macartney (1630–1702), a wealthy Belfast merchant, and Martha (died 1705), daughter of Sir John Davies, Attorney-General for Ireland from 1606 to 1619. His younger brother Isaac was later High Sheriff of Antrim.

In later life, he married Anne Douglas; they had a number of children who predeceased them.

== Career ==
Macartney was intended to follow his father into the family business but volunteered for the army during the Nine Years War, and served with much credit under the Duke of Marlborough and Prince Eugene. After the War of the Spanish Succession began, he was appointed Colonel of a new regiment, McCartney's Regiment of Foot, which initially served under Marlborough in Flanders before being sent to Spain in 1706. He was wounded and captured at the Battle of Almanza, where the regiment suffered heavy casualties; he was quickly exchanged and returned to the Low Countries in 1709, where he served as a volunteer at Malplaquet and subsequently made Major-general. His regiment fought at the sieges of Douai and Béthune in 1710, after which he became Lieutenant-General.

Along with Marlborough and many other Whigs, Macartney was deprived of his positions following the Tory victory in the 1710 British general election. In 1712, he acted as second to the Whig Lord Mohun, in his duel with the Tory Duke of Hamilton, both of whom were killed. It was then common practice for seconds to join the fight and MacCartney and the Duke's second, the unrelated Colonel Hamilton were arrested. Hamilton accused McCartney of having stabbed the Duke while lying on the ground and he escaped to Hanover, where he remained until 1714, when he returned with George I.

Soon after this, he demanded to be tried for the offence which had been laid to his charge, and on the evidence of the keepers of Hyde Park, who had witnessed the duel throughout all its phases, was honourably acquitted. His former regiment having been disbanded at the peace of Utrecht, he was appointed to the colonelcy of the Royal North British Fusiliers on 12 July 1716, from which he was removed on 9 March 1727 to the Carabiniers, and he retained this appointment until his death on 7 July 1730.

Military offices
Preceded by Regiment raised	Colonel of Macartney's Regiment of Foot; 1704–1709	Succeeded by Richard Sutton
Preceded by Sir Thomas Prendergast	Colonel of Macartney's Regiment of Foot; 1709–1710	Succeeded by Richard Kane
Preceded by The Earl of Orrery	Colonel of the Royal North British Fuzileers; 1716–1727	Succeeded by Sir James Wood
Preceded by The Viscount Shannon	Colonel of the King's Regiment of Carabineers; 1727–1730	Succeeded by The Earl of Deloraine
