= William Taylor Birchenough =

British pilot

William Taylor Birchenough (1891–1962) was a pioneering British aviator and test pilot.

== Family ==
Birchenough was born at Gawsworth New Hall, the third son of William Taylor Birchenough, a silk Manufacturer and Justice of Peace, for the County of Chester, and his wife Jane Birchenough, daughter of Richard Peacock MP. His grandfather was John Birchenough, a Mayor of Macclesfield and he was a nephew of Sir Henry Birchenough. One of his nephews was William Anthony Birchenough a member of the 1964 Balinka Pit expedition.

== Fowler's Match ==
At Eton College he was a proficient cricketer and played in the famous Fowler's Match in 1910 against Harrow School which was described in an article in The Spectator marking the match's centenary, as "what might just be the greatest cricket match of all time".

== Aviation career ==
After leaving Eton Birchenough developed an interest in flying and joined the Grahame-White training school on 7 February 1913. Over the following months he carried out his training under the instruction of Marcus Dyce Manton before being awarded his aviator's certificate on 13 June 1913 in a Grahame White Biplane. Subsequently, he worked for the Grahame-White Company.

Birchenough started to regularly compete in flying races at Hendon, from August 1913 onwards often flying a G-W 50 Gnome aircraft or Box-Kites.

In January 1914 Birchenough took part in the "Upside Down Dinner" held at the Royal Automobile Club . Attended by many aviation pioneers, the dinner was held in recognition of those who were first to loop the loop in an aeroplane.

In 1914 he competed in a series of air races and won the Shell Motor Spirit Trophy for a special speed contest.

On 6 June he flew a Maurice Farman aeroplane at the last Aerial Derby before the outbreak of war and two weeks later he competed in the London to Manchester handicap

On 3 August 1914 Birchenough flew a Maurice Farman aeroplane from Hendon to Leighton Buzzard to carry out a demonstration at a Flower Show but was forced to return after learning that the Government had imposed a ban on flights that day of more than three miles from an aerodrome due to fears of impending war. The following day war was declared on Germany.

== World War One ==
After the outbreak of World War One he joined the Aircraft Manufacturing Company (Airco) as a test pilot responsible for delivering planes to the Aeronautical Inspection Department (AID) at Farnborough and putting them though their tests.

In August 1916 "The Aeroplane" reported that Birchenough was one of the steadiest and most skilful pilots in the country and that "since the outbreak of war he had passed a legion of machines through their tests"

In 1917 he was elected a member of the Aeronautical Society of Great Britain. Birchenough married Eileen Moncrieffe Mesham of Pontruffydd Hall in 1915. He died on 15 December 1962 in Wimborne, Dorset, England.
