= Godwin Birchenough =

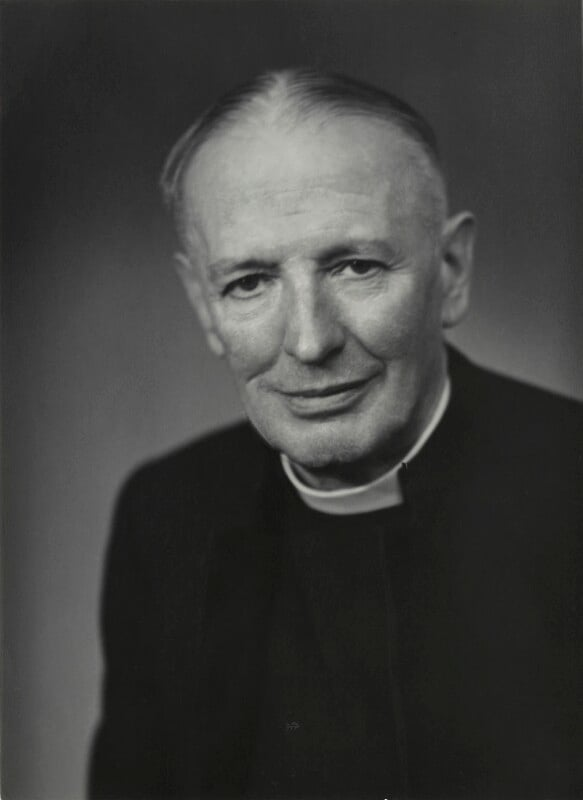
Birchenough in 1950

Godwin Birchenough (27 October 1880 – 3 March 1953) was an Anglican cleric and Dean of Ripon.

Birchenough was born in Macclesfield, Cheshire, the only son of Walter Edwin Birchenough and the grandson of John Birchenough, a prominent Macclesfield silk manufacturer. Godwin Birchenough, who was also a nephew of Sir Henry Birchenough, the President of the British South Africa Company, was educated at Rugby and Oriel College, Oxford. Birchenough was ordained in 1905 and was Vicar of Moor Allerton between 1913 and 1921. He became an honorary Canon of Chelmsford Cathedral in 1933 and in 1941 became Dean of Ripon Cathedral, becoming Dean Emeritus in 1951. An eminent author, he was also vice chairman of the Additional Curates Society between 1934 and 1944. Godwin Birchenough married Edith, daughter of Ernest Keay in 1912, he died on 3 March 1953.

Church of England titles
Preceded by Charles Mansfield Owen	Dean of Ripon; 1941 – 1951	Succeeded by Frederick Llewelyn Hughes
