= William Anthony Birchenough =

British cave explorer

William Anthony "Bill" Birchenough(16 December 1925 – 15 October 2012) was a British cave explorer and a member of the 1964 Balinka pit expedition to Yugoslavia. He was the only person on the first expedition to reach the -650 feet level and in December 1966 was awarded the Yugoslav Order of the Flag with Gold Star by the Yugoslav Government together with three other members of the Balinka expeditions.

== Background ==
Birchenough was born in Sevenoaks and attended Eton College and Dauntsey's School before serving in the RAF in India. He was a nephew of the aviation pioneer William Taylor Birchenough. After his return from India he took part in the Berlin Airlift, working for Flight Refuelling Limited, before joining the Royal Aircraft Establishment in Farnborough, then latterly Aberporth in West Wales. It was in Wales that he developed his interest in speleology and joined the South Wales Caving Club. (SWCC)

== Speleology ==
In 1958 he joined the South Wales Caving Club. On Saturday April 12 of that year he had visited the Waterfall series in Dan yr Ogof for the first time as a prospective member of the club, when his guide, David Jenkins had fallen near Idol Junction and was rendered unconscious. Bill successfully made his own way out and reported the accident and a relief party successfully rescued David Jenkins. He was an active member of the club in the nineteen sixties, taking part in the third phase of the explorations of Dan yr Ogof in early 1966 with other members of the SWCC. He developed an interest in using radio transmissions for cave surveys and developed the SWCC's first radio device, known as an Ogofone, for locating caves which was first used in Cwm Dwr in 1960. He also developed experience in the use of explosives for cave exploration and was instrumental in the locating the top entrance of Ogof Ffynnon Ddu.

== The 1964 Balinka Pit expedition ==
In August 1964 The South Wales Caving Club at the invitation of the Speleological Society for Croatia organised a joint expedition to the Balinka Pit in the Lika region of Croatia. The Expedition was led by Zlatko Pepionik and Clive Jones and involved 22 Yugoslav and British personnel. The objectives of the 1964 expedition included:

1. The exploration and collation of scientific information about the Balinka pit which was known to be very deep

2. To add to existing knowledge of caving equipment and techniques

3. To publish a report to enable lessons to be learned from the expedition

4. To provide younger members of the South Wales Caving Club with experience to build upon for the future.

The Yugoslavs also explained that Balinka had been the location of the execution of four Partisans on April 2, 1942, Robert Domany, Drago Štajnberger, Branko Latas, and Stevo Čuturilo. Two of these, (Domany and Štajnberger) had both been designated People's Hero of Yugoslavia.

The first descent was by Gwyn Thomas, a deflection boom was lowered, and other members of the team assembled on a ledge 60 feet down for the next phase of the descent. These descents were in a small cage and whilst initially two members of the team were transported at one time, later it was decided after an ascent by Clive Jones and Peter Noel Dilly, to only transport one person at a time because of concerns about the pressure on the winch. The partially preassembled boom was eventually constructed on a ledge 200 feet down where a landing stage was established and another member of the team John Osborne descended 560 feet before encountering an overhang which risked preventing his return.

Bill Birchenough made the last and deepest descent of the expedition, reaching a ledge nearly 700 feet down. A tape recording and transcription were made of the conversation with him during his descent which involved some improvisation and the drilling of a bolt into the ledge which was used for a second expedition a year later. The first expedition was concluded after his descent and successful return.

== The Second Balinka Pit Expedition (1966) ==
Bill Birchenough did not take part in the second Balinka expedition which took place in 1966 and reached the bottom of the pit, gathering scientific information and recovering the remains of the four partisans executed in the Second World War.

== Yugoslav Government Awards ==
In December 1966, Clive Jones, Bill Birchenough, Rod Stewart, Bernard Woods and the SWCC were awarded the Yugoslav Order of the Flag with Gold Star for their roles in the expeditions by Ivo Sarajčić, the Yugoslav Ambassador in London.
