= Macclesfield Town Council =

Local authority for Macclesfield, Cheshire, England

- Logo

Type
- Type: Town Council

History
- Founded: 2015
- Preceded by: Macclesfield Charter Trustees, Macclesfield Borough Council, Macclesfield Municipal Borough.

Leadership
- Town Mayor: Cllr James Barber-Chadwick (Labour)
- Deputy Mayor: Cllr Sarah Bennett-Wake (Labour)
- Town Clerk: Laura Smith
- Civic Officer: Nicola Mellor

Structure
- Seats: 12 councillors
- Labour Party (UK): 8 / 12
- Independents: 3 / 12

Elections
- Last election: 4 May 2023
- Next election: Date TBC

Website
- www.macclesfield-tc.gov.uk

Macclesfield Town Council is the town council for Macclesfield which was established in 2015. Created following a Local Governance Review carried out by Cheshire East Council, the new council adopted town council status on 5 May 2015, allowing it to appoint its chairman as Mayor of Macclesfield.

== Town Mayor ==
Macclesfield Town council has a Town Mayor and Deputy Mayor. A councillor can only hold the position of mayor for one year.

Year	Mayor	Deputy Mayor	Town Clerk
2015	Cllr Liz Durham	Cllr Alift Harewood-Jones MBE	Pete Turner
2016	Cllr Alift Harewood-Jones MBE	Cllr Beverley Dooley	Pete Turner
2017	Cllr Beverley Dooley	Cllr Adam Schofield	Pete Turner
2018	Cllr Adam Schofield	Cllr Chris Andrew	Pete Turner
2019	Cllr Janet Jackson MBE	Cllr Sarah Bennett-Wake	Pete Turner
2020	Cllr Sarah Bennett-Wake	Cllr David Edwardes	Pete Turner
2021	Cllr David Edwardes	Cllr Fiona Wilson	Laura Smith
2022	Cllr Fiona Wilson	Cllr Chris Wilcock	Laura Smith
2023	Cllr Chris Wilcock	Cllr Sandy Livingstone	Laura Smith
2024	Cllr Sandy Livingstone	Cllr Emma Gilman	Laura Smith
2025	Cllr Emma Gilman	Cllr James Barber-Chadwick	Laura Smith
2026	Cllr James Barber-Chadwick	Cllr Sarah Bennett-Wake	Laura Smith

== Councillors ==
The current list of councillors in Macclesfield Town Council, following the Local Elections on 4 May 2023.

Name	Ward	Party
Cllr Dr Ruth Thompson	Broken Cross and Upton	Labour
Cllr Christopher Wilcock	Broken Cross and Upton	Labour
VACANT	Central	Labour
Cllr James Barber-Chadwick	Central	Labour
Cllr Mick Warren	East	Independent
Cllr Sarah Bennett-Wake	Hurdsfield	Labour
Cllr Sam Hale	South	Labour
Cllr Fiona Wilson	South	Labour
Cllr David Edwardes	Tytherington	Independent
Cllr Emma Gilman	Tytherington	Independent
Cllr Alift Harewood MBE	West and Ivy	Labour
Cllr Mike Hutchison	West and Ivy	Labour

== Elections ==
=== 4 May 2023 ===
The council had its third election on 4 May 2023, the same day as the elections to Cheshire East Council. At the time of the elections there were two vacant seats on the Town Council. All 10 of the incumbent Councillors were re-elected, and Cllr Emma Gilman, Independent for Tytherington and Cllr James Barber-Chadwick, Labour candidate for Central Ward were elected to the empty seats.

Cllr Chris Wilcock was then unanimously elected as Mayor of Macclesfield on the 15th May 2023, with Cllr Sandy Livingstone unanimously elected as Deputy Mayor.

=== 2 May 2019 ===
The council had its second election on 2 May 2019, the same day as the 2019 United Kingdom local elections in England and Northern Ireland, which included elections to Cheshire East Council. The Conservatives lost control of Cheshire East Council for the first time, including losing all their Macclesfield councillors. These results were reflected in the Town Council too, where the Tories lost all eight of their seats. Labour fared better, gaining five seats to a total of nine, while Independents won the remaining three.

==== Broken Cross and Upton Ward ====
Fin Shenton and Chris Wilcock were elected. The turnout was 66.1%.

Macclesfield Town Council Elections 2019: Broken Cross and Upton
Party	Candidate	Votes	%	±%
Labour	Fin Shenton	978		N/A
Labour	Chris Wilcock	891		N/A
Conservative	Liz Durham	818		N/A
Conservative	Gareth Jones	684		N/A
Majority				N/A
Turnout				N/A

=== 7 May 2015 ===
The first election of Macclesfield Town Council was held on 7 May 2015. Broken Cross, Central, Tytherington, South and West & Ivy Wards elect two councillors. East and Hurdsfield Wards elect one.

==== Broken Cross and Upton Ward ====
Liz Durham and Martin Hardy were elected. The turnout was 66.1%.

Macclesfield Town Council Elections 2015: Broken Cross and Upton
Party	Candidate	Votes	%	±%
Conservative	Liz Durham	2,201	34.0	N/A
Conservative	Martin Hardy	1,940	30.0	N/A
UKIP	David Langley	853	13.4	N/A
Labour	David Toby	1,476	22.8	N/A
Majority		464	7.2	N/A
Turnout		6,470	66.6	N/A

==== Central Ward ====
Bev Dooley and Janet Jackson were elected. The turnout was 59.3%.

Macclesfield Town Council Elections 2015: Central Ward
Party	Candidate	Votes	%	±%
Conservative	Bev Dooley	1,217	19	N/A
UKIP	Adrian Howard	684	10.7	N/A
Labour	Janet Jackson	1,553	24.2	N/A
Green	John Knight	896	14.0	N/A
Conservative	Bill Livesly	942	14.7	N/A
Labour	Richard Watson	1,107	17.3	N/A
Majority		282	4.4	N/A
Turnout		6,399	59.33	N/A

==== East Ward ====
Philip Bolton was elected. The turnout was 68.6%.

Macclesfield Town Council Elections 2015: East Ward
Party	Candidate	Votes	%	±%
Conservative	Philip Bolton	815	35.4	N/A
Green	Lindy Brett	340	14.8	N/A
Liberal Democrats	Stephen Broadhead	466	20.3	N/A
Labour	Eileen Talbot	680	30.0	N/A
Majority		135	5.9	N/A
Turnout		2,301	68.6	N/A

==== Hurdsfield Ward ====
Matthew Sharrocks was elected. The turnout was 57.15%.

Candidate	Party	Vote Share
Brian Doherty	Green	20.4%
Bernadette McKenna	Conservative	35.3%
Matthew Sharrocks	Labour	44.3%

==== South Ward ====
Neil Puttick and Chris Andrew were elected. The turnout was 63.1%.

Candidate	Party	Vote Share
Liam Acton	Green	9.7%
Chris Andrew	Conservative	19.4%
Jane Leigh	UKIP	14.2%
Neil Puttick	Labour	20.3%
Bradley Snelling	Conservative	18.6%
Fiona Wilson	Labour	17.7%

==== Tytherington Ward ====
Arnold Ainsley and Gareth Jones were elected. The turnout was 70.0%.

Candidate	Party	Vote Share
Arnold Ainsley	Conservative	31.9%
John Houston	Green	11.2%
Gareth Jones	Conservative	24.1%
Lloyd Roberts	Independent	18.6%
Christopher Wilcock	Labour	14.3%

==== West and Ivy Ward ====
Alift Harewood-Jones MBE and Adam Schofield were elected. The turnout was 62.1%.

Candidate	Party	Vote Share
Martin Ault	UKIP	15.2%
Alift Harewood-Jones MBE	Labour	23.9%
Matthew Lewis	Labour	20.7%
Adam Schofield	Conservative	21.0%
Madge Slater	Conservative	19.2%

== Cadet to the Mayor of Macclesfield ==
In 2016 the incoming Mayor, Cllr Alift Harewood-Jones, established the position of Mayor's cadet, to have a young person from a local cadet organisation to assist in civic duties.

Year	Name	Organisation	
2016	Sgt Emily Storer	Air Cadets	201 (Macclesfield) Squadron
2017	Cpl Kieran Forshaw	Air Cadets	201 (Macclesfield) Squadron
2018	Cpl Julia Domanska	Air Cadets	201 (Macclesfield) Squadron
2019	Leading Cadet Jasmine Wrenn	Sea Cadets	Bollington & Macclesfield Sea Cadets
