= Leonard A. Montefiore =

Leonard Abraham Montefiore (1853, Kensington, London – 1879) was a writer and philanthropist. He was a grandnephew of Moses Montefiore and a nephew of Francis Goldsmid.

== Education ==
In October 1870 Montefiore entered University College London where he attended lectures for the next two years. It was at this time that he formed a friendship with Henry Birchenough that was described in his Essays and Letters as "the greatest friendship of his life". Montefiore attended Balliol College, Oxford where his posthumous memoire reports that he was a devotee of John Ruskin. While at Balliol he became a friend of Oscar Wilde who, after Montefiore's death allegedly proposed to his sister Charlotte. He was also influenced by Arnold Toynbee and Benjamin Jowett.

== Philanthropic work ==
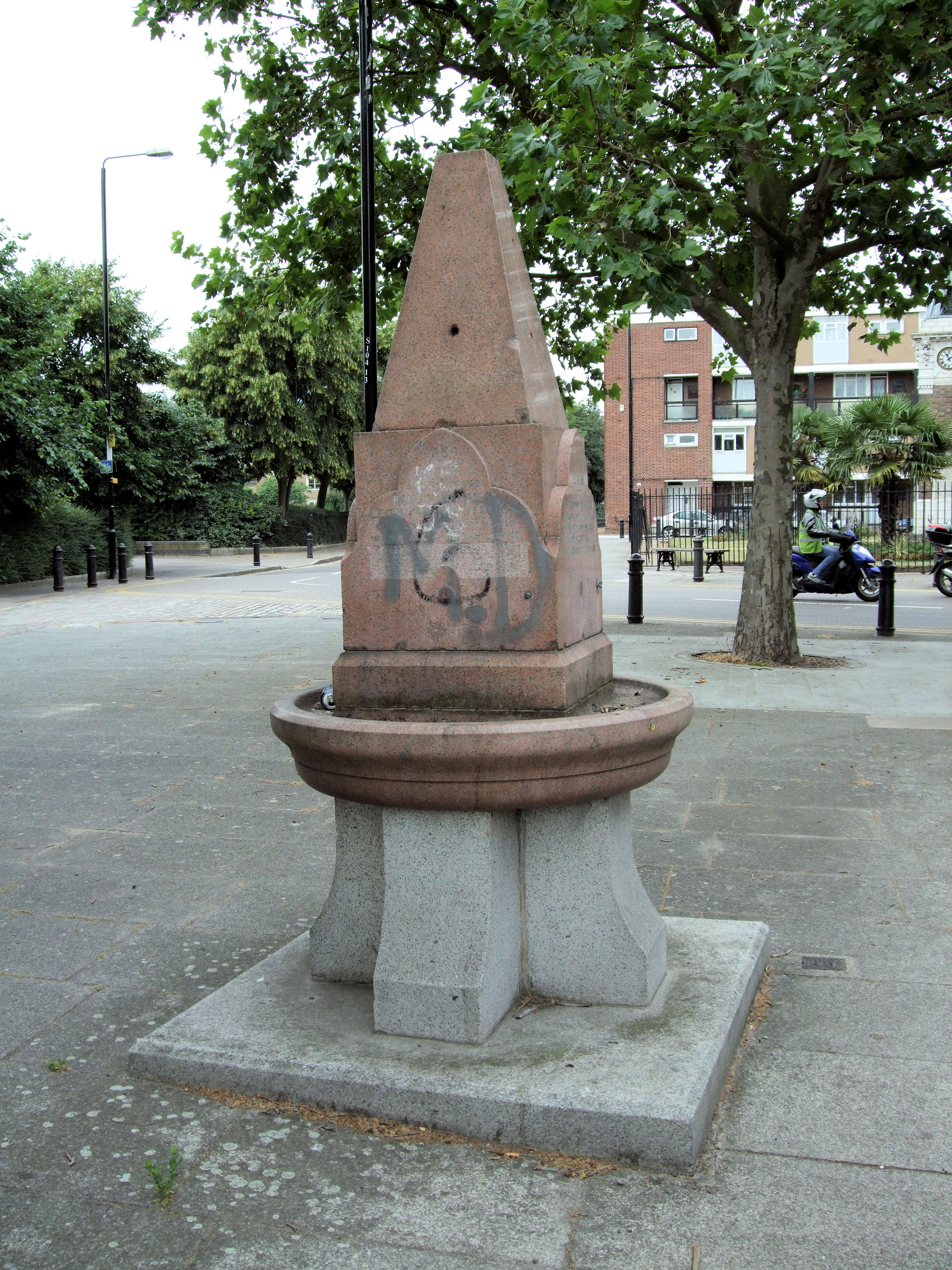
The Leonard Montefiore Drinking Fountain, Stepney Green

Montefiore was chief assistant to reformer Samuel Barnett in his work regarding the extension of Oxford University to London and was secretary of the Tower Hamlets branch of the Society for the Extension of University Teaching. Montefiore was the secretary of the Jewish Schools in Red Lion Square from April 1877 until his departure for America and became a member of the Jewish Board of Guardians in 1878.

The Jewish Encyclopedia says "Montefiore was associated with many philanthropic movements, especially with the movement for women's emancipation."

Montefiore died at Newport, Rhode Island, aged 26. According to the Women's rights activist Emily Faithfull in her book Three Visits to America (1884) Montefiore died "While he was visiting the United States, in order to see for himself what could be learned from the political and social condition of the people, must ever be deplored. The world can ill afford to lose men of such deep thought and energetic action."

== Essays and Letters ==
Montefiore's posthumously published Essays and Letters are divided into three sections with a foreword by Lord Milner who was a mutual friend of Henry Birchenough and Montefiore and had learnt to know the latter at Balliol College where both were influenced by Toynbee.

The first section of Essays and Letters deals with primarily German politics including Alsace Lorraine since 1871, the second section covers German literature, including Heine, Goethe, Heinrich von Treitschke, Heinrich Friedrich Karl vom und zum Stein and Joseph Görres. The third section is on social and miscellaneous issues, and includes articles on the Oneida community, working women, the position of women in the labour market and the Art Museum in Berlin.

== Memorial ==
A drinking fountain (1884) in memory of Montefiore exists in Stepney Green, East London. It is Grade II listed.

== Bibliography ==
Essays and Letters by Leonard A. Montefiore, in Memoriam, Privately Printed. London 1881.
