= Gawsworth =

Village in Cheshire, England

Coordinates: 53.216°N 2.166°W

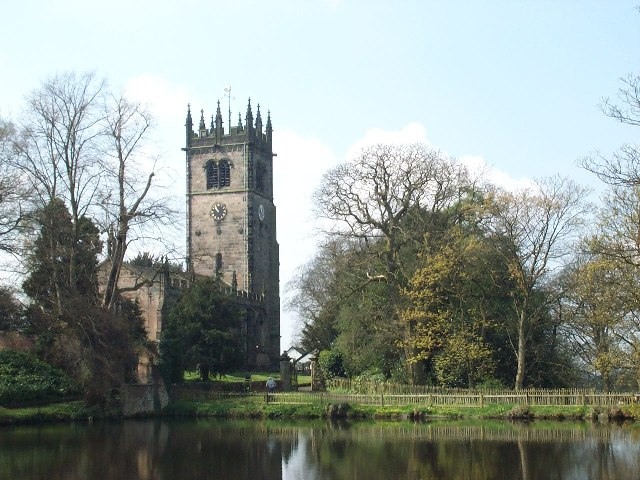
- St. James' Church, Gawsworth

- Location within Cheshire
- Population: 1,705 (2011)
- OS grid reference: SJ888688
- Civil parish: Gawsworth
- Unitary authority: Cheshire East
- Ceremonial county: Cheshire
- Region: North West
- Country: England
- Sovereign state: United Kingdom
- Post town: MACCLESFIELD
- Postcode district: SK11
- Dialling code: 01625
- Police: Cheshire
- Fire: Cheshire
- Ambulance: North West
- UK Parliament: Macclesfield

Gawsworth Village Logo

Gawsworth /ˈɡɔːzwəθ/ is a civil parish and village in the unitary authority of Cheshire East and the ceremonial county of Cheshire, England. The population of the civil parish at the 2011 census was 1,705. It is one of the eight ancient parishes of Macclesfield Hundred. Twenty acres of the civil parish were transferred to Macclesfield civil parish in 1936.

The country houses Gawsworth Old Hall, Gawsworth New Hall and Gawsworth Old Rectory are in the village. The authors of the Cheshire volume of the Buildings of England series state:

There is nothing in Cheshire to compare with the loveliness of Gawsworth: three great houses and a distinguished church set around a descending string of pools, all within an enigmatic large-scale formal landscape.

A wood near the village known as Maggotty Wood is the burial place of the eighteenth-century dramatist Samuel "Maggotty" Johnson. His ghost is reputed to haunt the wood.

== Governance ==
Gawsworth Parish Council consists of 9 elected Councillors in two wards, Gawsworth Village and Gawsworth Moss. It is within the Gawsworth Ward of Cheshire East Council. In the UK Parliament it is represented by Tim Roca MP for the Macclesfield constituency.

== See also ==
- Listed buildings in Gawsworth
- St James' Church, Gawsworth
- Warren, Cheshire
