= Charles Mohun, 4th Baron Mohun of Okehampton =

English Army officer and diplomat (1675–1712)

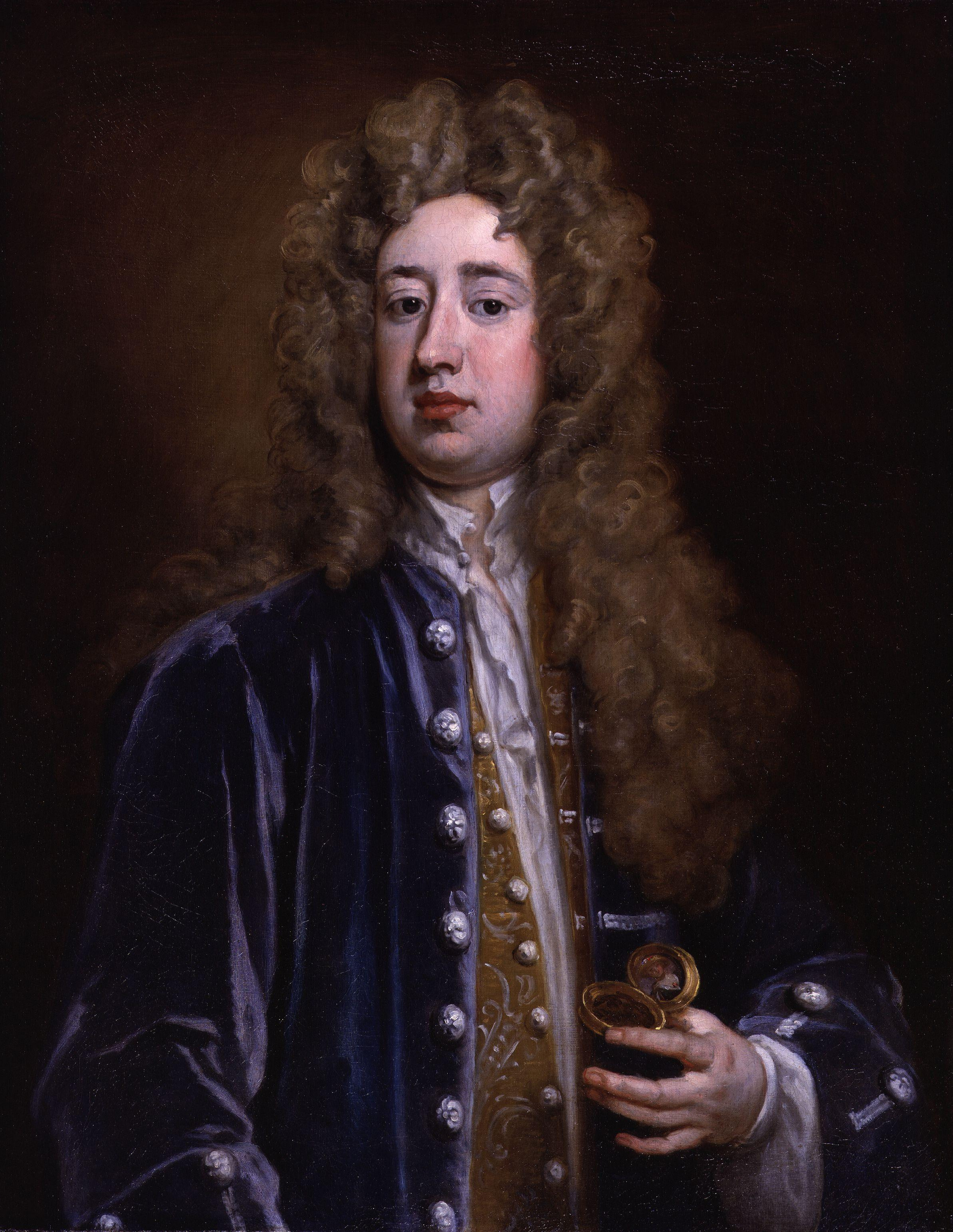
1707 portrait of Mohun by Sir Godfrey Kneller

Charles Mohun, 4th Baron Mohun (c. 1675 – 15 November 1712), was an English Army officer and diplomat best known for his frequent participation in duels. He was killed in the Hamilton–Mohun duel in Hyde Park, London.

== Life ==
Mohun was the second child of Charles Mohun, 3rd Baron Mohun, and his wife Philippa Annesley, a daughter of Arthur Annesley, 1st Earl of Anglesey. His father died shortly after his birth, following a duel, and left him the family estate. The estate, however, was heavily in debt. Due to this Mohun received no education, and was forced to resort to gambling in order to support his lavish lifestyle. Mohun married Charlotte Orby, granddaughter of Charles Gerard, 1st Earl of Macclesfield, in 1691 with the hope that this match would alleviate some of his debt. Unfortunately, he received no dowry for the marriage, and the couple separated shortly thereafter.

A gambling dispute in late 1692 resulted in his first duel, with John Kennedy, 7th Earl of Cassilis. But Mohun is best remembered for the events of 9 December of that year — a friend of Mohun, an officer named Richard Hill, had fallen in love with the actress Anne Bracegirdle; however, he thought himself, almost certainly erroneously, to face competition from actor William Mountfort. Mohun and Hill ambushed the actor after a performance and, whilst Mohun distracted him — or by some eyewitness accounts stood by watching — Hill stabbed him through the chest. Following Mountfort's death the next day, Hill fled the country. Captured, Mohun stood trial before the House of Lords. However, in a verdict that was widely condemned, Mohun was acquitted on 6 February 1693.

Mohun joined the English Army shortly after his acquittal. There he served under Charles Gerard, 2nd Earl of Macclesfield, the uncle of his former wife, and briefly served in France. In 1697 the Lords again tried Mohun for the murder of Richard Coote following a duel on Leicester Square. Mohun was again acquitted, although his friend Edward Rich, 6th Earl of Warwick was found guilty of manslaughter. After this incident, Mohun took his seat in the House of Lords. In 1701 he accompanied the Earl of Macclesfield on a diplomatic mission to Hanover. Following the death of Macclesfield later in the year, Mohun was left most of his estate. He spent over a decade defending his inheritance from rival claimants, most famously from James Douglas, 4th Duke of Hamilton.

In 1707, he became a member of the Kit-Cat Club, the pre-eminent Whig political and literary association of the period. Also in 1707, Mohun began building his new country house, Gawsworth New Hall. In 1712, two years after Mohun's Whig party had been heavily defeated in an election, the Duke of Hamilton gained the post of special envoy to Paris. Also at this time, Mohun's legal dispute with Hamilton over his inheritance of the Macclesfield estate was going badly. Shortly before Hamilton's scheduled departure for France, Mohun challenged him to a duel which was fought on 15 November in Hyde Park.

Many of Hamilton's supporters believed (on the report of Hamilton's second) that the Duke had been killed after slaying Mohun by Mohun's second, General George MacCartney. The only satisfactory evidence was that the principals had mortally wounded each other, both dying at the scene. Macartney fled and was charged, but acquitted by his peers on his return from France, and the conclusion was that Mohun had wounded Hamilton mortally before dying.

== Legacy ==
William Makepeace Thackeray fictionalised Mohun's duels in his novel The History of Henry Esmond.

Mohun and Hamilton suffered such horrific injuries that the government passed legislation banning the use of seconds in such duels. Also as a result swords were replaced as the weapons of choice in duels by the pistol, which tended to result in shorter and less bloody fights.

== Footnotes ==
Peerage of England
Preceded by Charles Mohun	Baron Mohun of Okehampton; 2nd creation 1677–1712	Extinct
