= Henry Birchenough =

English businessman and public servant (1853–1937)

Sir Henry Birchenough Bt GCMG
- Photographic portrait by Walter Stoneman, 1937, National Portrait Gallery, London
- Born: John Henry Birchenough; 7 March 1853; Macclesfield, Cheshire, England
- Died: 12 May 1937 (aged 84); London, London
- Occupations: Businessman, public servant
- Spouse: Mabel Charlotte Bradley

Sir John Henry Birchenough, 1st Baronet, GCMG (7 March 1853 – 12 May 1937) was an English businessman and public servant.

== Early life and education ==
Birchenough was born in Macclesfield, Cheshire, the second son of John Birchenough, a silk manufacturer. He was educated firstly at Strathmore House, Southport, then subsequently at the University of Oxford, University College, London (BA, 1873; MA, 1876). It was at University College London that he became close friends with Leonard Montefiore, the Jewish philanthropist. This friendship was described in the introduction to Montefiore's posthumous "Essays and Letters" as "the greatest friendship of his life- a friendship which was marred by no reserves and subject to no fluctuations but continued from its first commencement to Montefiore's death". Latterly Birchenough attended the École Libre des Sciences Politiques, Paris. According to an obituary published by Reuters at the time of his death it was whilst at Paris that he "obtained a much wider and less insular view of national and international problems, particularly in regard to tariffs, than he could have got at that period in England."

== Business ==
In the mid-19th century, Macclesfield had a thriving silk industry, and Birchenough joined the family silk business, John Birchenough & Sons, as a partner with his father and two brothers, Walter Edwin Birchenough (the father of the Very Reverend Godwin Birchenough) and William Taylor Birchenough. The latter was married to Jane Peacock, daughter of Richard Peacock MP, the locomotive manufacturer.

The Birchenoughs, who were Methodists, were a prominent business family in Macclesfield, and Henry's father, a Liberal, served as mayor of the town in 1876. In common with other silk manufacturing families in Macclesfield Henry Birchenough was engaged in supporting local charities and served variously as the chairman of the Technical School, the School of Art and the "Useful Knowledge Society" in Macclesfield.

Later in life whilst Chairman of the Beit Railway Trust, Birchenough supported Ruzawi School in Southern Rhodesia. The school named a large dormitory block the Birchenough Building in recognition of the work he had done on behalf of the school, particularly in the field of raising funds for the new buildings.

As well as being a partner in the family silk business Birchenough was also a director of the Imperial Continental Gas Association and of British Exploration of Australia Ltd, and later served as president of the Macclesfield Chamber of Commerce.

Birchenough became a close friend of Alfred Milner, the future Lord Milner, and the two shared lodgings in London prior to Birchenough's marriage. Their friendship was to endure until Milner's death.

Birchenough was a member of the Reform Club, Brooks's, the Ranelagh, and the City of London Club and served as Upper Bailiff for the Worshipful Company of Weavers from 1934 to 1935. He was also a member of council for the Royal Statistical Society, and a councillor for the Royal Colonial Institute. Birchenough was also a Fellow of both the Royal Empire Society and the Royal Geographical Society.

== Suffragists and women in society ==
Whilst still at University College, London, Birchenough showed an interest in women's rights, proposing a motion in January 1872 at the age of 19 to the UCL Debating Society, interpreting the debating society's rules as admitting women. The motion was seconded by John Neville Keynes and carried by 30 to 20.

On 24 March 1877, at the age of 24, having completed his MA, Birchenough appeared alongside Lydia Becker, Alice Cliff Scatcherd (subsequently one of the co-founders of the Women's Franchise League) and other early suffragists to discuss women's access to the vote in Macclesfield. The chairman, J. W. White, addressed the meeting saying that "it appeared somewhat strange that whereas the British Parliament had been engaged from time to time for many years back in conferring rights and removing disabilities, there should still exist any large and intelligent section of society outside the electoral community. They had not yet found any good reason given for excluding from parliamentary suffrage women who had already voted in municipal and school board elections; therefore they intended to reiterate their demands until they were conceded". Birchenough and Scatcherd seconded the first resolution, which was moved by Joshua Oldfield Nicholson. In the same year he is recorded as having given two pounds and two shillings to the Manchester National Society for Women's Suffrage.

Birchenough's immediate family retained links to early women's rights activists and Emily Faithfull served as witness to the marriage of Birchenough's brother William Taylor Birchenough. In her book Three Visits to America, Faithfull writes the following about the Birchenough silk mills:

"No one could desire to see women looking more healthy than the operatives in some of our factories in Manchester, Bradford, and Halifax. I shall long remember going through Messrs. Birchenough's silk mills at Macclesfield. Certainly the occasion was an exceptional one. The eldest son had been married the day before, and the entire place had been decorated by the operatives to commemorate the event. The walls were adorned by appropriate mottoes, even unique representations of the bridal ceremony had been devised, and everything betokened the happy understanding existing there between labor and capital. "

In 1905, Birchenough became a member of the industrial committee of the Victoria League, an Edwardian imperialist women's organisation. Founders of the Victoria League included Violet Markham, Edith Lyttelton, and Violet Cecil. After the death of her husband, Lord Edward Cecil, in 1918, the latter subsequently married Birchenough's friend Lord Alfred Milner in 1921.

== Southern and East Africa ==
After the South African War, and at the suggestion of Lord Milner, the British Government sent Birchenough to South Africa as Special Trade Commissioner in 1903 to enquire into prospects for British trade in the country in the aftermath of the war. According to a November 1903 New York Times article, Birchenough was optimistic about the revival of business opportunities for Britain in the country. In South Africa, he also undertook a study of the activities of Britain's main trade rivals, identifying the United States and Germany as being the main competitors in the country. Birchenough also laid out a number of suggestions to be considered to increase the United Kingdom's competitive edge; these and the rest of his report were incorporated into a Blue Book. For this work, he was appointed Companion of the Order of St Michael and St George (CMG) in the 1905 Birthday Honours.

He became a director of the British South Africa Company in 1905 and soon became prominent in the company, being appointed Knight Commander of the Order of St Michael and St George (KCMG) in the 1916 Birthday Honours for services to Rhodesia. He became president of the BSAC in 1925 and held the post until his death. He was appointed chairman of the Rhodesia Railway Company and the Mashonaland Railway Company in 1925 after the death of James Rochfort Maguire and retained the position until his own death. He was a Director of the Victoria Falls Power Company and the African Concessions Syndicate. He was also a director of the Rhodesian Anglo American Corporation Ltd under the chairmanship of Ernest Oppenheimer.

Surviving correspondence by Birchenough concerning BSAC affairs with Philip Lyttelton Gell and Alfred Lord Milner is to be found in the papers of the Gell family of Hopton Hall, in the Derbyshire Record Office and in the Alfred Milner, Viscount Milner papers at the Bodleian Library.

In 1924 he was appointed a seat on the East Africa Commission, otherwise known as the Southborough Committee chaired by Francis Hopwood, 1st Baron Southborough. The committee had several tasks including investigating measures to accelerate economic development and coordinate policy and improve health and economic development for the population across several countries in the region. The remit covered Kenya, Uganda, Northern Rhodesia, Nyasaland and Tanganyika.

Birchenough was also chairman of the Beit Railway Trust from 1931 until 1937. In 1932 he presented a grant of £50,000 from the Beit Trust to the fledgling Department of Civil Aviation in Colonial era Zimbabwe. In presenting the grant he stated that the trustees has agreed to set aside this sum for two years commencing in 1933 to improve ground services along the Imperial Airways route in the country. In the same year Imperial Airways (Africa) Ltd had just inaugurated a mail and passenger service to England. By 1935 the Rhodesia and Nyasaland Airways (RANA) was providing a regular mail and passenger service to Mozambique, Nyasaland and Northern Rhodesia. The Beit Railway Trust, Rhodesia Railway Company and Imperial Airways all had interests in RANA which was itself subsequently incorporated into Central African Airways in 1946.

After his death, Henry Birchenough's ashes were interred in a pillar of the Birchenough Bridge, which had been constructed with the support of the Beit Trust and which spans the Save River in Zimbabwe.

He was appointed Knight Grand Cross of the Order of St Michael and St George (GCMG) in the 1935 Birthday Honours for services to the British South Africa Company and the Beit Trust.

== Contributions to contemporary imperial discourse ==
Already in the late 1870s Birchenough had shown an interest in social issues concerning women's rights and in 1886 he addressed Macclesfield's Townley Street Mutual Improvement Society with a lecture titled: "The Making of Greater Britain" in which he sought to explain the origins of Britain's empire and to remind the audience of the responsibilities that this entailed.

Birchenough became close friends with Alfred Milner though an introduction by Leonard Montefiore around 1881; this friendship was to endure until Milner's death. Milner was best man at Birchenough's marriage in 1886 and prior to this the two of them shared chambers in London.

Together with Milner, Birchenough was a member of the Coefficients dining club, founded at a dinner given by Sidney and Beatrice Webb in September 1902, and which was a forum for the meeting of British socialist reformers, Tories and imperialists of the Edwardian era. Divisions within the club over the issue of Tariff Reform following Joseph Chamberlain's resignation as Secretary of State for the Colonies and the increasing dominance of the pro-Unionist membership, which favoured Chamberlain and his tariff reform policies, contributed to the club's dissolution in 1909. Birchenough held Liberal Unionist views and published an article entitled "Mr Chamberlain as an Empire Builder", in the periodical Nineteenth Century and After in 1902.

Birchenough also contributed to two compilations of essays and lectures in the pre-First World War period regarding imperial thinking. These included The Empire and the Century: A Series of Essays on Imperial Problems and Possibilities, published in 1905 by John Murray.

In 1911, he contributed to "The British Dominions", a lecture tour at Birmingham University in the winter of 1910–1911. The lectures were subsequently edited by William Ashley, the economic historian, and published by Longmans Green and Co in 1911.

== Tariff Commission ==
In 1902 Birchenough wrote an article titled "Preferential Tariffs within The Empire – A Reply to Sir Robert Giffen", in the periodical, Nineteenth Century and After. Two years later after his return from South Africa he became a member of the committee set up under the auspices of the Tariff Reform League by Joseph Chamberlain that produced the Tariff Commission report on the steel industry and trade, and the textile industry and fabrics.

== Government committees ==
In 1906, he was appointed to the Royal Commission on Shipping Rings, and was also a member of the Advisory Committee to the Board of Trade.

He worked with the Board of Trade during the First World War, chairing the After the War Textiles Committee from 1916, the Royal Commission on Paper from 1917, and the Committee on Cotton Growing in the Empire from 1917, and sitting on the Central Committee of Materials Supply and the Committee on Commercial and Industrial Policy under Lord Balfour of Burleigh from 1916.

From 1918 he chaired the Advisory Council to the Ministry of Reconstruction.

In 1919, under the chairmanship of Birchenough, the Advisory Council to the Ministry of Reconstruction produced the Report of the Committee of Chairmen on Electric Power Supply. The committee were asked to submit general comments or suggestions on the broad administrative and commercial issues arising out of the Williamson Report which had been produced by the Electric Power Supply Committee in 1917. The Birchenough Committee generally agreed with the Williamson Report but recommended that generation and transmission should be a single unified system with a state regulation and finance and that means should be found for including distribution as well.

This recommendation was very far-sighted but considered too ambitious for general acceptance at the time and was ignored. If acted upon it would have anticipated the Electricity Act 1947 by twenty-eight years.

The Electricity (Supply) Act 1919, was based essentially on the Williamson and Birchenough reports and introduced central co-ordination by establishing the Electricity Commissioners, an official body responsible for securing reorganisation on a regional basis.

Birchenough was also a government director of the British Dyestuffs Corporation.

For these war services, in the 1920 New Year Honours, he was created a baronet of Macclesfield in the County of Chester on 4 February 1920 .

== The Patriotic Association of Macclesfield and the National Service League ==
In 1900, Birchenough joined with Thomas Coglan Horsfall to instigate the Patriotic Association of Macclesfield, which was envisaged as a feeder for the local Volunteer Force. Subsequently, he became president of the Association whilst Horsfall became treasurer. In early 1902, the National Service League was formed in London. Birchenough sat on the executive committee of the League.

Progressing with the same theme, in July 1904 Birchenough published an article in the Nineteenth Century and After entitled "Compulsory Education and Compulsory Military Training", where he linked compulsory military training with the need for creating national efficiency.

== The First World War and the conscription debate ==
In 1915, Birchenough was a signatory with a number of other "distinguished men of all parties" including Admiral Lord Charles Beresford of a manifesto which appeared in the Morning Post calling for a "complete and organised effort to carry on the war requiring all men to either fight or be available for national service at home". The manifesto followed a series of letters which had appeared in the Morning Post and attracted support from diverse figures including Neville Chamberlain, Sir H. Rider Haggard, and Lord Northcliffe. Subsequently, the Morning Post included further signatories to the manifesto. The manifesto did undermine the legitimacy of the National Service League which decided not to actively participate in the manifesto campaign.

== Family ==
Henry Birchenough married Mabel Charlotte, third daughter of George Granville Bradley, Dean of Westminster in December 1886. Alfred Milner was best man. Mabel, like her sister Margaret, was a writer and the author of The Popular Guide to Westminster Abbey (1885), Disturbing Elements (1896), Potsherds (1898), and Private Bobs and the New Recruit (1901). One of Birchenough's nephews, William Taylor Birchenough (son of William Taylor Birchenough of Gawsworth Hall), played in the famous Eton v. Harrow Fowler's match in 1910 and was an early aviator, and another, the Very Reverend Godwin Birchenough, became Dean of Ripon. A third nephew, Richard Peacock Birchenough married Dorothy Grace Godsal, the daughter of Philip Thomas Godsal the inventor, marksman and historian.

Birchenough had two daughters, Sylvia and Elizabeth, but no sons, and the baronetcy became extinct on his death.

== Works ==
- "Do Foreign Annexations Injure British Trade?", article published in Nineteenth Century, 1897
- "England's Opportunity", article published in Nineteenth Century, July 1897
- "The Expansion of Germany", article published in Nineteenth Century, February 1898
- "The future of Egypt: The Niger and the Nile, a warning", article published in Nineteenth Century, 1898
- "The Imperial Function of Trade", article published in Nineteenth Century, 1899
- "Local Beginnings of Imperial Defence: an Example", article published in Nineteenth Century, 1900
- "A Civilian View", article published in Nineteenth Century, 1900
- "A Business View of South African Pacification", article published in Nineteenth Century and After, 1901
- "Mr Chamberlain as an Empire Builder", article published in Nineteenth Century and After, 1902
- "Preferential Tariffs within The Empire – A Reply to Sir Robert Giffen", article published in Nineteenth Century and After, 1902
- Commercial mission to South Africa: report received from Mr. Henry Birchenough, the special commissioner appointed by the Board of Trade to inquire into and report upon the present position and future prospects of British trade in South Africa, HMSO, 1903
- "Compulsory Education and Compulsory Military Training", article published in Nineteenth Century and After, July 1904
- "Some Effects of The War upon British and German Trade in South Africa", article published in the Journal of the African Society, 1915
- Report of the Departmental Committee appointed by the Board of Trade to consider the position of the textile trades after the war, 1918 (Birchenough chaired the committee)
- Report of the Empire cotton growing committee, HMSO, 1920 (Birchenough chaired the committee)

=== Sources ===
- Obituary, The Times, 13 May 1937
- Correspondence with Lord Alfred Milner; Milner Manuscripts, Bodleian Library
- Correspondence with Philip Lyttelton Gell, Derbyshire Record Office, Papers of the Gell Family of Hopton

Baronetage of the United Kingdom
New creation	Baronet (of Macclesfield); 1920–1937	Extinct
