= Hamilton–Mohun duel =

1712 duel in London

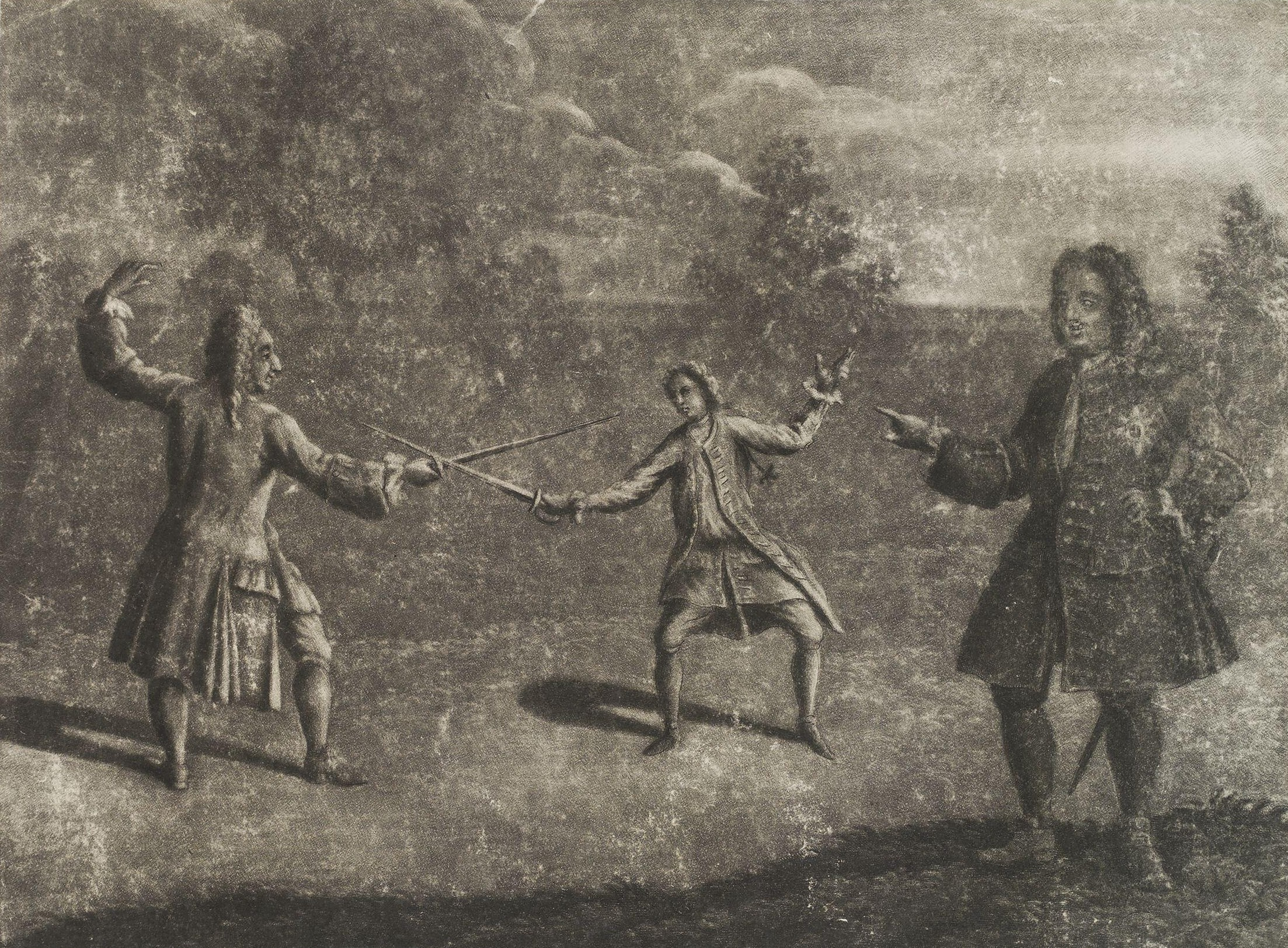
18th-century engraving of the duel

The Hamilton–Mohun duel occurred on 15 November 1712 in Hyde Park, which at that time was on the outskirts of London. The principal participants were James Hamilton, 4th Duke of Hamilton, and Charles Mohun, 4th Baron Mohun. Both men died from wounds received.

== Background ==
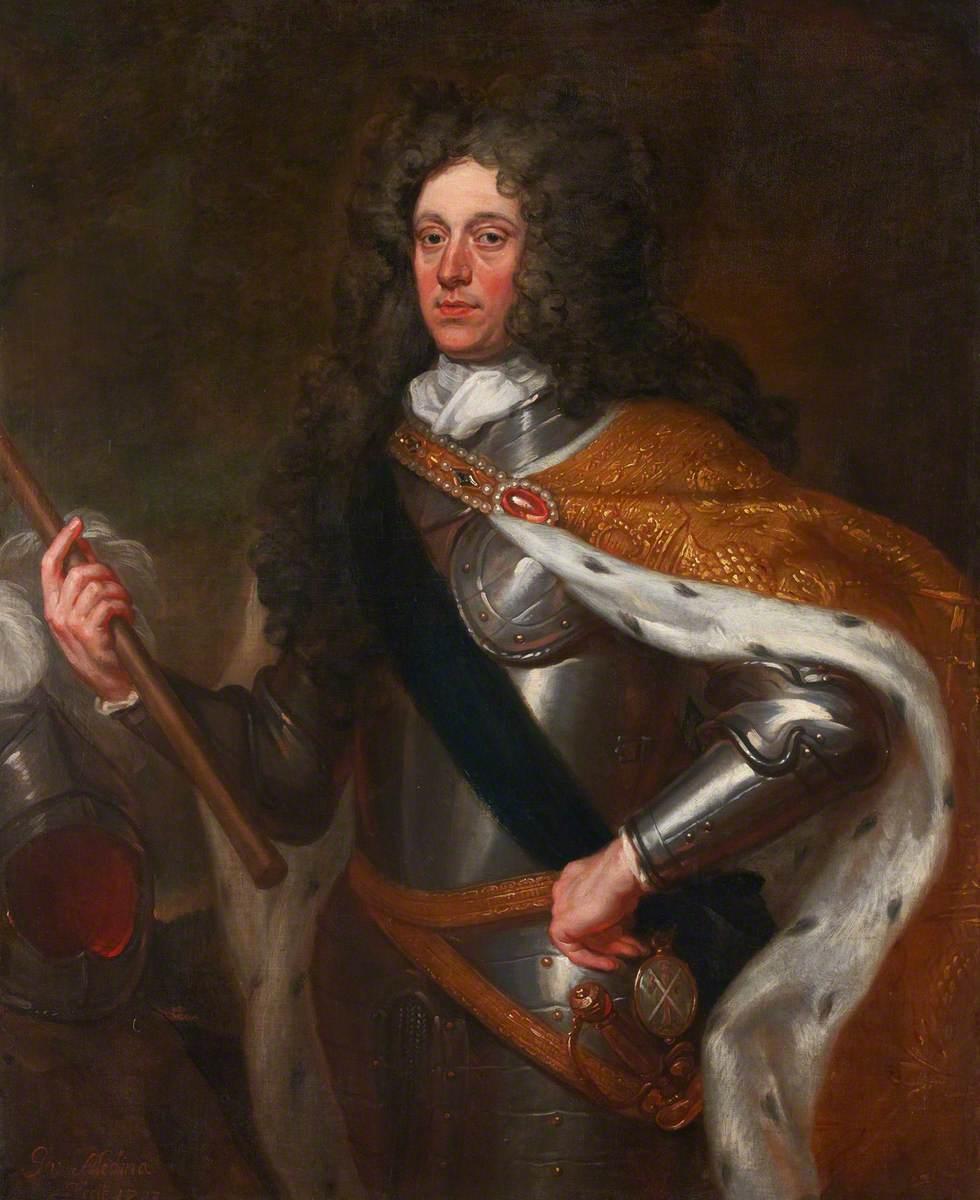
The Duke of Hamilton, a leading Scottish Tory politician, had recently been appointed as Ambassador to France.

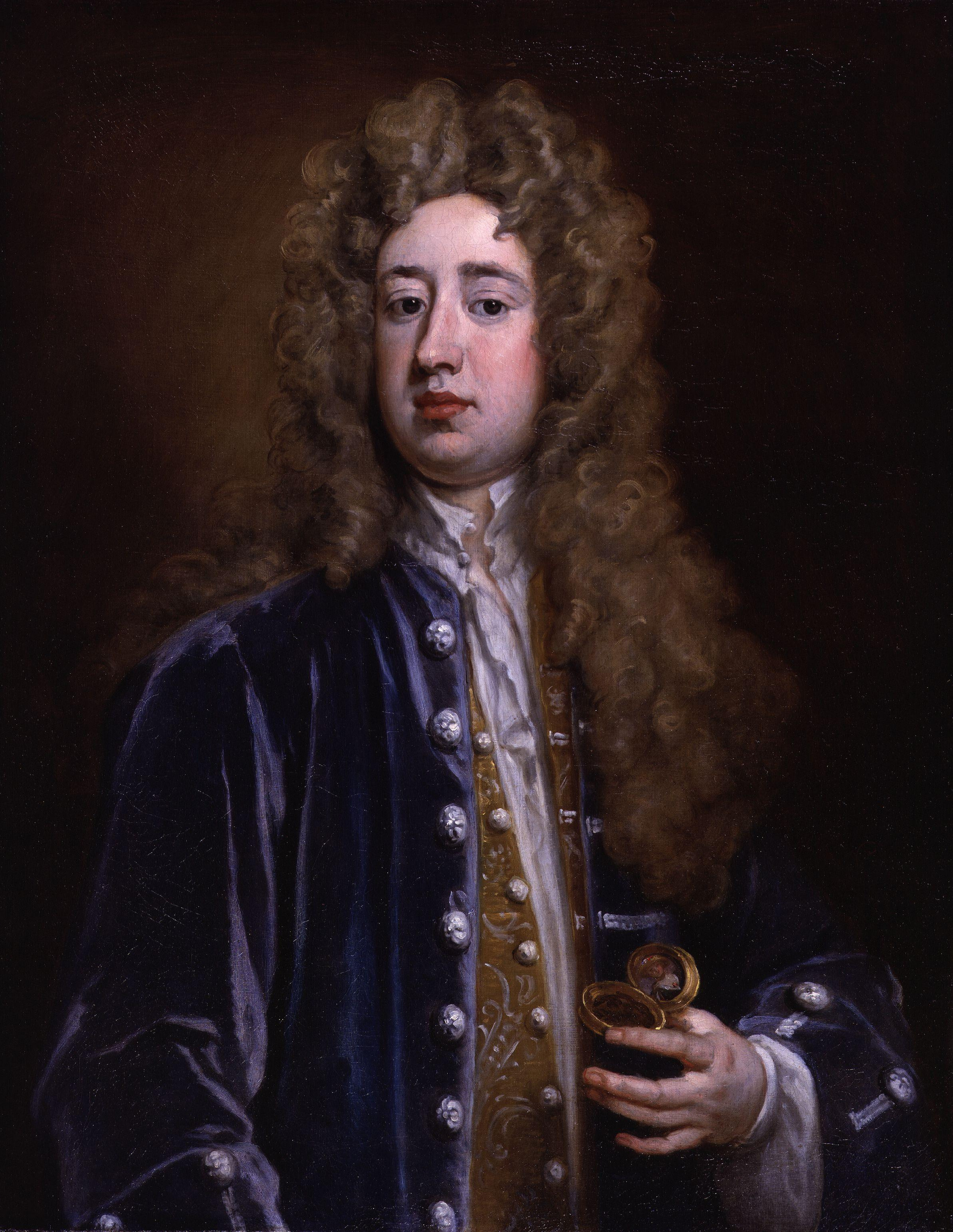
Lord Mohun, painted by Sir Godfrey Kneller in 1707, was a committed Whig.

Although ostensibly fought over a disputed inheritance, the duel had strong political overtones. Mohun was a prominent Whig while Hamilton had close links to the Tory government of Robert Harley. Hamilton had recently been appointed British Ambassador to Paris, where he was expected to negotiate the peace agreement that would end the War of the Spanish Succession. Mohun's political patron, the Duke of Marlborough, had recently been dismissed from his command, and was strongly opposed to the peace plan. This may have motivated Mohun to issue his challenge.

Mohun had developed a reputation as a violent and frequent duellist, having been involved in several fatal encounters. His father, the 3rd Baron Mohun, had himself been killed in a duel.

== The duel ==
Hamilton accepted Mohun's challenge to fight with swords. Hamilton selected his relation Colonel John Hamilton as his second, while Mohun employed his friend and political ally, Irish officer George Macartney. As was often customary at the time, seconds actively engaged in the combat.

The group assembled in Hyde Park very early in the morning. Once the duel began, Hamilton and Mohun went at each other "like wild beasts, not fencing or parrying". Both men were wounded in these fierce exchanges. Mohun was run through the chest, a fatal wound, while Hamilton was cut on the arm. Exactly what happened next remained contentious. Colonel Hamilton claimed that, with the duel over, he went to the assistance of the Duke who had dropped his sword; but Macartney stepped forward and delivered a fatal blow to him. In any event, the Duke soon died of his wounds.

== Aftermath ==
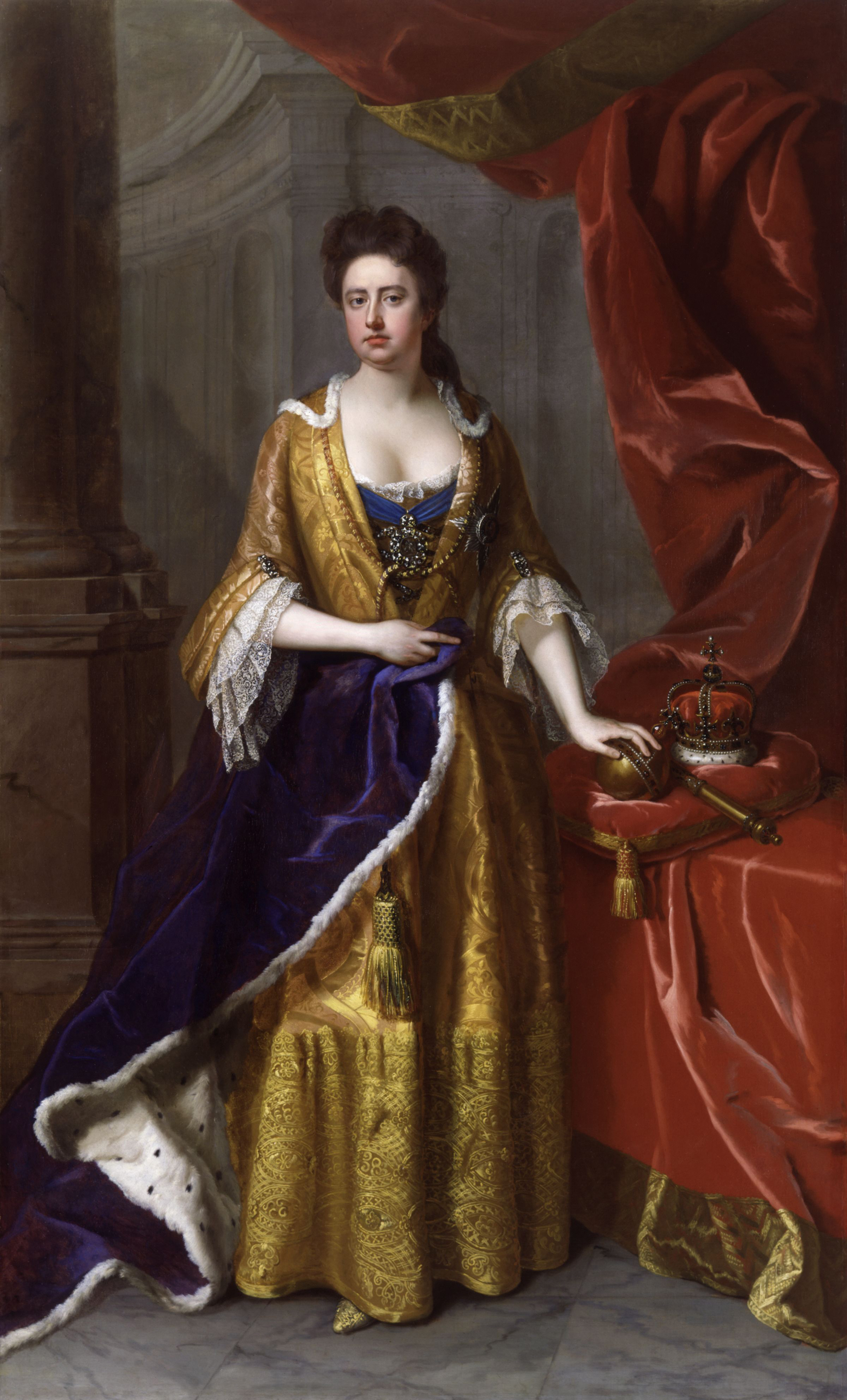
Queen Anne was critical of the practice of duelling in the aftermath of the Hyde Park fight.

The two seconds, Macartney and Colonel Hamilton, were both charged as accessories to murder. While Hamilton gave himself up, Macartney fled into exile in Hanover. He only returned to Britain once George I came to the throne. Based on Hamilton's testimony, Tories in Parliament portrayed the whole affair as a Whig plot designed to derail the prospective peace agreement with France.

After being put on trial in December 1712, Colonel Hamilton was found guilty of manslaughter. He received a much lesser punishment than he might potentially have been given because the jury accepted his claim that he had not known a duel was to take place when he had arrived at the park.

The apparent savagery of the duel led to a public outcry. This reinvigorated the campaign to clamp down on duelling, and, in April 1713, Queen Anne spoke out against the practice. While duelling continued to be a popular way of settling disputes during the eighteenth century, fresh conventions developed such as the use of pistols rather than swords. The traditional involvement of seconds in the actual fighting rapidly declined.

== In popular culture ==
The duel forms the basis for a scene in William Makepeace Thackeray's 1852 novel The History of Henry Esmond. In Virginia Woolf's 1928 novel Orlando: A Biography, Orlando recalls witnessing the duel when she walks into Hyde Park.
