= St James' Church, Gawsworth =

Coordinates: 53.2241°N 2.1661°W

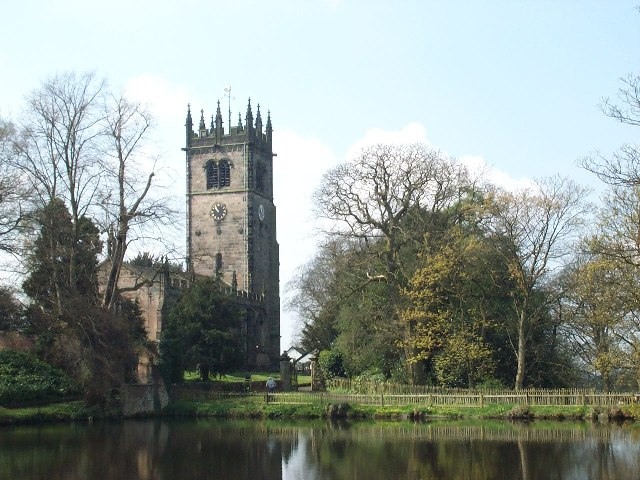
- St James' Church, Gawsworth

- Location in Cheshire
- OS grid reference: SJ 890 697
- Location: Gawsworth, Cheshire
- Country: England
- Denomination: Anglican
- Website: https://www.gawsworthchurch.co.uk

History
- Status: Parish church

Architecture
- Functional status: Active
- Heritage designation: Grade I
- Designated: 14 April 1967
- Architectural type: Church
- Style: Perpendicular

Specifications
- Materials: Limestone nave Sandstone tower and chancel Lead roof

Administration
- Province: York
- Diocese: Chester
- Archdeaconry: Macclesfield
- Deanery: Macclesfield
- Parish: Gawsworth

Clergy
- Rector: Rt. Rev W. A. Pwaisho

St James' Church is in the village of Gawsworth, Cheshire, England, and is sited near Gawsworth Hall. It is recorded in the National Heritage List for England as a designated Grade I listed building. It is an active Anglican parish church in the diocese of Chester, the archdeaconry of Macclesfield and the deanery of Macclesfield. Clifton-Taylor includes it in his list of 'best' English parish churches. The authors of the Buildings of England series describe the church as being "pretty, but odd".

== History ==
There is a record of a chapel on the site in the 13th century but the present building dates from the 15th century.

== Architecture ==
=== Exterior ===
The church is constructed in yellow and red ashlar sandstone with stone roofs. The nave is the oldest part, dating from about 1430, the tower and chancel being built some 40 years later. The church is entirely Perpendicular in style. The plan of the church consists of a tower at the west end, a wide three-bay nave without aisles, a south porch and a chancel divided from the nave by a screen. The tower has angular buttresses with niches which used to contain statues. It also has gargoyles, eight pinnacles, the coats of arms of Cheshire families, and Tudor badges. The porch also has niches over the doorway. The nave and chancel are embattled with pinnacles.

=== Interior ===
The rafter beam ceiling of the nave dates from the 15th century and the camber beam chancel ceiling, which is panelled, dates from slightly later. The chancel screen is dated 1894. The octagonal 16th-century font sits on a 19th-century stem with a wooden cover. At the east end of the chancel is a sanctus cot and bell. In the 19th century most of the old stained glass was removed, although fragments remain in the chancel windows. The stained glass in the east window is by William Wailes.

In the chancel are four tombs of members of the Fitton (Fytton) family. The oldest is an altar tomb to Francis Fytton dated 1608. On the top of the tomb is his recumbent bearded effigy and beneath him is a skeleton. Opposite is the monument to Dame Alice Fitton who died around 1626. In front of her seated effigy are effigies of her two sons kneeling, and behind her are figures of her two daughters, also kneeling. Adjacent is the tomb of Sir Edward Fitton, 1st baronet, and his wife Anne, who died in 1619 and 1644 respectively. In front of the tomb are the keeling figures of their three sons and seven daughters. One of the daughters was Mary, a maid of honour to Queen Elizabeth I and a candidate for the "Dark Lady" of Shakespeare's sonnets. The fourth tomb is to the memory of Sir Edward Fitton, 2nd baronet, who died in 1643, and his first wife Jane.

The two-manual organ was built by Nicholson and Lord of Walsall in 1895, obscuring the southwest window. In 1917 it was enlarged by Hayter and Son of Letchworth, obscuring the west window. In 1961 the organ was rebuilt and divided by Cyril Wood of Ashton-under-Lyne to reveal the west window. There is a ring of eight bells. Six of these were cast at the Whitechapel Bell Foundry, one by Charles and George Mears in 1856, the other five by Mears and Stainbank in 1890. The other two bells were cast by John Taylor and Company in 1907. The parish registers date from 1557.

== External features ==
A pair of 18th-century gate piers at the entrance of the churchyard are listed Grade II. On their fronts are carvings of skull and crossbones. In the churchyard is a 15th- or 16th-century cross base in sandstone ashlar. It consists of a square cross base and an octagonal shaft on a stepped plinth. A 20th-century wooden circular cross has been set on the shaft. A section of the garden wall of Gawsworth Old Hall, also Grade II listed, separates the churchyard from the grounds of the Hall.

The churchyard contains three war graves, of two British soldiers of World War I and one of World War II.

Associated listed buildings
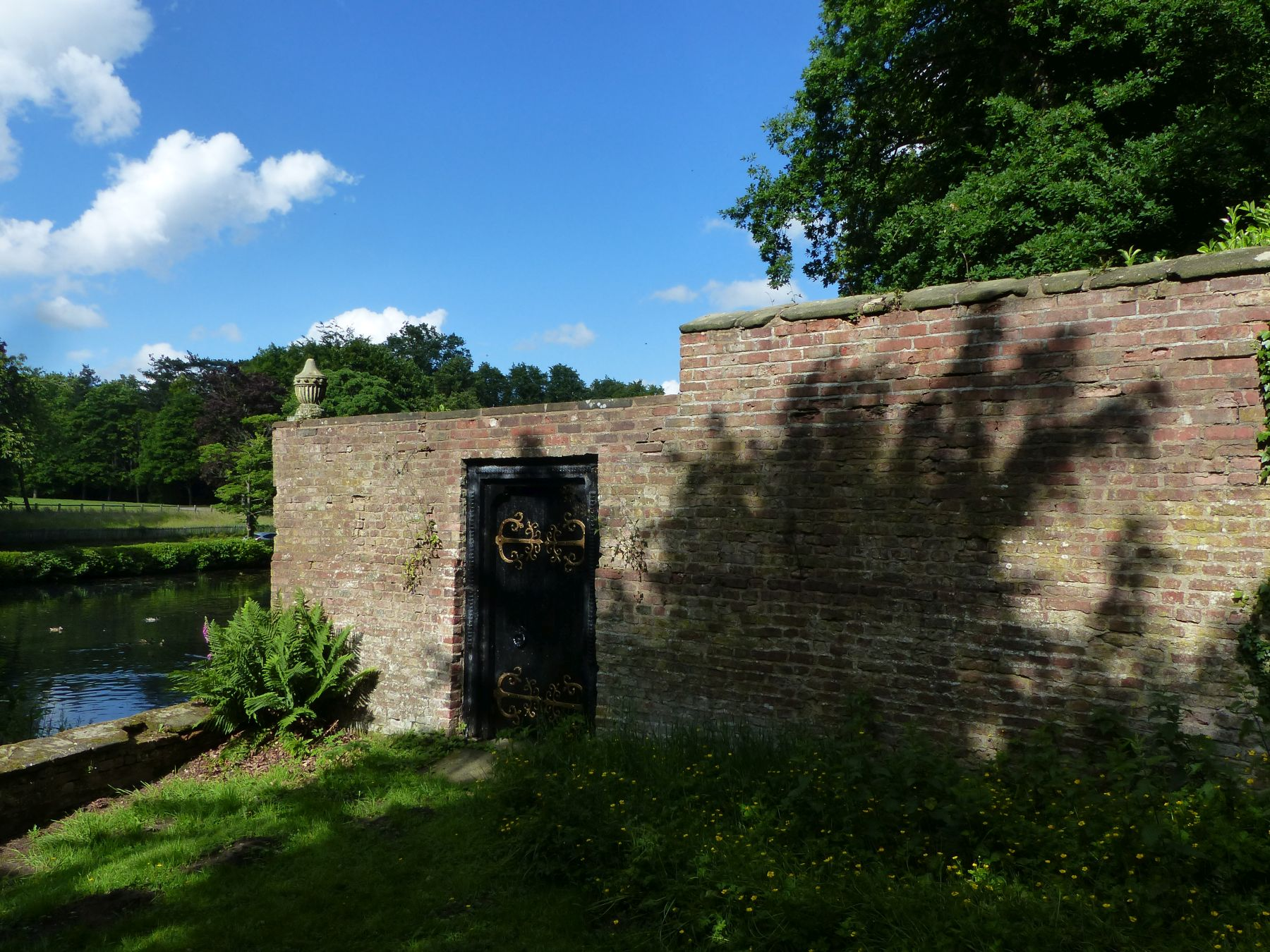
Garden walls at Gawsworth Old Hall

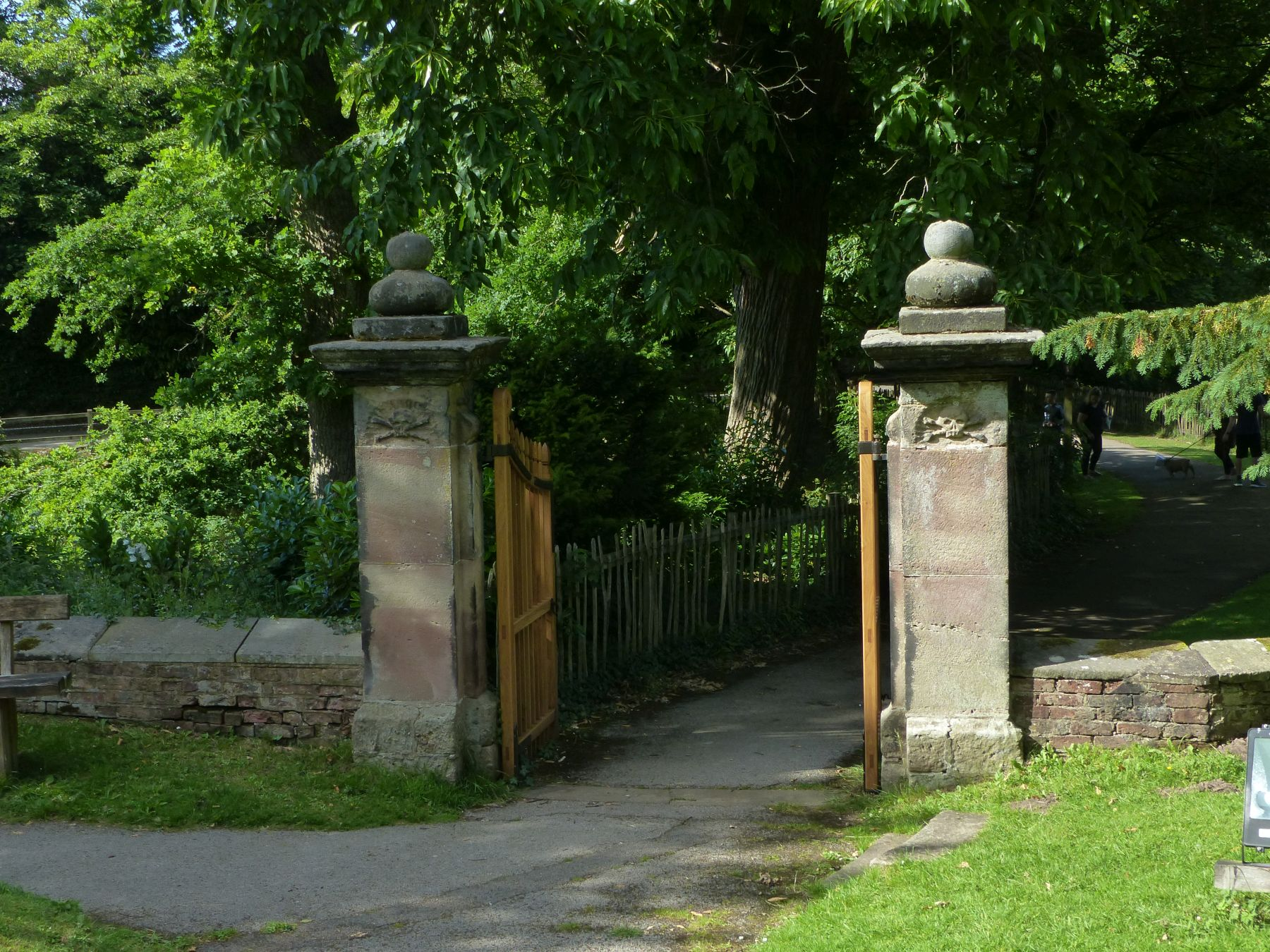
Pair of gatepiers in churchyard of St James

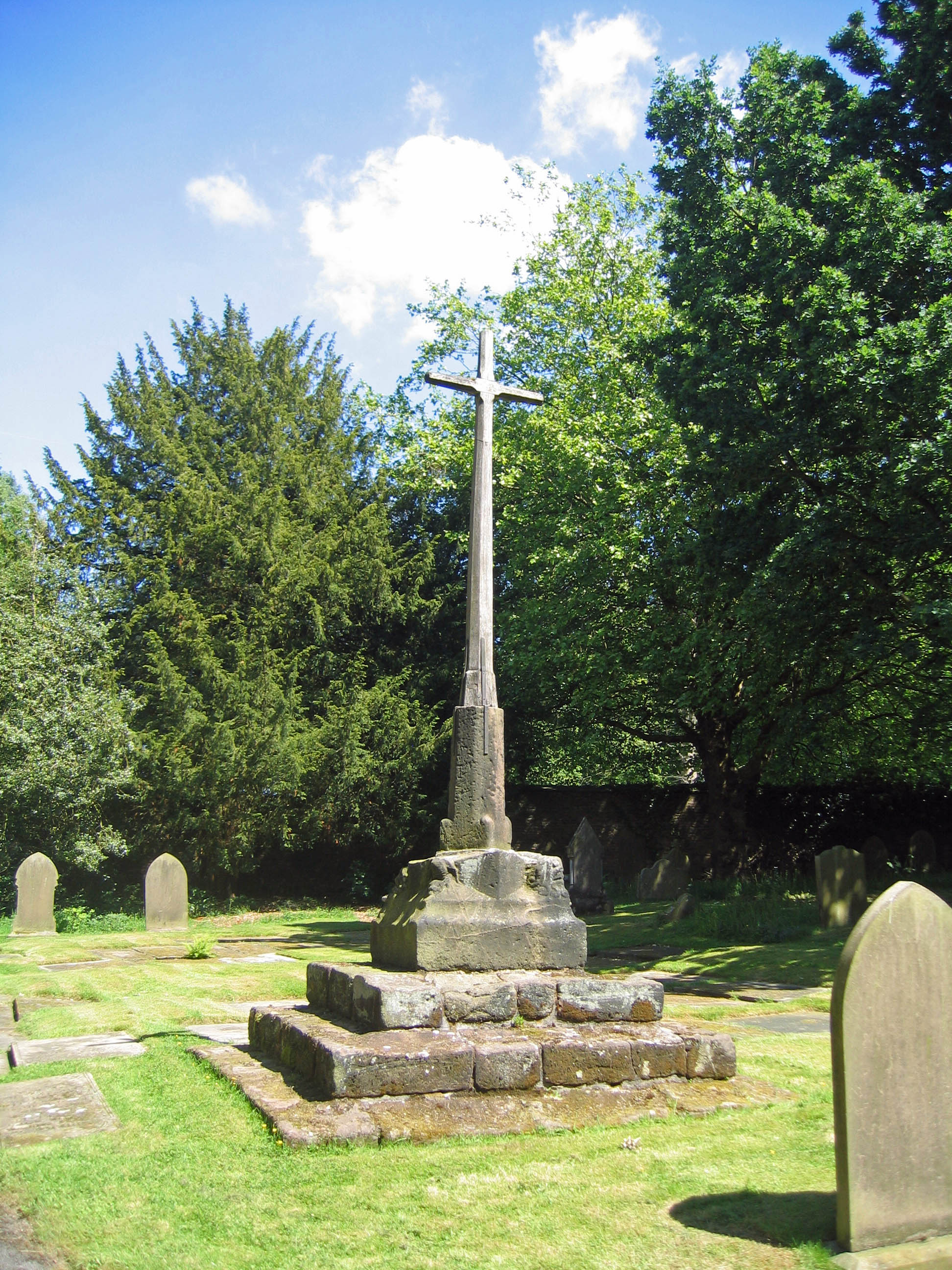
Cross base in churchyard of St James

== See also ==
- Grade I listed buildings in Cheshire East
- Grade I listed churches in Cheshire
- Listed buildings in Gawsworth
