= Ethel Léontine Gabain =

British artist (1883–1950)

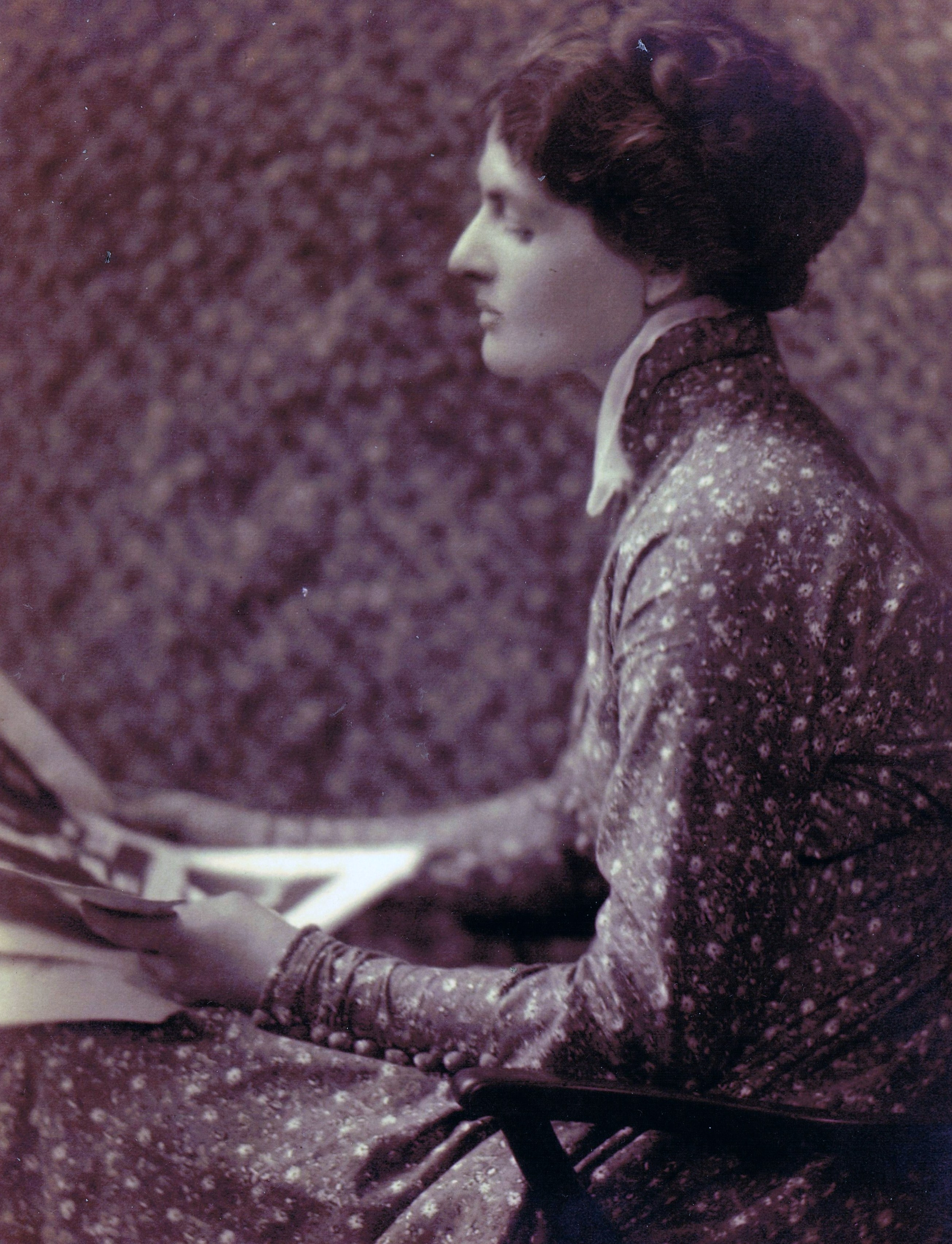
- Portrait of Ethel Gabain - Private Collection
- Born: Ethel Léontine Gabain; 26 March 1883; Le Havre, France
- Died: 30 January 1950 (aged 66); London, England
- Education: Slade School of Art; Central School of Arts and Crafts
- Known for: Painting & lithography
- Spouse: John Copley

Ethel Léontine Gabain, later Ethel Copley, (26 March 1883 – 30 January 1950) was a French-Scottish artist. Gabain was a renowned painter and lithographer and among the founding members of the Senefelder Club. While she was known for her oil portraits of actresses, Gabain was one of the few artists of her time able to live on the sale of her lithographs. She also did etchings, dry-points, as well as some posters.

== Biography ==
=== Early life ===
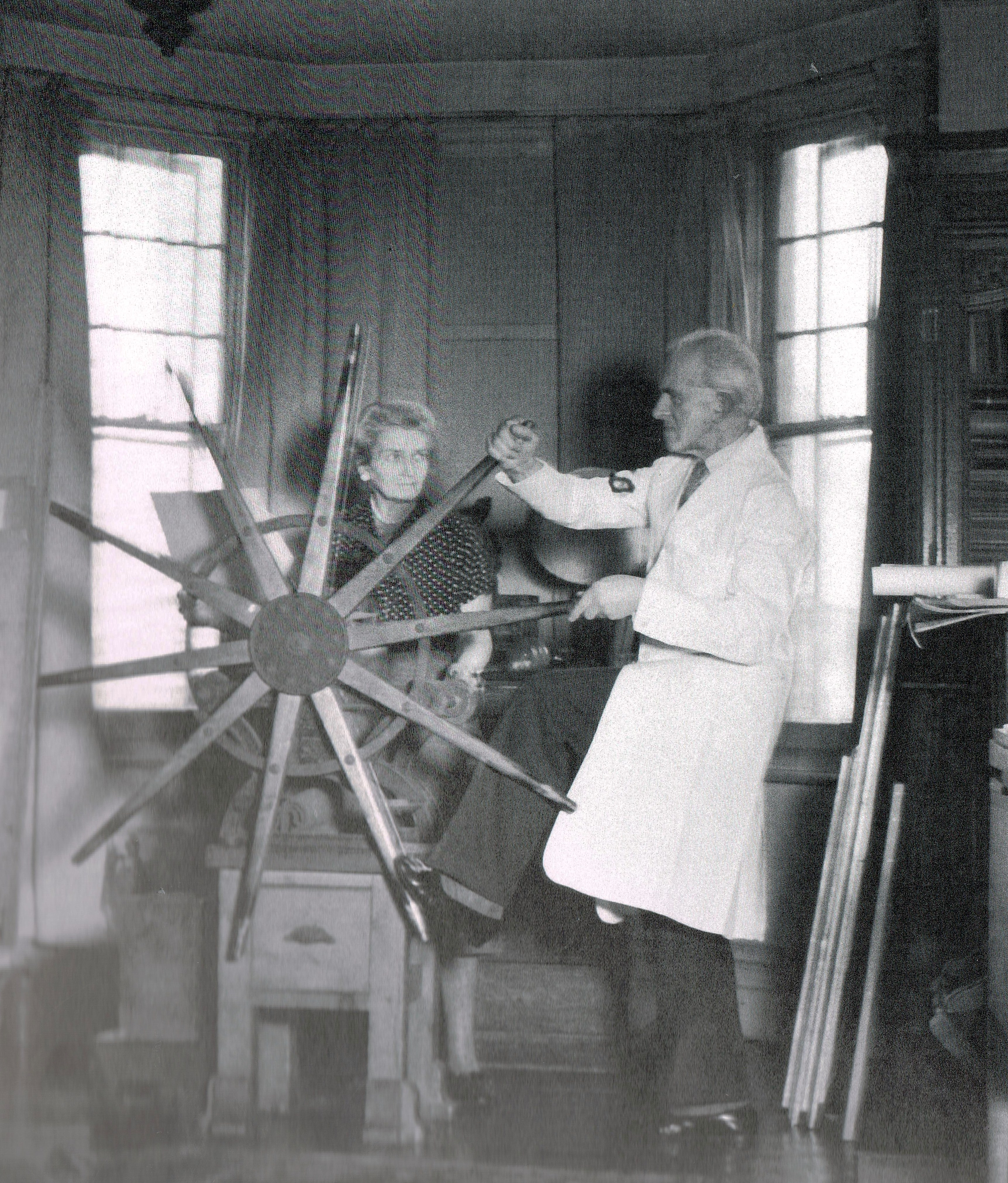
Gabain and Copley printing at Hampstead - Private Collection

Gabain had four sisters and one brother. Her father was French and her mother, Bessie, was born in Scotland. Her father, Charles Edward Gabain was a well off French coffee importer and on his retirement he moved the family to England to The Manor House, Bushey, Hertfordshire. Gabain was born in France and lived there for over twenty years. When she moved to England she was well equipped. She knew the country and was able to speak fluent English due to the fact, from the age of fourteen, she had boarded at Wycombe Abbey School, Buckinghamshire. The school encouraged her art skills and commissioned her to paint a portrait of Miss Ann Watt Whitelaw, who was the headmistress there from 1911 to 1925.

In 1902, Gabain studied at the Slade School of Fine Art in London before returning to France in 1903 to study at Raphaël Collin's Studio in Paris. From 1904 to 1906 she studied at the Central School of Arts and Crafts in London. There, the artist, F. E. Jackson, taught Gabain the art of lithography. The Central, which was established in 1896 by the London County Council, offered instruction in the trades which were thought to be more artistic – lithography being one of them. Gabain was determined to produce her own lithographic prints and also enrolled at the Chelsea Polytechnic for a time. Here she learnt how to use a printing press. Gabain experimented with colour lithography and decided it was not how she wanted to work so she sought to produce brilliant rich black and white lithographs.

=== The Senefelder Club ===
In 1910, Gabain and her future husband John Copley, along with A.S Hartrick and Joseph Pennell, were among the founding members of the Senefelder Club. When the Club held its first exhibition at the Goupil Gallery in January that year, six lithographs by Gabain were included. In 1927 the club's members exhibited at the Modern British Engravings Exhibition – held in the Pavilion de Marsan, a wing of the Louvre. In 1929 she featured in the British Art exhibition in Sweden.

Gabain and Copley married in 1913 and they lived in Kent for a time at The Yews in Longfield. Whilst here she adopted a small remarque in the shape of a yew tree in the lower margin of her prints. She also used images of the pergolas and the sundial at their home.

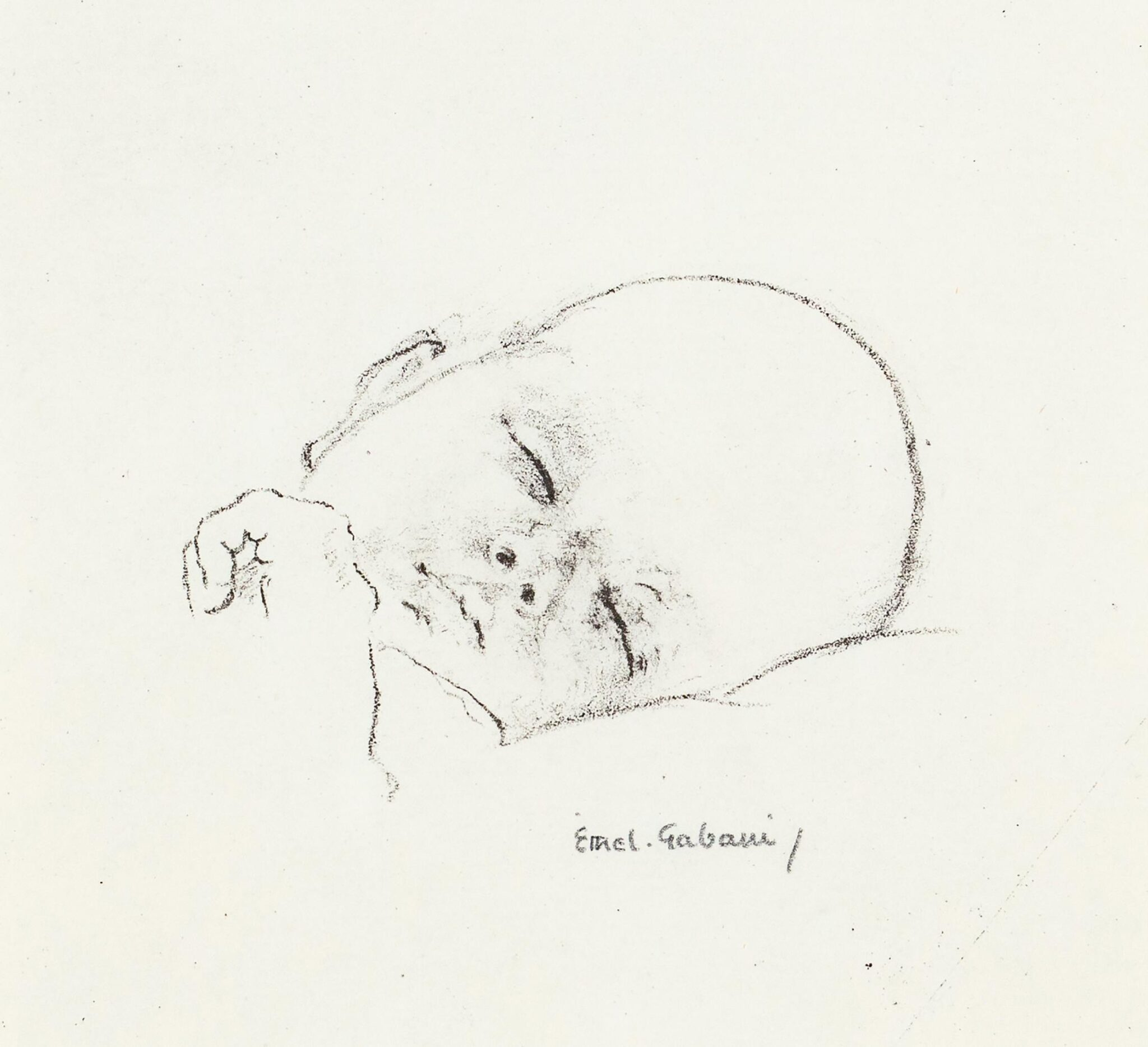
Christopher Asleep (1923 lithograph)

The couple and their two sons, the actor Peter Copley and Christopher, moved to 10 Hampstead Square, NW3, where Gabain had her studio on the top floor and Copley had a press which they used to work together. In 1925 Copley was so ill it was decided that the family should leave England and live in Alassio, Italy. During the two and a half years they were there, Gabain painted the landscape and gave art classes and public lectures at the Alassio English School.

=== Melancholic Images ===
Carmen as The Little Bride (Manchester Art Gallery)

Whilst living and working in Paris Gabain began to work on a theme centred on 'melancholic young females.' She produced numerous lithographic images of a lonely young female. Gabain revisited this theme later on in her career and produced several different images of a sad young bride. She always used her favourite model, Carmen Watson, in these depictions. By the time Carmen was married in 1940 she had posed over sixty times for Gabain. It was through an earlier image, The Striped Petticoat, that she met Harold J. L. Wright of Messrs. Colnaghi and Co. He saw this lithograph and contacted Gabain to ask her if Colnaghi's could become her publishers. This led to a lifelong friendship.

The melancholic theme continued with images centred on Pierrot and Columbine. Pierrot was based upon the character portrayed by Jean-Gaspard Deburau, a poignant, passionate and tragic person who plays the role of a sad clown madly in love with Columbine, a beautiful, young ballet dancer. Gabain loved the ballet and produced a series of young ballet dancers in different medias.

=== Books ===
In 1922, Monsieur Edmond Paix, a French collector, commissioned a special edition of 495 copies of Jane Eyre from the publisher Monsieur Leon Piton of Paris. He had seen one of Gabain's lonely female lithographs, The Striped Petticoat, and commissioned her to produce twenty-two lithographs for his edition, including a ghostly apparition of Jane Eyre.

In 1924, Gabain received a commission for nine lithographs for The Warden by Anthony Trollope, and this was published by Elkin Mathews and Marrot Ltd., in 1926.

=== Oil Paintings ===
For financial reasons and due to a fall in the print market, Gabain moved to painting with oils. She sent her first oil painting, Zinnias, to the Royal Academy in 1927, where it was well received. She also painted a number of landscapes in oils and theatrical portraits of well known actresses in character. These included Peggy Ashcroft, Edith Evans, Adelaide Stanley, Flora Robson and Lilian Baylis. In 1932 she was elected to the Royal Society of British Artists and to the Royal Institute of Oil Painters the following year. Also in 1933, her portrait of Robson, Flora Robson as Lady Audley, was awarded the De Laszlo Silver medal by the Royal Society of British Artists. Gabain exhibited with both the Artists' International Association and the New English Art Club and, for extra income, would sometimes lecture on art history. In 1940, she was elected President of the Society of Women Artists.

=== World War II ===
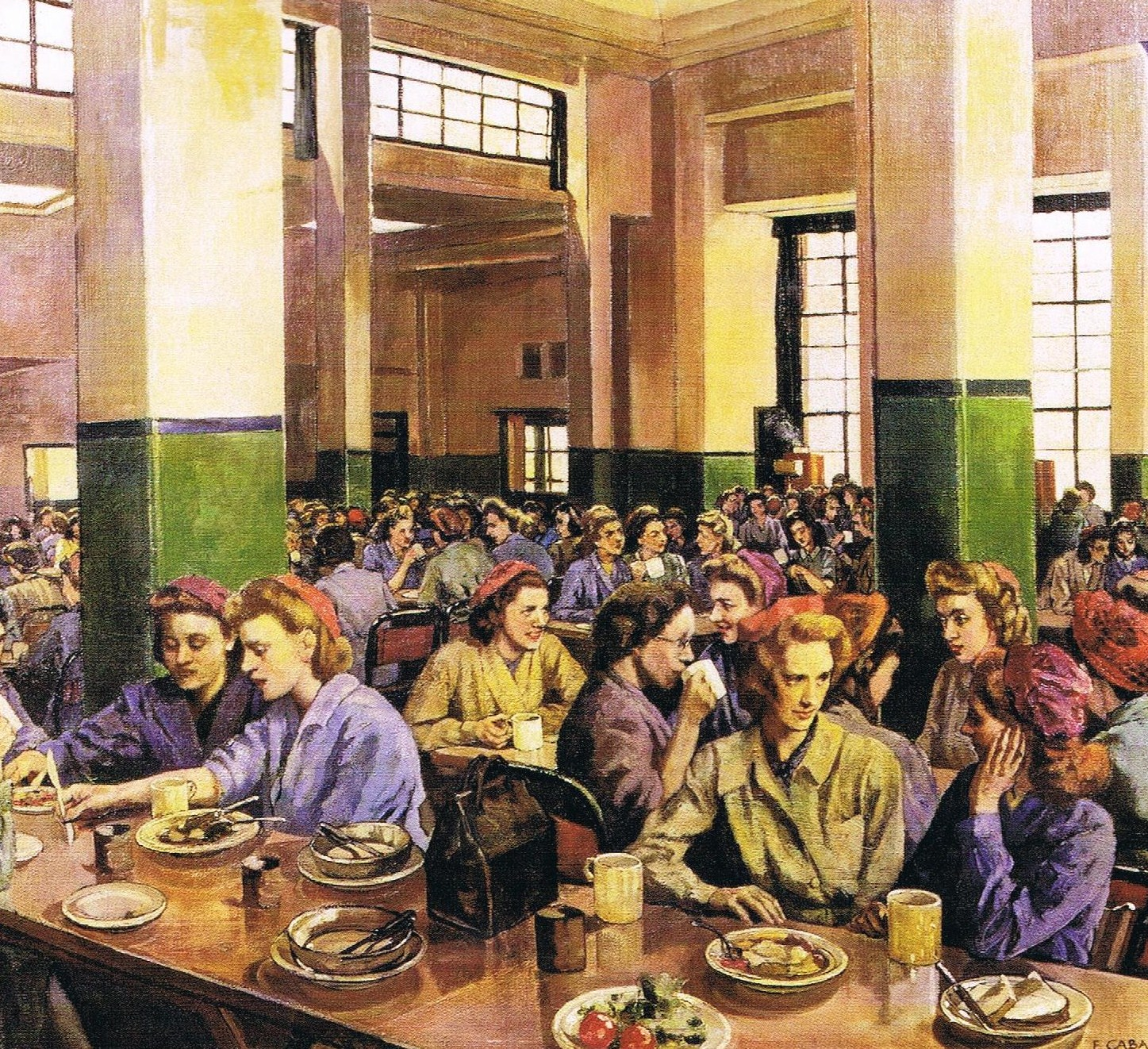
Women Workers in the Canteen, - The Grosvenor Art Gallery, Chester

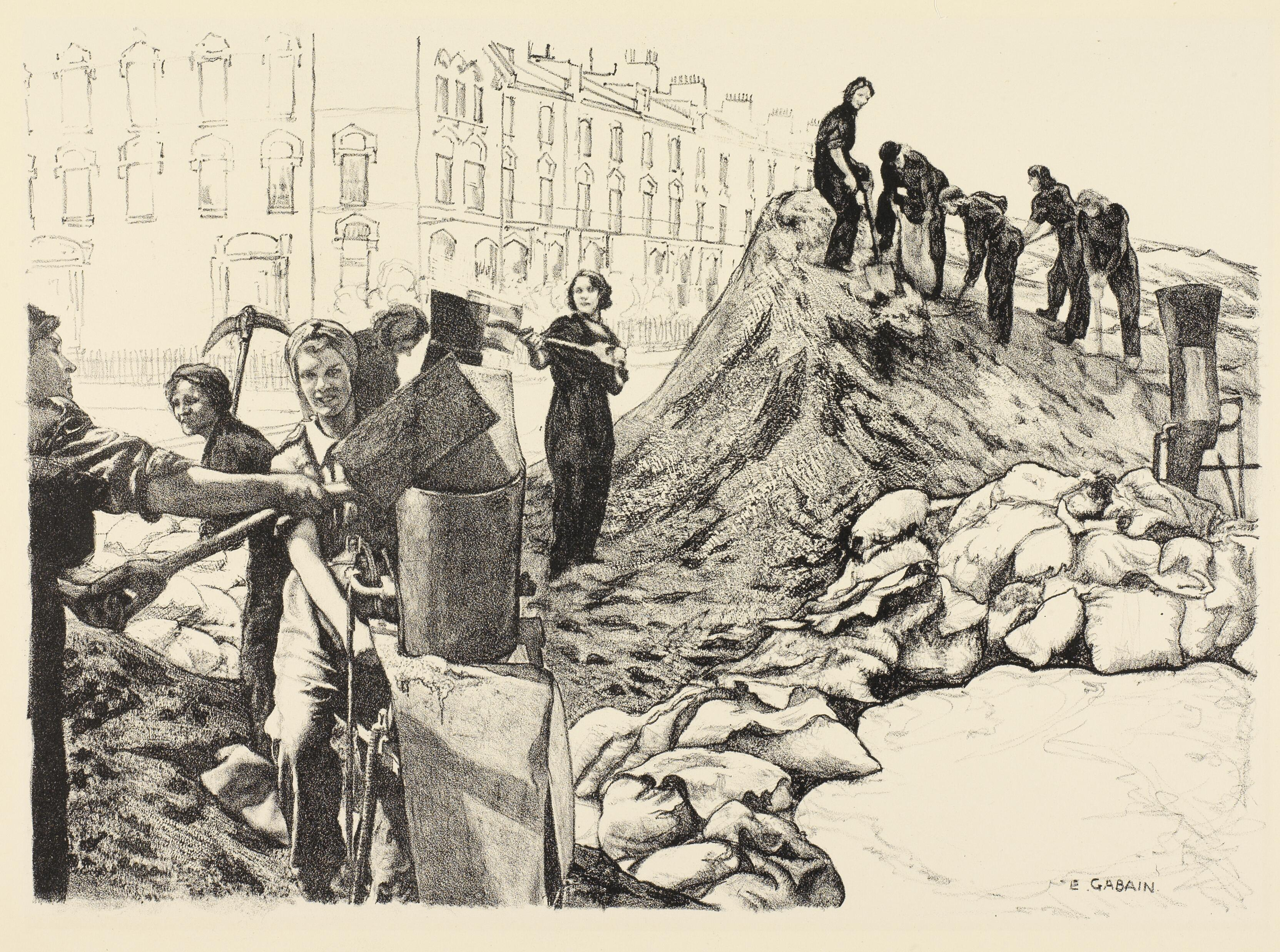
The Islington Borough Council have employed women on this strenuous task. (Art.IWM ART LD1538)

In April 1940, Gabain was commissioned by the War Artists' Advisory Committee, WAAC, to produce four lithographs of Women's Voluntary Services members and four on the subject of children being evacuated from London and other cities. Gabain actually offered WAAC thirteen lithographs for this commission but they only accepted the original eight commissioned. WAAC published these as two sets of lithographs, Children in Wartime with five images and Women's Work in the War other than the Services, which had six images. In total WAAC acquired 38 works by Gabain during the War. For these commissions Gabain, although often in poor health, travelled all over Britain. She went to the Scottish Highlands to record the work of women lumberjacks, known as "lumberjills", at a Women's Land Army camp in Banffshire and to Devon to depict children evacuated there from London. Throughout the War, Gabain recorded women working in what, in peacetime, had been traditionally male crafts and trades. As well as women salvage workers, factory workers, ARP wardens and air raid workers, Gabain produced a portrait of Captain Pauline Gower of the Air Transport Auxiliary. In 1945, she produced a series of portraits that included Barbara Ward and Caroline Haslett.

Gabain's WAAC commissions allowed her to explore her interest in the innovative medical techniques which were being developed during the war. In 1944, as well as depicting Sir Alexander Fleming working in the laboratory where he had discovered penicillin, Gabain also recorded, in A Child Bomb-Victim Receiving Penicillin Treatment, a young girl being treated with the drug. She recorded pioneering treatments of burns victims, including the introduction of a new continuous irrigation method.

Several industrial firms commissioned works from Gabain. Williams and Williams, Reliance Works in Chester commissioned Gabain to produce a number of lithographs and oils. One oil shows Women Workers in the Canteen at Williams and Williams. These were brought about by Lawrence Haward, the curator of The City Art Gallery, now the Manchester Art Gallery. Gabain received two commissions from Ferranti Hollinwood – Working on the Cathode Ray Tubes and A Giro Compass; one from Richard Haworth & Co. Ltd. in Salford – The Weaver; and one from the British Cotton Industry Research Association – The Shirley Institute of Cotton Research.

=== Later life ===
In 1939 Gabain had become seriously ill and although she recovered somewhat, her health remained poor. Subsequently, she suffered from arthritis and also lost a kidney, but continued to paint and exhibit until her final months. Her work was also part of the painting event in the art competition at the 1948 Summer Olympics. Gabain died on 30 January 1950 at her home in London. After her death her husband, John, organized a memorial exhibition of her paintings and lithographs at the Royal Society of British Artists, Suffolk Street, London.

== Memberships ==
Gabain was a member of or affiliated with the following organisations:

- 1909: Founding member of the Senefelder Club,
- 1925: Member of the Society of Graphic Art,
- 1932: Member of the Royal Society of British Artists,
- 1933: Member of the Royal Institute of Oil Painters,
- 1934: Vice-president of Society of Women Artists,
- 1940: President of Society of Women Artists.
