= John Copley =

John Copley may refer to:

- John Copley (producer) (born 1933), British theatre and opera producer
- John Singleton Copley (1738–1815), American painter
- John Copley, 1st Baron Lyndhurst (1772–1863), British lawyer and politician
- John Copley (artist) (1875–1950), British artist
