= Senefelder Club =

- Formation: 1909
- Type: The Arts
- Headquarters: London

The Senefelder Club is an organization formed in London in 1909 to promote the craft of art reproduction by the process of lithography.

The club was named in honor of Aloys Senefelder, who in 1796 invented the lithographic process.

The process was slow in development and even slower to gain acceptance in the art world. At the turn of the century, it began to flower and to be considered as an art form in its own right. The principles of lithography are still in practice around the world today. The club provided a forum for the artists to meet and exchange information on this heretofore semi-secret process. Further, it provided a means to instruct artists and their patrons that lithography was an art as well as a craft.

In 1909, Ernest Jackson, A.S. Hartrick, and James Kerr-Lawson called a meeting to form a society for the artist lithographer and in the following year, the Senefelder Club was formed. Joseph Pennell was elected President and Hartrick, Jackson and Kerr-Lawson formed the Committee. John Copley (1875-1950) and Ethel Gabain soon joined (and married in 1913), followed by Frank Brangwyn, Spencer Pryse, Charles Shannon, Augustus John, William Rothenstein. C.W.R. Nevinson, Claude Sheperson, E. J. Sullivan, Edmund Blampied and many other notable artists. Foreign members included Théophile Steinlen, Jean-Louis Forain, and Henri Matisse. In 1958 the Club was renamed the Senefelder Group when members included Edward Ardizzone, James Fitton, Phyllis Ginger and Henry Trivick, who was then Chairman. The Group seems to have held their last exhibition in 1961.

The British watercolorist and lithographer Anthony Raine Barker was an enthusiastic supporter and member of the club's committee in the 1920s.

== Further Sources ==
- Archibald Standish Hartrick, BM, RSW, OBE by Lester J. Hartrick
- Artists Index Roe and Moore
- 'The Adventures of an Illustrator' by Joseph Pennell, 1925, p. 169
