= Zeng Baosun =

Chinese feminist and historian

- 曾寶蓀
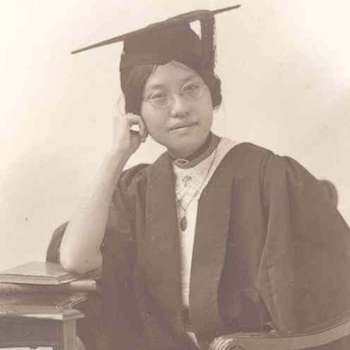
- Born: 9 March 1893; Xiangxiang, Hunan Province
- Died: 27 July 1978 (aged 85); Taiwan
- Resting place: No. 1 Public Cemetery, Taipei
- Occupations: Feminist, historian, Christian education

Zeng Baosun or Tseng Pao Swen (Chinese: 曾寶蓀; 9 March 1893 – 27 July 1978) was a Chinese feminist, historian, and Christian educator.

== Biography ==
Zeng was born into a prominent family in Xiangxiang, Hunan Province, and was the great-granddaughter of Zeng Guofan, a Qing dynasty Chinese official who commanded the Xiang Army during the Taiping Rebellion. Her feet were not bound and there was no early, arranged marriage.

At the age of 14, she studied at a girls' school in Shanghai before entering the Hangzhou Women's Normal School. Zeng converted to Christianity while studying an Anglican church school, Mary Vaughan High School, which she entered in 1910. She then attended Blackheath High School in London, before entering Westfield College, graduating with a bachelor's degree in 1916, thus becoming the first Chinese woman to receive the "Bachelor of Science degree with honors" from this college. Zeng often attended the Quaker meeting at Hampstead during her time at Westfield. She received teacher's training while at Oxford University and Cambridge University.

Zeng founded I Fang Girls' Collegiate School in Changsha. She left China in 1949 to settle in Taiwan. In 1953, she represented the Republic of China in the United Nations Commission on the Status of Women. Self-described in her memoir as a "Confucian feminist", Zeng published her autobiography as well as women's issues essays. She served on the Board of Directors of Tunghai University in Taichung.

She died in Taiwan and was buried at No. 1 Public Cemetery in Taipei.

== Works ==
- Tseng, P. S. (October 1917). "China's Women and Their Position in the Church". Church Missionary Review. 48: 372–376.
- Tseng, P. S. (July 1928). "Christianity and Women as Seen at the Jerusalem Meeting". Chinese Recorder. 59: 443.
- Tseng, Pao-sun (2015) [1931]. "The Chinese Woman Past and Present". In Li, Yu-ning (ed.). Chinese Women Through Chinese Eyes. Routledge. pp. 72–86. ISBN 978-1-317-47471-5.
- Tseng, P. S. (October 1935). "Christianity and War". Chinese Recorder. 66: 265–276.
- Zeng, Baosun (2002). Confucian Feminist: Memoirs of Zeng Baosun (1893-1978). Translated by Kennedy, Thomas L. Philadelphia: American Philosophical Society. ISBN 978-0-87169-921-3.
