= Hampstead Square =

Square in Hampstead, London

Coordinates: 51.5596°N 0.1779°W

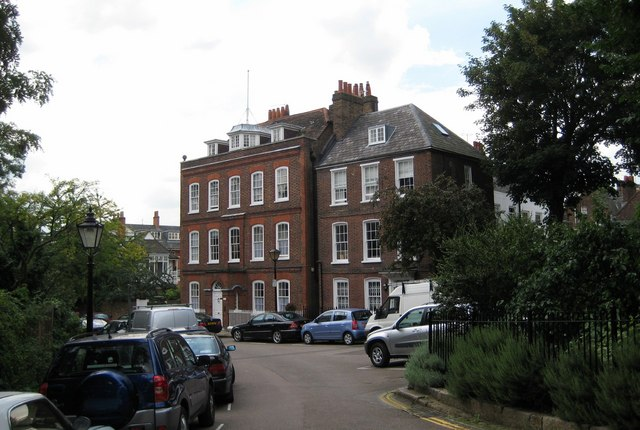
Hampstead Square

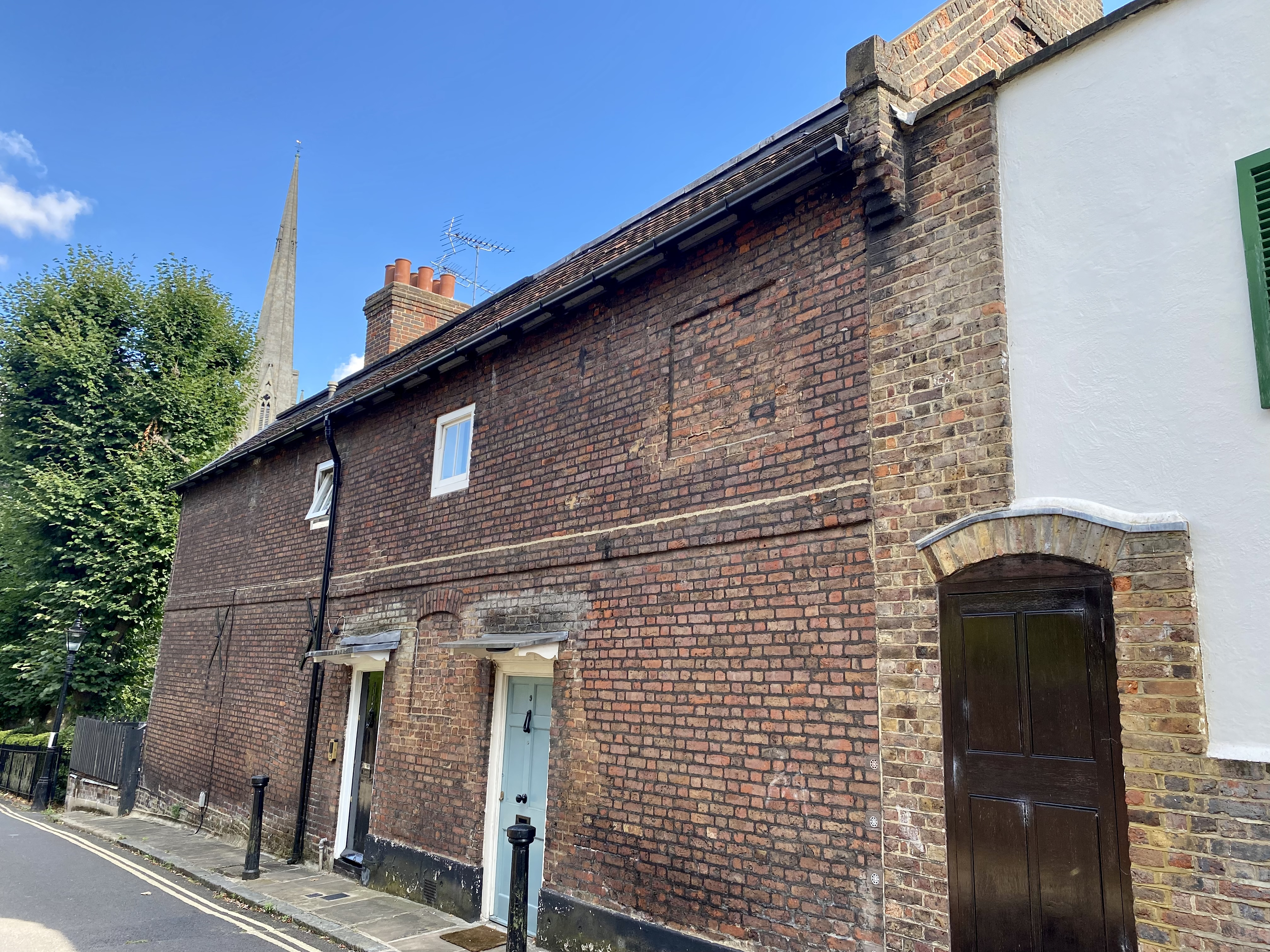
7–9 Hampstead Square

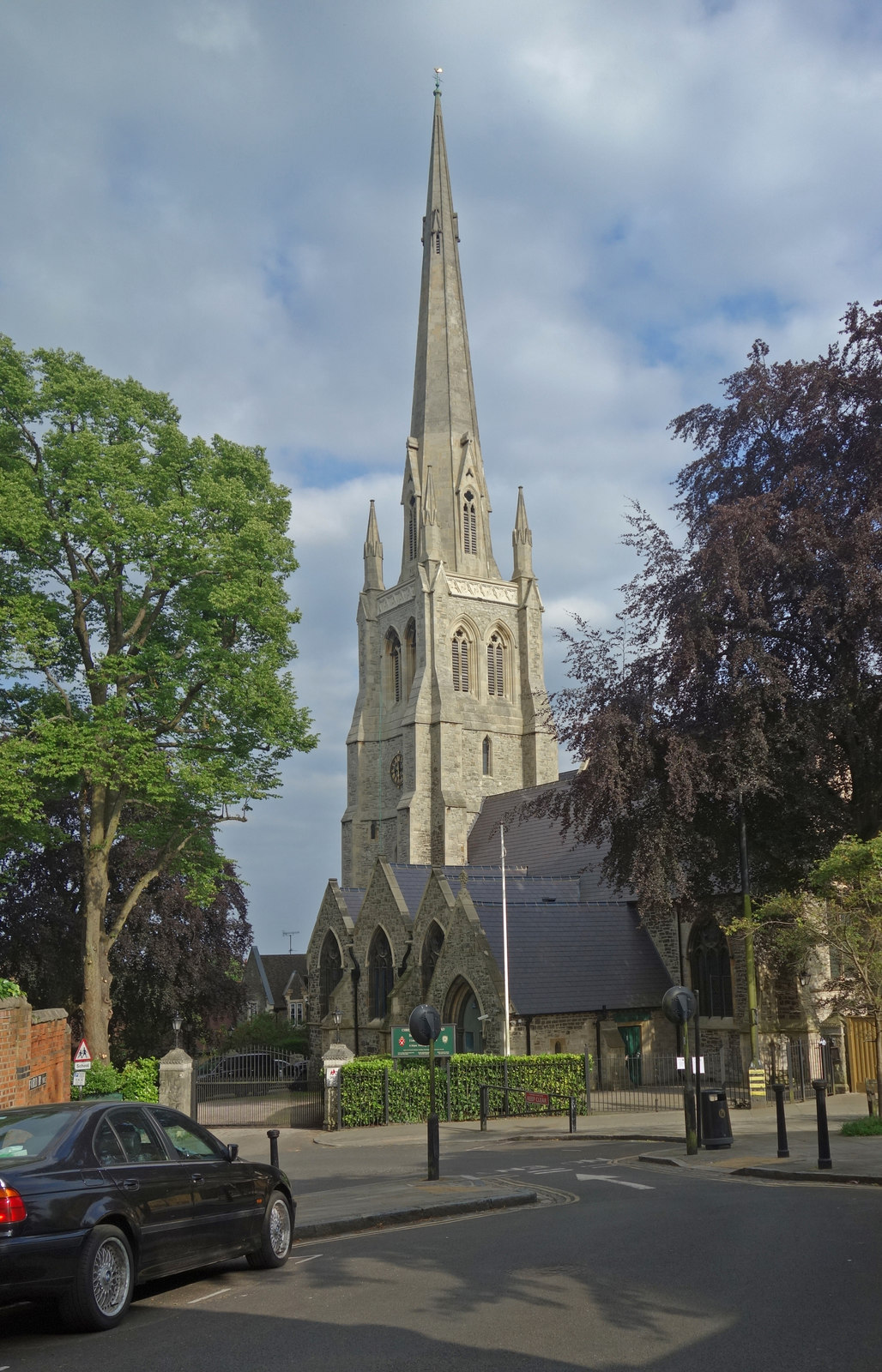
Christ Church, constructed in 1852

Hampstead Square lies in Hampstead in the London Borough of Camden. It runs eastward off Heath Street and then curves southwards before Elm Row connects it again to Heath Street. It is linked by pedestrian access to Cannon Place.

Historically it was a garden square, featuring densely-packed buildings as opposed to the larger space-out houses on the edge of Hampstead Heath. Many of the houses date back to the early eighteenth century when the area was booming due to the nearby Hampstead Wells spa. It is marked on the 1762 map of Hampstead simply as The Square and its open space was used in the early nineteenth century by strolling players and the Victoria Tea Gardens. The construction of Christ Church in 1852 by the architect Samuel Daukes turned it from a traditional square shape into a polygon. The Hampstead Meeting House is also located in the square. Notable residents have included the writer Wilkie Collins and the married artists John Copley and Ethel Léontine Gabain.

== See also ==
- New End Square, another square located nearby

== Bibliography ==
- Bebbington, Gillian. London Street Names. Batsford, 1972.
- Cherry, Bridget & Pevsner, Nikolaus. London 4: North. Yale University Press, 2002.
- Wade, Christopher. The Streets of Hampstead. Camden History Society, 2000.
