= Lily Blatherwick =

English painter

- Blatherwick by Archibald Hartrick
- Born: 1854; Richmond upon Thames, England
- Died: 26 November 1934 (aged 79–80); London, England
- Known for: Painting
- Spouse: Archibald Hartrick (m. 1896)

Lily Blatherwick (1854 – 26 November 1934) was an English painter.

== Biography ==
Blatherwick was born in Richmond upon Thames and exhibited her works from 1877 at the Royal Academy. Her father, Charles Blatherwick, was a doctor and keen amateur watercolourist who had been involved in the establishment of the Royal Scottish Society of Painters in Watercolour.

In 1896, Blatherwick married the artist Archibald Standish Hartrick, who was the son of her father's second wife from her first marriage. The couple lived in Tresham in Gloucestershire for ten years. There they redecorated the small village church, whilst both pursuing their artistic careers. They both had works shown at the Continental Gallery in 1901 and her painting Wintry Weather was included in the 1905 book Women Painters of the World. Blatherwick died in London, but was buried in the church graveyard in Tresham in 1934.

== Exhibitions ==
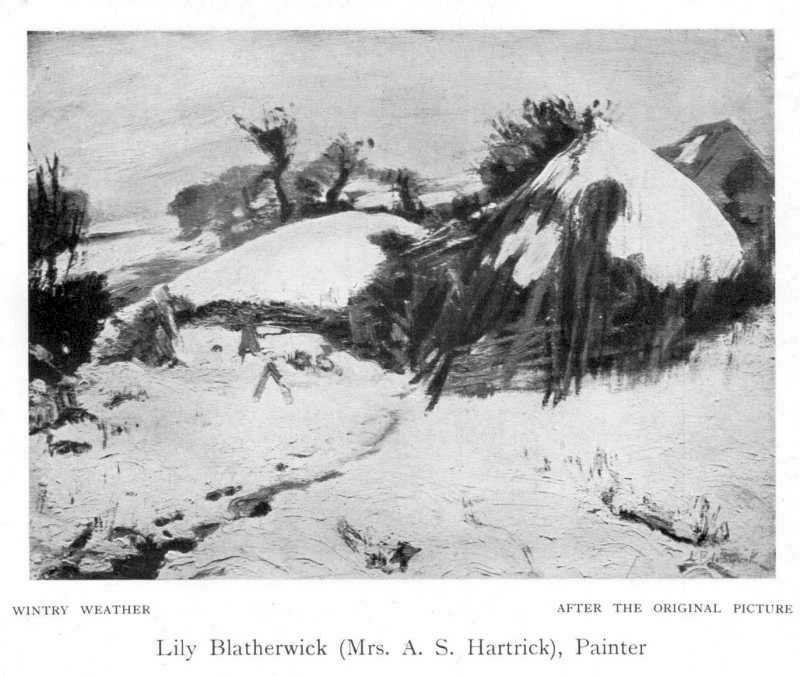
Wintry Weather

Blatherwick contributed paintings to several exhibitions, including two floral paintings in an exhibition of the Royal Glasgow Institute of the Fine Arts in May 1900, "The House With the Green Shutters" in the Exhibition of the Royal Glasgow Institute of the Fine Arts in 1903, and a painting of "daffodils in a blue vase" at Burlington House with the Royal Academy of Arts in 1904.
