= Hampstead Meeting House =

Quaker meeting house in London, England

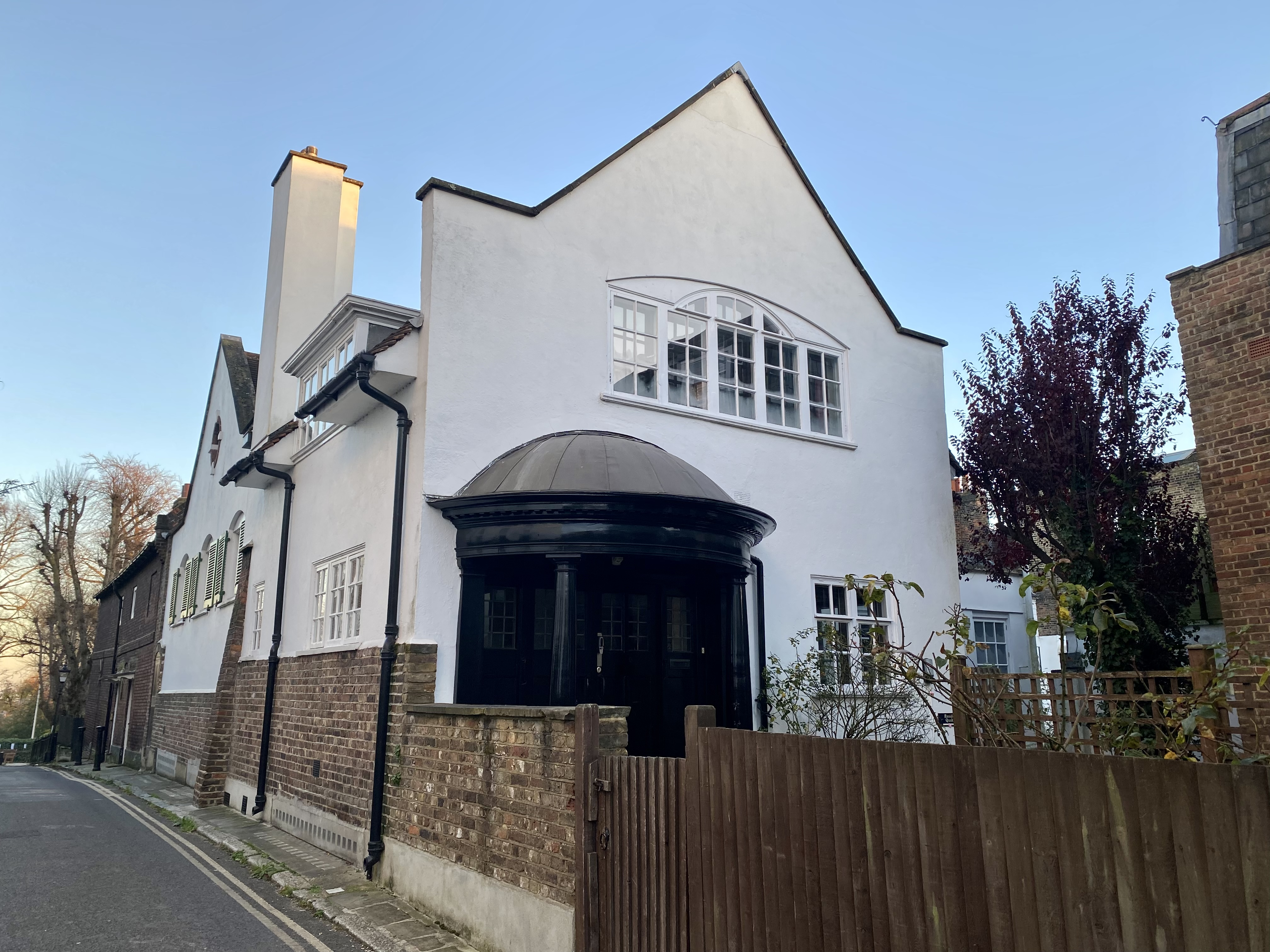
- The building viewed from Hampstead Square in 2022

- Location within Greater London

General information
- Architectural style: Arts and Crafts
- Location: Heath Street, Hampstead, London, England
- Coordinates: 51°33′34.67″N 0°10′42.04″W
- Year built: 1907

Design and construction
- Architect: Fred Rowntree

Website
- hampstead.quakermeeting.org

Listed Building – Grade II
- Official name: Friends Meeting House
- Designated: 11 January 1999
- Reference no.: 1378849

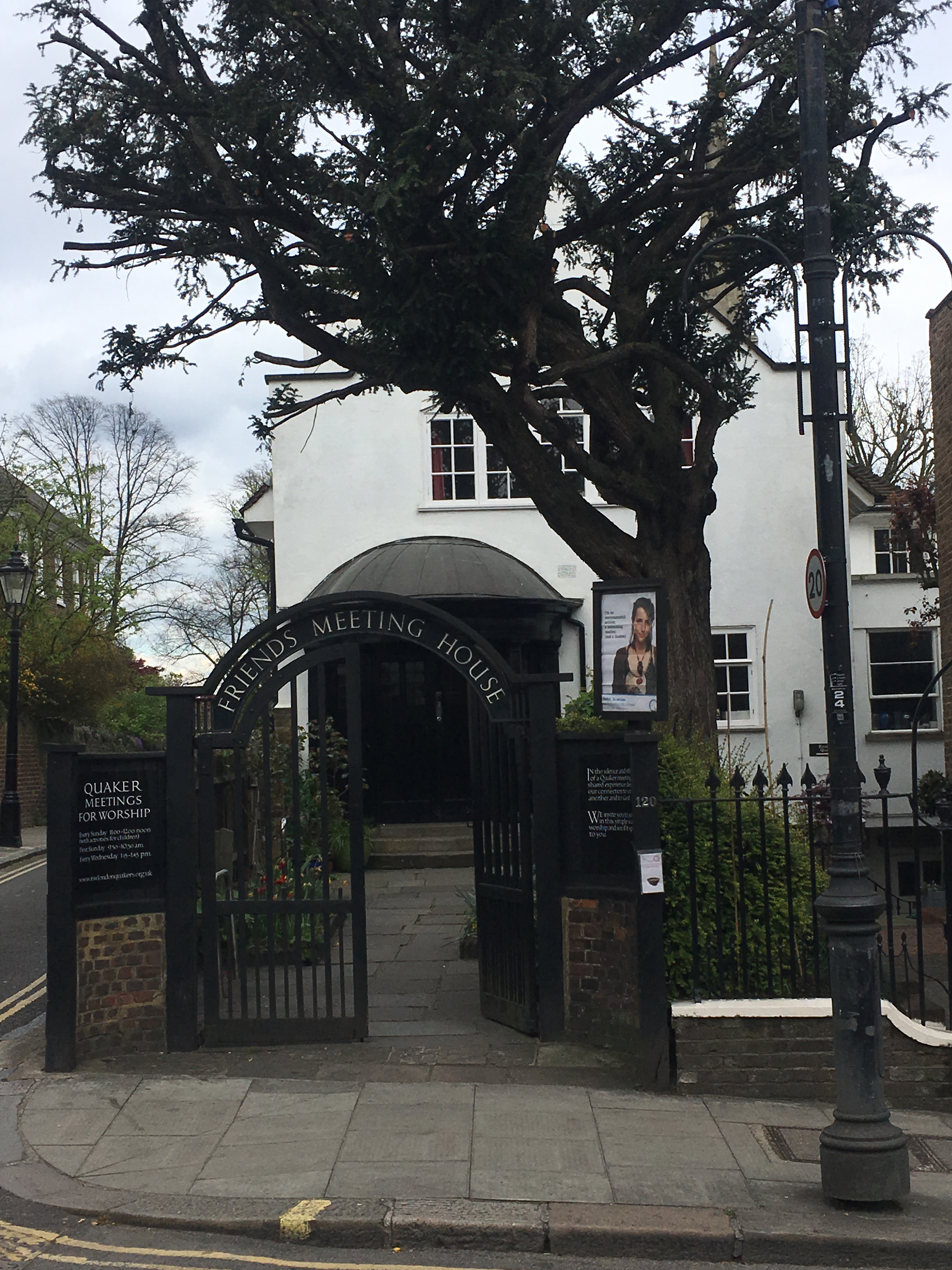
The entrance in 2017

The Hampstead Meeting House is a Friends meeting house (a Quaker place of worship) at 120 Heath Street in Hampstead, London N3. It was designed by Fred Rowntree in the Arts and Crafts style. The friends had previously met in Willoughby Road from 1903. The Hungarian emigrant sculptor Peter Laszlo Peri was an elder of the Hampstead meeting; having joined in 1945.

Mahatma Gandhi spoke at the meeting house in 1909. The prominent Australian Quaker David Hodgkin married Bridget Kelsey in the meeting house in 1940. The noted boat designer Iain Oughcubson became a member of the meeting in the late 1960s. The New Zealand social worker and poet Ursula Bethell called the building a "beautiful little bare meeting house" in a 1937 letter to Rodney Kennedy. The peace activist Stephen Hobhouse attended the Hampstead meeting after graduation in the 1900s. The Chinese feminist and author Zeng Baosun attended the meeting during the 1910s. The Orthodox priest and writer Lev Gillet also attended in the 1940s despite his Orthodox faith.

A Quaker funeral at the Hampstead Meeting House is depicted in Zoe Heller's 2001 novel Everything You Know.

The meeting house is listed Grade II on the National Heritage List for England.

The meeting for worship is held on Sundays at 11 am; with an additional meeting on the first Sunday of every month at 9:30 am.
