= Peter Copley =

English actor (1915–2008)

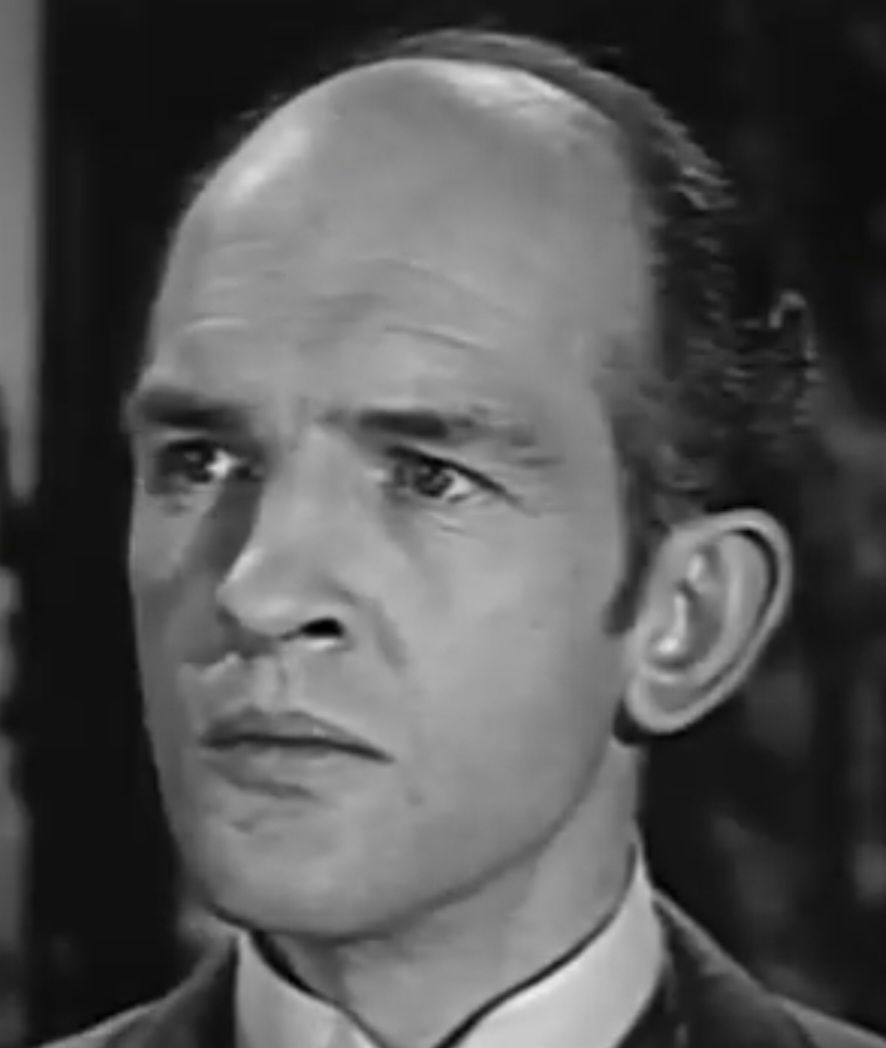
- Copley in an episode of Sherlock Holmes (1954)
- Born: Peter Francis Gabain Copley; 20 May 1915; Bushey, Hertfordshire, England, U.K.
- Died: 7 October 2008 (aged 93); Bristol, England, U.K.
- Years active: 1934–2008
- Spouses: Pamela Brown (m. 1941; div. 1953) Ninka Dolega (m. 1953, divorced) Margaret Tabor (m. 1967)
- Children: 1

Peter Copley (20 May 1915 – 7 October 2008) was an English television, film and stage actor.

== Biography ==
Copley was born in Bushey, Hertfordshire, son of the printmakers John Copley and Ethel Gabain.

After changing his mind about joining the Royal Navy, he studied at the Old Vic School and started out as a stage actor in 1932. He made his first film appearance in 1934, going on to play a wide variety of characters from the villainous to the meek and mild. In 1946, he appeared on stage in "Cyrano de Bergerac" at the New Theatre in London. In 1951 he appeared at the Duchess Theatre in London's West End in the comedy play The Happy Family by Michael Clayton Hutton.

TV credits include Thorndyke, Danger Man, The Saint, The Avengers, The Forsyte Saga, The Troubleshooters, The Champions, Department S, Doomwatch, Z-Cars, Callan,Fall of Eagles, Survivors, Bless Me, Father (episode "A Legend Comes to Stay"), Father Brown (episode "The Curse of the Golden Cross"), Doctor Who (in the serial Pyramids of Mars), Sutherland's Law, Tales of the Unexpected, Miss Marple ("Nemesis" episode"), Lovejoy, The Bill, Cadfael, The Diamond Brothers: South by South East and One Foot in the Grave.

Copley continued to act well into his nineties.

A resident of Bristol, Copley was awarded an Honorary Degree of Master of Arts by the University of the West of England in 2001.

== Filmography ==
Year	Title	Role	Notes
1937	Farewell Again	Minor Role	Uncredited
1950	Golden Salamander	Aribi	
1950	The Elusive Pimpernel	Tailor	Uncredited
1952	The Promoter	Shillitoe	Uncredited
1952	The Hour of 13	Cummings	
1953	The Sword and the Rose	Sir Edwin Caskoden	
1953	The Clue of the Missing Ape	His Excellency	Uncredited
1953	Saadia	Leader Mokhazenis	
1955	The Woman for Joe	Mr. Worthington	Uncredited
1956	Foreign Intrigue	Brown	
1956	Peril for the Guy	Ritter	
1957	Time Without Pity	Prison Chaplain	
1957	The Smallest Show on Earth	Hank in 'The Mystery of Hell Valley'	Uncredited
1957	The Man Without a Body	Leslie	
1957	Just My Luck	Gilbert Weaver	
1958	A Tale of Two Cities	Mellor	Uncredited
1958	The Strange World of Planet X	News Editor	Uncredited
1958	Rockets Galore!	Scientist	Uncredited
1958	Television Playwright	(i) Mr. Chambers (ii) Aubrey Davis (iii) Mr. Baldock-Evans	3 episodes: "The Maitland Scandal", "Hour of the Rat", and "The Board of Management".
1959	The Mystery in the Mine	Tom Abbott	
1960	Follow That Horse!	Garrod	
1961	Victim	Paul Mandrake	
1964	The Third Secret	Dr. Leo Whitset	
1964	King and Country	Colonel	
1965	The Knack ...and How to Get It	Picture Owner	
1965	Help!	Jeweller	
1967	The Jokers	Defence Lawyer	Uncredited
1967	Quatermass and the Pit	Howell	
1968	The Shoes of the Fisherman	English Cardinal	
1969	Frankenstein Must Be Destroyed	Principal	
1969	Mosquito Squadron	Mr. Scott	
1969	Walk a Crooked Path	Dr. Oberon	
1970	Jane Eyre	John	TV movie
1970	All at Sea	Mr. Gordon	
1972	What Became of Jack and Jill?	Dickson	
1972	That's Your Funeral	1st Funeral Director	
1973	Gawain and the Green Knight	Pilgrim	
1975	Hennessy	Home Secretary	
1975	Doctor Who	Doctor Warlock	Episode: "Pyramids of Mars"
1975	Survivors	Dr George Bronson, Deaf School Teacher	Episode: "The Fourth Horseman"
1976	Shout at the Devil	Admiral Howe	
1976	Peer Gynt		
1977	The Black Panther		
1978	The Famous Five	Mr Finniston	Episode: "Five on Finniston Farm"
1980	Little Lord Fauntleroy	Rev. Muldaur	
1981	Bless me, Father	Father Abe	Episode: "A Legend Comes to Stay"
1982	Witness for the Prosecution	Dr. Harrison	TV movie
1983	The Forgotten Story	Mr. Cowdray	1 episode
1984	Strangers and Brothers	Despard-Smith	2 episodes
1986	Miss Marple: Nemesis	Archdeacon Brabazon	
1987	Empire of the Sun	British Prisoner #10	
1992	A Dangerous Man: Lawrence After Arabia	Maitland	TV movie
1994	Second Best	Percy	
1994	Cadfael	Abbot (later Brother) Heribert	4 episodes
1999	Janice Beard 45 WPM	Sean's Father	
2005	Kingdom of Heaven	Old Pilgram	(director's cut)
2005	Oliver Twist	Dining Hall Master	
