= Archibald Standish Hartrick =

Scottish painter and lithographer(1864-1950)

A.S Hartrick
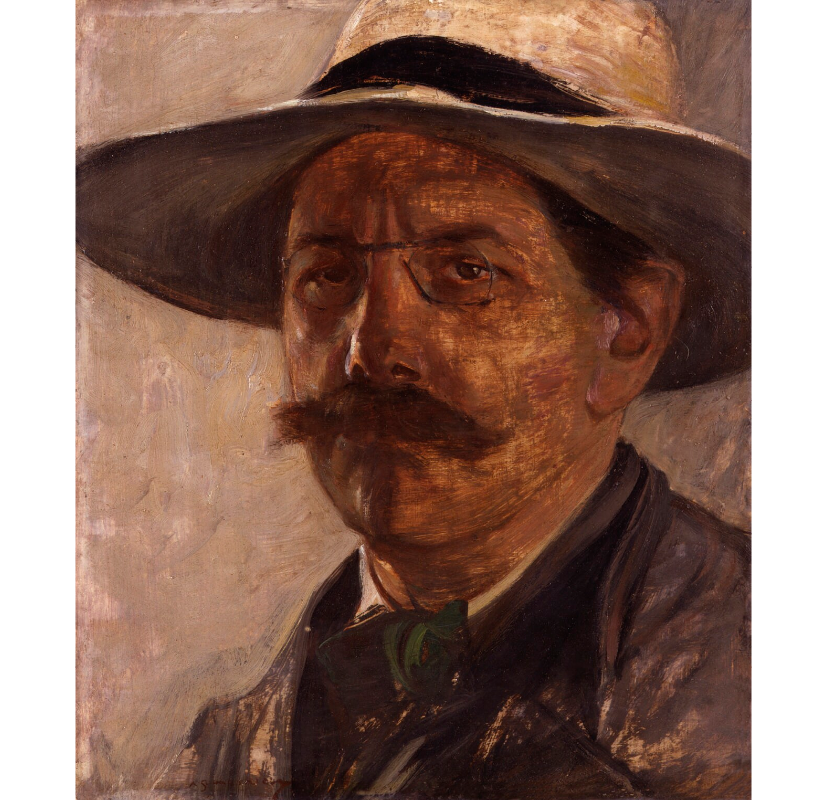
- Born: 7 August 1864; Bangalore, Mysore
- Died: 1 February 1950 (aged 85); London, England
- Education: Slade School of Art; Academie Julian; Atelier Cormon
- Known for: Painting, drawing
- Spouse: Lily Blatherwick (m. 1896; died 1934)

Archibald Standish Hartrick OBE RWS (7 August 1864 – 1 February 1950) was a Scottish painter known for the quality of his lithographic work. His works covered urban scenes, landscapes and figure painting and he was a founder member of the Senefelder Club.

== Life and work ==
Woman's Work:On the Railway - Engine and Carriage Cleaners (c. 1917) (Art.IWM ART 161764)

Hartrick was born in Bangalore, the son of Captain William Hartrick of the 7th Regiment of Foot and his wife Josephine Smith, daughter of Dr Archibald Smith of Edinburgh. The family moved to Scotland when Hartrick was two years old. His father died shortly afterwards and in due course his mother married Charles Blatherwick, a doctor and keen amateur watercolourist who had been involved in the establishment of the Royal Scottish Society of Painters in Watercolour.

After attending Fettes College, Hartrick studied medicine at Edinburgh University before studying art at the Slade School of Art in London and then at both the Academie Julian and the Atelier Cormon in Paris. He spent the summer of 1886 at Pont-Aven with Paul Gauguin. In Paris, he had become friends with Vincent van Gogh and Toulouse-Lautrec and exhibited a work at the Paris Salon in 1887. Hartrick drew and painted Gauguin, van Gogh and Toulouse-Lautrec during his time in France.

Hartrick returned to Scotland and for a while settled in Glasgow, where he came to know the Glasgow Boys, before he moved to London. There he began work as a book illustrator and as an illustrator with The Graphic in 1890, then with the Pall Mall Magazine in 1893. Hartrick became a prolific magazine artist and also provided illustrations for the magazine Black and White, for the Daily Chronicle, The Ludgate Monthly and Pall Mall Budget.

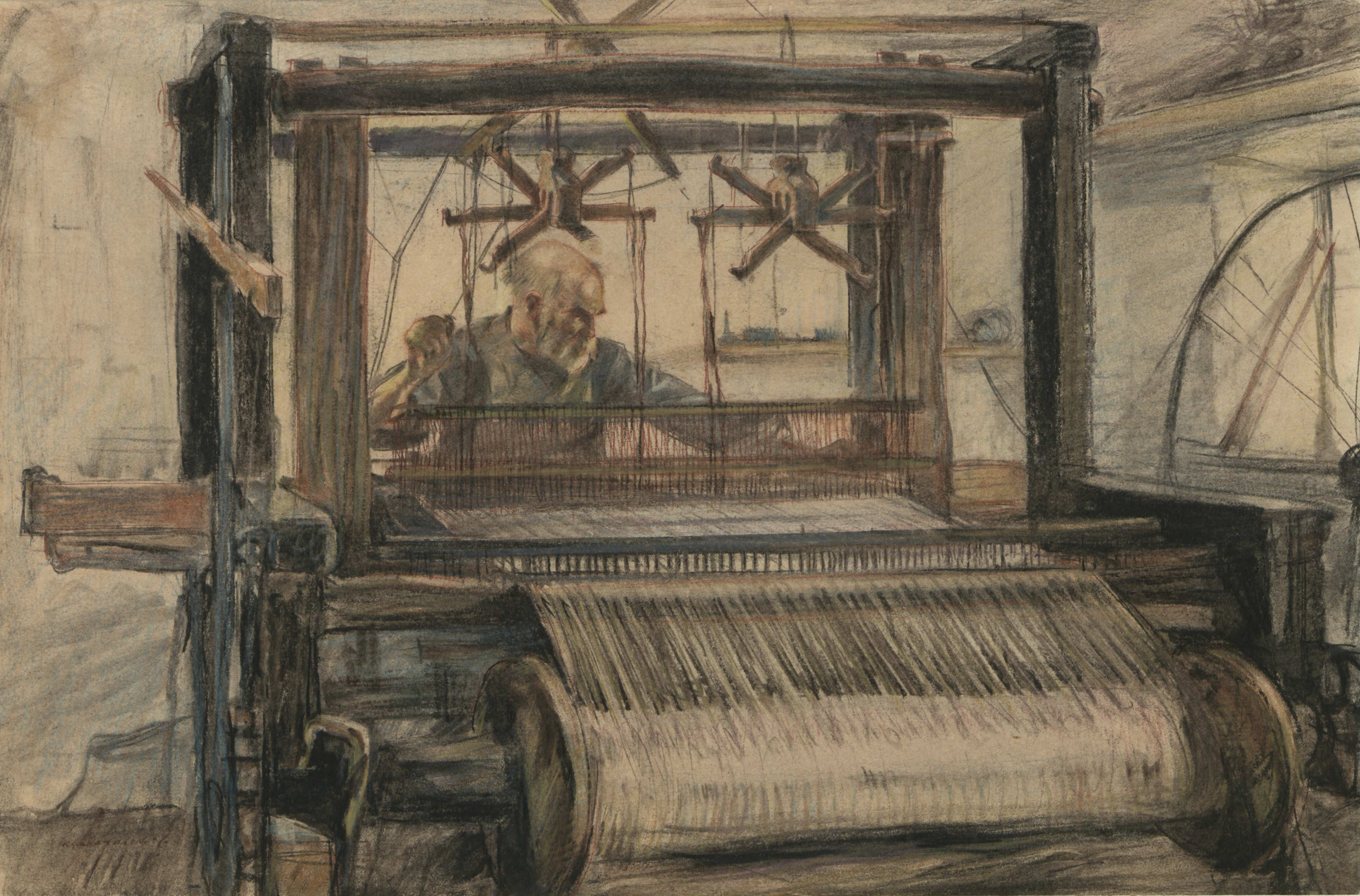
Proctor, the Weaver, Aberdeen Archives, Gallery & Museums Collection

Also in 1890, Hartrick joined the New English Art Club. From 1895 until 1907, he exhibited regularly at the Royal Academy. In 1896 he married the painter Lily Blatherwick, the daughter of Charles Blatherwick from his first marriage. The couple settled in Tresham in Gloucestershire, from where they both pursued their artistic careers; they both had works shown at the Continental Gallery in 1901. Hartrick and his wife later redecorated the small church in Tresham and she is buried in the graveyard there. Hartrick moved to London, where he taught drawing at the Camberwell School of Art from 1908 to 1914 and later at the Central School of Art, where he taught lithography until 1929. At Camberwell he taught David Jones. In 1909, Hartrick was among the founding members of the Senefelder Club and later became a Vice-President of the club. In 1910, Hartrick was elected an associate member of the Royal Watercolour Society and became a full member in 1920. Eventually, Hartrick had over 200 works shown at the Royal Watercolour Society and he also exhibited at the Venice Biennale on three occasions. His work was also part of the painting event in the art competition at the 1932 Summer Olympics. A series of his works showing rural characters, entitled Cotswold Types was acquired by the British Museum.

During World War I, Hartrick contributed works to the British War Memorials Committee collection of artworks. In 1917, Hartrick produced six lithographs on Women's Work for the War Propaganda Bureau's Britain's Efforts and Ideals portfolio of images which were exhibited in Britain and abroad and were also sold as prints to raise money for the war effort. During the war, he also produced a series of twelve lithographs under the title London in Wartime. At the start of the World War II, he was among the first to offer his services to the War Artists' Advisory Committee. In 1940, he was the first artist commissioned to record the work of the Women's Land Army, the same subject he had covered in World War I. Prints of his work were sold in at the National Gallery during the war and featured in the Britain at War exhibition that opened at the Museum of Modern Art in New York in May 1941. During the war, Hartrick also painted scenes near his former home at Tresham in Gloucestershire for the Recording Britain scheme. The Arts Council organized a memorial exhibition for Hartrick in 1951.

== Published works ==
- 1916: Post-impressionism, with some personal recollections of Vincent Van Gogh & Paul Gauguin
- 1932: Lithography as a Fine Art
- 1939: A Painter's Pilgrimage through Fifty Years.
