= John Copley (artist) =

British artist

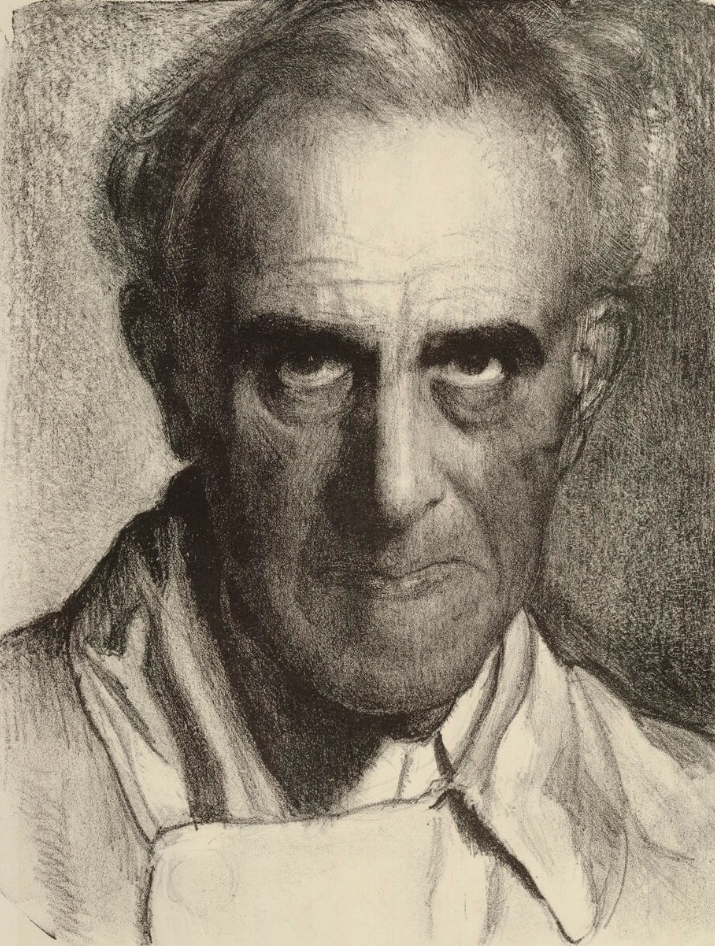
- Born: June 25, 1875; Manchester, England
- Died: July 17, 1950 (aged 75); England
- Education: Manchester School of Art; Royal Academy of Arts
- Known for: Lithography
- Spouse: Ethel Léontine Gabain
- Children: Peter; Christopher

Olympic medal record

Art competitions
Silver medal – second place	1948 London	Mixed Painting, Engravings And Etchings

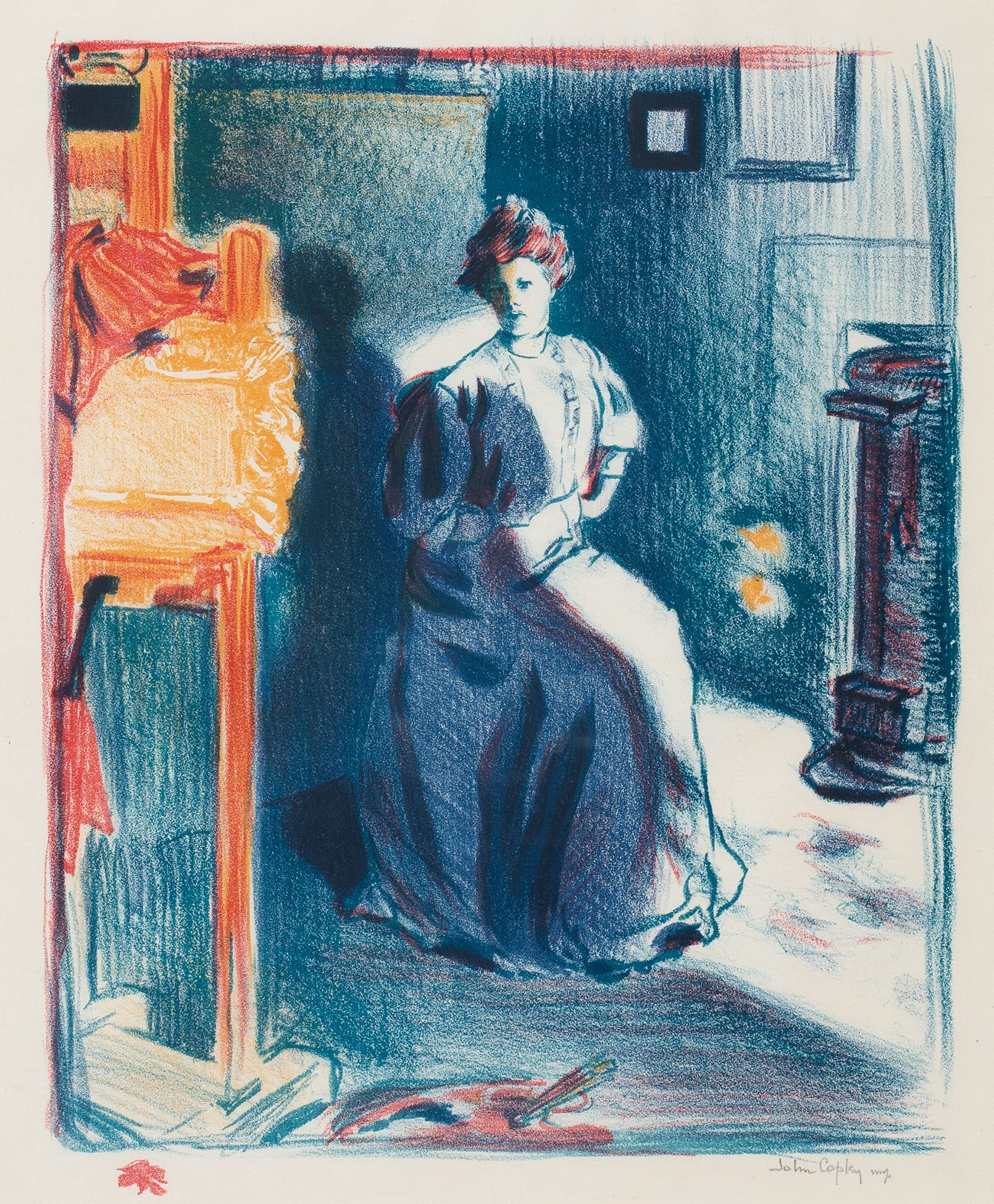
A-Daylight-Lamp (lithograph, 1909)

John Copley RBA (25 June 1875 – 17 July 1950) was a British artist. He was a founder member of the Senefelder Club and served as its honorary secretary from 1910 to 1916. While there he met his future wife, Ethel Léontine Gabain, with whom he had two sons.

Copley won a silver medal for Painting and Engraving at the 1948 London Summer Olympics. At 73, he was the oldest recipient of any Olympic medal. 1948 was the last Games in which art competitions were held.

== Personal life ==
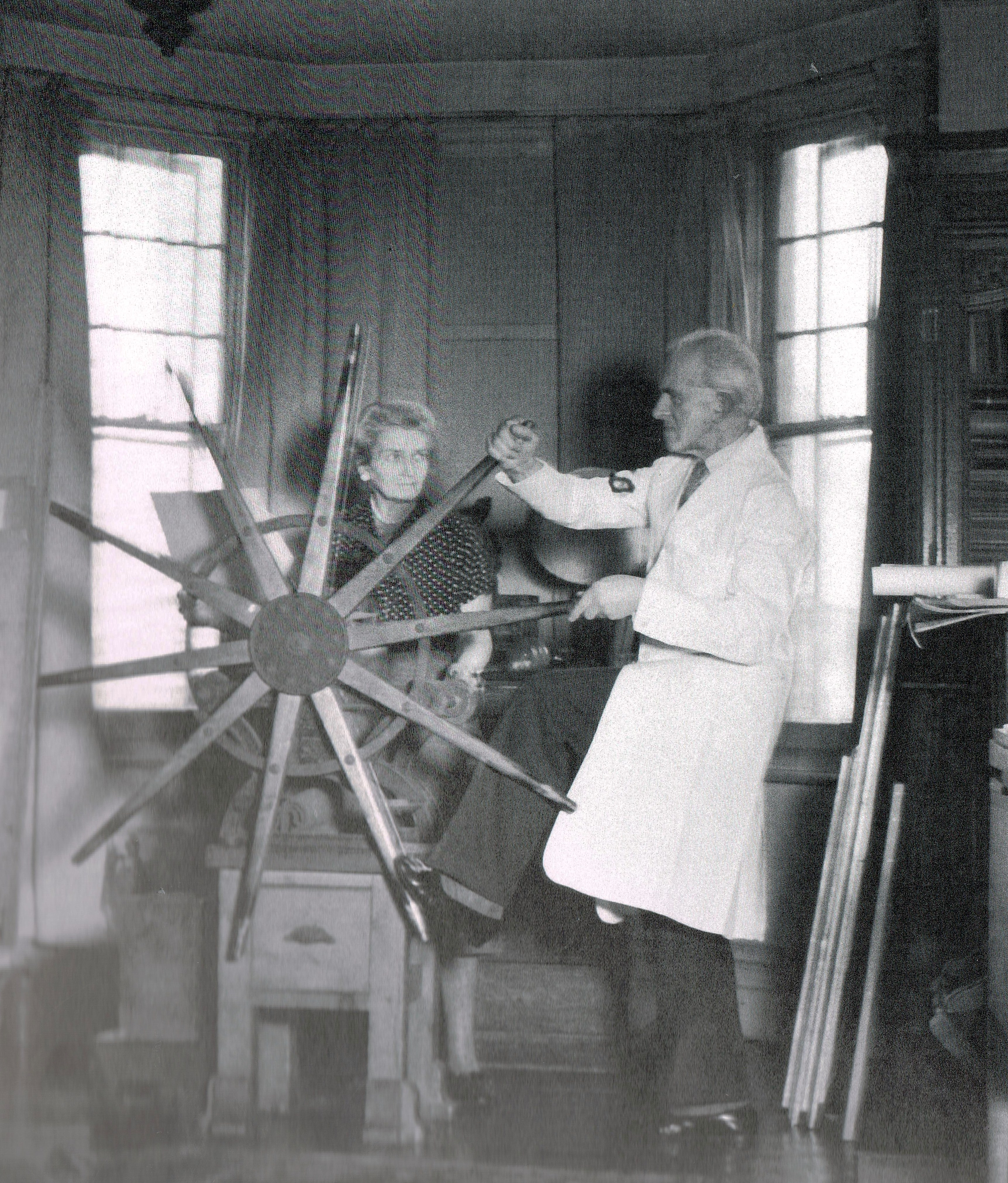
John Copley and wife Ethel, c.1930s

Copley was born Herbert Crawford Williamson in Manchester in 1875, the son of William Crawford Williamson, who was professor of botany at the University of Manchester, and his second wife, Annie Copley, née Heaton. He studied art at the Manchester School of Art and the Royal Academy. He spent ten years in Italy before moving to London. In 1909 Copley and Joseph Pennell started the Senefelder Club to publicise and promote lithography as an artistic medium. Copley was honorary secretary of the club until 1916. During this time he met the French-English artist Ethel Léontine Gabain and the couple married in June 1913.

John and Ethel lived in Kent for a time at The Yews in Longfield. They had two children, Peter and Christopher. Peter went on to have a successful and lengthy career as an actor. The family moved to 10 Hampstead Square, NW3, where they created a studio in which the couple could work together. They moved to Alassio, Italy, where they would stay for two and a half years before moving back to London.

During World War II he worked as an official war artist.

Ethel died on 30 January 1950 at the age of 66. Less than six months later, on 17 July 1950, John also died.

== Career ==
Copley was influenced by Ford Madox Brown. He became interested in lithography in 1906 and initially worked in colour before exclusively working in black and white. One of his works claimed a prize at Chicago Art Institute's First International Exhibition of Lithographs. In 1947 Copley was honoured as the president of the Royal Society of British Artists.

=== Olympic success ===
Copley submitted an engraving entitled "Polo Players" to the art competitions of the 1948 Summer Olympic Games in London. He won the silver medal in the Mixed Painting, Engravings And Etchings category, finishing second behind French artist Albert Decaris. At the time of the competition Copley was 73 years of age, making him the oldest ever Olympic medal winner. The arts competitions are no longer recognised by the International Olympic Committee; 72-year-old Swedish shooter Oscar Swahn is recorded as the oldest sporting medal winner.

The Fine Art Society celebrated Copley's Olympic success at the London Original Print Fair in April 2012. A collection of his works was on display throughout the event.
